= List of near threatened plants =

- Extinct in the wild (EW): 46 species
- Critically endangered (CR): 6,445 species
- Endangered (EN): 12,707 species
- Vulnerable (VU): 10,596 species
- Near threatened (NT, LR/cd): 4,880 species
- Least concern (LC): 35,732 species
- Data deficient (DD): 6,317 species
Plant species (IUCN, 2025.2)
- 76,864 extant species have been evaluated
- 70,547 of those are fully assessed (Note: excludes data deficient evaluations.)
- 40,612 are not threatened at present
- 29,935 are threatened (Note: Threatened comprises CR, EN and VU.)
- 187 to 892 are extinct or extinct in the wild:
  - 141 extinct (EX) species (Note: Chart omits extinct (EX) species)
  - 46 extinct in the wild (EW)
  - 648 possibly extinct [CR(PE)]
  - 57 possibly extinct in the wild [CR(PEW)]

Near Threatened (NT) species do not currently qualify for Critically Endangered (CR), Endangered (EN) or Vulnerable (VU), but are likely to qualify for a threatened category in the near future, or are already close to qualifying.

As of September 2016, the International Union for Conservation of Nature (IUCN) lists 1851 near threatened plant species. 8.5% of all evaluated plant species are listed as near threatened. The IUCN also lists 51 subspecies and 73 varieties as near threatened. No subpopulations of plants have been evaluated by the IUCN.

This is a complete list of near threatened plant species, subspecies and varieties evaluated by the IUCN.

== Bryophytes ==
There are two bryophyte species assessed as near threatened.

=== Mosses ===
- Archidium elatum

=== Liverworts ===
- Scapania sphaerifera

== Pteridophytes ==
There are 25 pteridophyte species assessed as near threatened.

=== Leptosporangiate ferns ===
- Asplenium cardiophyllum
- Asplenium ecuadorense
- Asplenium jahandiezii, Verdon spleenwort
- Culcita macrocarpa, Woolly tree fern
- Cyathea corallifera
- Diplazium angulosum
- Diplazium melanosorum
- Diplazium pulicosum
- Dryopteris cyclopeltidiformis
- Elaphoglossum corderoanum
- Elaphoglossum furcatum, Mossy fern
- Hymenophyllum cristatum
- Lindsaea malabarica
- Pecluma pastazensis
- Pilularia globulifera, Pillwort
- Polystichum kadyrovii, Kadyrov's shield fern
- Thelypteris fluminalis

=== Isoetopsida ===
- Isoetes acadiensis
- Isoetes prototypus, Prototype quillwort
- Isoetes setacea, Iberian quillwort
- Isoetes stellenbossiensis
- Isoetes transvaalensis

=== Lycopodiopsida ===
Clubmosses and firmosses

- Huperzia holstii
- Huperzia polydactyla
- Selaginella sericea

== Gymnosperms ==
There are 168 species, two subspecies, and 29 varieties of gymnosperm assessed as near threatened.

=== Cycads ===
Species

- Cycas apoa
- Cycas arenicola
- Cycas badensis
- Cycas balansae
- Cycas bougainvilleana
- Cycas brachycantha
- Cycas brunnea
- Cycas campestris
- Cycas chevalieri
- Cycas conferta
- Cycas couttsiana
- Cycas dolichophylla
- Cycas edentata
- Cycas ferruginea
- Cycas papuana
- Cycas petraea
- Cycas rumphii
- Cycas schumanniana
- Cycas scratchleyana
- Cycas sexseminifera
- Cycas simplicipinna
- Cycas tanqingii
- Cycas tropophylla, Ha Long cycad
- Cycas yorkiana
- Dioon edule
- Encephalartos afer, Eastern cape dwarf cycad
- Encephalartos bubalinus, Lake Natron cycad
- Encephalartos ferox, Zululand cycad
- Encephalartos friderici-guilielmi, White-haired cycad
- Encephalartos ituriensis, Ituri forest cycad
- Encephalartos lanatus, Olifants river cycad
- Encephalartos laurentianus, Kwango giant cycad
- Encephalartos lehmannii, Karoo cycad
- Encephalartos longifolius, Suurberg cycad
- Encephalartos mackenziei
- Encephalartos natalensis, Natal cycad
- Encephalartos septentrionalis, Nile cycad
- Encephalartos transvenosus, Modjadji's cycad
- Macrozamia fawcettii
- Macrozamia longispina
- Macrozamia moorei
- Macrozamia serpentina
- Macrozamia stenomera
- Zamia amazonum
- Zamia boliviana
- Zamia chigua
- Zamia fairchildiana
- Zamia integrifolia, Bay-rush
- Zamia lecointei
- Zamia loddigesii
- Zamia manicata
- Zamia muricata
- Zamia obliqua
- Zamia paucijuga
- Zamia poeppigiana
- Zamia polymorpha
- Zamia pseudomonticola
- Zamia pseudoparasitica
- Zamia roezlii
- Zamia sandovalii
- Zamia tuerckheimii
- Zamia ulei

Subspecies

- Cycas maconochiei subsp. maconochiei

=== Conifers ===
Species

- Abies bracteata, Santa Lucia fir
- Abies cilicica, Cilician fir
- Abies holophylla, Needle fir
- Abies homolepis, Nikko fir
- Abies kawakamii, Taiwan fir
- Abies spectabilis, Webb fir
- Abies vejarii, Vejar's fir
- Acmopyle pancheri
- Agathis atropurpurea, Blue kauri pine
- Agathis labillardierei, New Guinea kauri
- Agathis microstachya, Atherton kauri pine
- Agathis silbae
- Amentotaxus argotaenia, Catkin yew
- Araucaria hunsteinii, Klinki pine
- Araucaria laubenfelsii
- Araucaria subulata
- Austrocedrus chilensis, Chilean cedar
- Austrotaxus spicata, New Caledonia yew
- Callitris acuminata
- Callitris baileyi, Bailey's cypress-pine
- Callitris drummondii, Drummond's cypress-pine
- Callitris neocaledonica
- Callitris roei, Roe's cypress-pine
- Calocedrus macrolepis, Chinese incense-cedar
- Cephalotaxus latifolia, Broad-leaved plum yew
- Chamaecyparis lawsoniana, Port Orford cedar
- Chamaecyparis obtusa, Hinoki cypress
- Cryptomeria japonica, Japanese cedar
- Cupressus cashmeriana, Bhutan cypress
- Juniperus blancoi
- Juniperus pingii, Ping's juniper
- Juniperus taxifolia, Luchu juniper
- Juniperus turbinata
- Keteleeria fortunei
- Libocedrus austrocaledonica
- Libocedrus bidwillii, Cedar
- Libocedrus plumosa, New Zealand cedar
- Nothotsuga longibracteata, Bristlecone hemlock
- Picea alcoquiana, Alcock's spruce
- Picea linzhiensis
- Picea meyeri, Meyer's spruce
- Picea purpurea, Purple cone spruce
- Pinus balfouriana, Foxtail pine
- Pinus coulteri, Coulter pine
- Pinus dalatensis, Dalat pine
- Pinus durangensis, Durango pine
- Pinus fenzeliana
- Pinus gerardiana, Gerrard's pine
- Pinus henryi, Henry's pine
- Pinus jaliscana, Jalisco pine
- Pinus latteri, Tenasserim pine
- Pinus lumholtzii, Lumholtz's pine
- Pinus monticola, Western white pine
- Pinus morrisonicola, Taiwan white pine
- Pinus peuce, Balkan pine
- Pinus praetermissa, Pino chino
- Platycladus orientalis, Oriental arbor-vitae
- Pseudotsuga macrocarpa, Big-cone Douglas-fir
- Sciadopitys verticillata, Japanese umbrella pine
- Taxus brevifolia, Pacific yew
- Thuja standishii, Japanese arbor-vitae
- Tsuga canadensis, Eastern hemlock
- Tsuga caroliniana, Carolina hemlock
- Tsuga sieboldii, Southern Japanese hemlock
- Widdringtonia schwarzii, Willowmore cedar

Subspecies

- Abies cilicica subsp. cilicica

Varieties

- Abies delavayi var. nukiangensis, Nukiang fir
- Abies forrestii var. forrestii
- Abies forrestii var. smithii
- Abies guatemalensis var. jaliscana
- Abies homolepis var. homolepis
- Amentotaxus argotaenia var. argotaenia
- Cephalotaxus fortunei var. alpina
- Chamaecyparis obtusa var. obtusa
- Cupressus arizonica var. glabra, Smooth Arizona cypress
- Cupressus lusitanica var. benthamii, Bentham's cypress
- Juniperus ashei var. ovata
- Juniperus flaccida var. poblana
- Juniperus oxycedrus var. transtagana
- Juniperus pingii var. wilsonii
- Juniperus recurva var. coxii, Coffin juniper
- Larix gmelinii var. olgensis, Olga Bay larch
- Larix griffithii var. speciosa
- Larix potaninii var. himalaica
- Papuacedrus papuana var. arfakensis
- Picea alcoquiana var. alcoquiana
- Pinus ayacahuite var. veitchii
- Pinus brutia var. eldarica, Eldarian pine
- Pinus elliottii var. densa
- Pinus flexilis var. reflexa
- Pinus greggii var. greggii
- Pinus tabuliformis var. umbraculifera
- Pinus taiwanensis var. fragilissima

==== Podocarpaceae ====
- Afrocarpus dawei
- Dacrycarpus steupii
- Dacrydium gracile
- Dacrydium lycopodioides
- Dacrydium magnum
- Dacrydium spathoides
- Falcatifolium falciforme
- Falcatifolium gruezoi
- Falcatifolium sleumeri
- Halocarpus kirkii
- Nageia fleuryi
- Nageia nagi
- Pherosphaera hookeriana, Mount Mawson pine
- Podocarpus acuminatus
- Podocarpus affinis
- Podocarpus atjehensis
- Podocarpus brevifolius
- Podocarpus deflexus
- Podocarpus glomeratus
- Podocarpus gnidioides
- Podocarpus lambertii
- Podocarpus longifoliolatus
- Podocarpus macrophyllus var. maki
- Podocarpus madagascariensis
- Podocarpus madagascariensis var. madagascariensis
- Podocarpus micropedunculatus
- Podocarpus nubigenus
- Podocarpus orarius
- Podocarpus rumphii
- Podocarpus salomoniensis
- Podocarpus teysmannii
- Podocarpus trinitensis
- Prumnopitys exigua
- Prumnopitys harmsiana
- Saxegothaea conspicua, Prince Albert's yew

=== Gnetopsida ===
- Ephedra funerea, Death Valley mormon tea
- Gnetum africanum
- Gnetum buchholzianum
- Gnetum diminutum
- Gnetum luofuense
- Gnetum neglectum
- Gnetum oblongum, Oblong-seeded gnetum

== Dicotyledons ==
=== Apiales ===
There are 35 species, one subspecies, and two varieties in the order Apiales assessed as near threatened.

==== Apiaceae ====
Species

- Apium crassipes
- Carum foetidum
- Carum jahandiezii
- Chaerophyllum astrantiae, Astrantia-like cow parsley
- Chaerophyllum atlanticum
- Eryngium alpinum
- Eryngium atlanticum
- Eryngium maroccanum
- Heracleum ossethicum, Ossethian cow-parsnip
- Lefebvrea angustisecta
- Lereschia thomasii
- Oenanthe fluviatilis, river water-dropwort
- Peucedanum munbyi
- Seseli leptocladum, finely twiggy seseli
- Seseli leucospermum
- Steganotaenia commiphoroides

Subspecies

- Oenanthe pimpinelloides subsp. callosa

==== Araliaceae ====
Species

- Apiopetalum velutinum
- Cussonia ostinii
- Dendropanax laurifolius
- Dendropanax pendulus
- Fatsia polycarpa
- Gamblea malayana
- Hydrocotyle tambalomaensis
- Meryta lanceolata
- Oreopanax avicenniifolius
- Oreopanax grandifolius
- Plerandra elongata
- Plerandra emiliana
- Plerandra sp. "neocaledonica"
- Polyscias farinosa
- Polyscias montana
- Polyscias sandwicensis
- Pseudopanax ferox, Fierce lancewood
- Pseudopanax gilliesii
- Schefflera pueckleri

Varieties

- Dendropanax nutans var. nutans
- Dendropanax nutans var. obtusifolius

==== Other Apiales ====
- Melanophylla aucubifolia

=== Aquifoliales ===
==== Aquifoliaceae (hollies) ====
Species

- Ilex altiplana
- Ilex canariensis
- Ilex ciliolata
- Ilex davidsei
- Ilex gleasoniana
- Ilex grandiflora
- Ilex harrisii
- Ilex huachamacariana
- Ilex ignicola
- Ilex illustris
- Ilex jacobsii
- Ilex jauaensis
- Ilex magnifructa
- Ilex marahuacae
- Ilex marginata
- Ilex paraguariensis, Yerba mate
- Ilex patens
- Ilex paujiensis
- Ilex polita
- Ilex sclerophylla
- Ilex sessilifructa
- Ilex sipapoana
- Ilex spruceana
- Ilex steyermarkii
- Ilex subrotundifolia
- Ilex sulcata
- Ilex tahanensis
- Ilex tateana
- Ilex tiricae
- Ilex venezuelensis

Subspecies

- Ilex perado subsp. azorica
- Ilex perado subsp. perado

Varieties

- Ilex savannarum var. savannarum
- Ilex sideroxyloides var. occidentalis

==== Stemonuraceae ====
- Grisollea crassifolia
- Hartleya inopinata
- Medusanthera vitiensis

=== Asterales ===
Species

- Aequatorium repandiforme
- Aetheolaena cuencana
- Aetheolaena lingulata
- Aetheolaena mojandensis
- Ageratina rhypodes
- Aristeguietia cacalioides
- Aristeguietia discolor
- Artemisia oelandica
- Baccharis arbutifolia
- Baccharis huairacajensis
- Baccharis klattii
- Bafutia tenuicaulis
- Bellis prostrata
- Brachyglottis perdicioides
- Brachylaena huillensis
- Centaurea citricolor
- Centaurea lactiflora
- Centaurea pinnata
- Cirsium balkharicum, Balkarian thistle
- Cirsium chrysacanthum
- Clibadium mexiae
- Cousinia fedorovii, Fedorov's cousinia
- Crassocephalum bougheyanum
- Critoniopsis sodiroi
- Critoniopsis tungurahuae
- Cronquistianthus loxensis
- Darwiniothamnus lancifolius, lance-leafed Darwin's shrub
- Darwiniothamnus tenuifolius, thin-leafed Darwin's shrub
- Dendrophorbium onae
- Dendrophorbium tipocochense
- Diplostephium espinosae
- Diplostephium macrocephalum
- Diplostephium oblanceolatum
- Elaphandra pastazensis
- Ericentrodea homogama
- Euryops mucosus
- Gnaphalium dysodes
- Gynoxys cuicochensis
- Gynura travancorica
- Helianthus exilis
- Helichrysum cameroonense
- Helichrysum mannii
- Hieracium sodiroanum
- Ichthyothere pastazensis
- Jacobaea gigantea
- Jalcophila ecuadorensis
- Jungia fistulosa
- Jungia mitis
- Kingianthus paniculatus
- Klasea caucasica, Caucasian sawwort
- Lactuca alpestris
- Lactuca cyprica
- Lecocarpus darwinii, cut leaf daisy
- Leontodon boryi
- Leontodon siculus
- Llerasia assuensis
- Loricaria antisanensis
- Mikania harlingii
- Mikania iodotricha
- Monticalia teretifolia
- Moonia heterophylla
- Munnozia pinnatipartita
- Nouelia insignis
- Oldenburgia grandis
- Olearia chathamica
- Olearia fragrantissima, fragrant tree daisy
- Olearia traversii, Chatham Island akeake
- Oligactis pichinchensis, synonym of Sampera pichinchensis
- Ophryosporus densiflorus
- Pappobolus hypargyreus
- Pappobolus lehmannii
- Pentacalia campii
- Psephellus meskheticus, Meskhetian psephellus
- Psephellus salviifolius, sage-leaved psephellus
- Santolina oblongifolia
- Solidago houghtonii
- Sonchus mauritanicus
- Tanacetum tricholobum, hairy-lobed tansy
- Tanacetum zangezuricum, Zangezurian tansy
- Tragopogon sosnowskyi, Sosnowskiy's goat's beard
- Verbesina brachypoda
- Verbesina pentantha
- Verbesina petrobioides

Subspecies

- Artemisia campestris subsp. bottnica
- Darwiniothamnus lancifolius subsp. glandulosus

=== Austrobaileyales ===
==== Schisandraceae ====
- Illicium peninsulare, synonym of Illicium stapfii
- Illicium philippinense
- Illicium tenuifolium

=== Boraginales ===
==== Boraginaceae ====
Species

- Bourreria baccata
- Myosotis atlantica
- Myosotis lazica, Lazetian forget-me-not
- Tournefortia ramosissima
- Varronia lucayana

Varieties

- Tournefortia astrotricha var. subglabra

==== Cordiaceae ====
- Cordia decandra
- Cordia elliptica
- Cordia obovata
- Cordia revoluta, revolute-leafed cordia
- Cordia rickseckeri
- Cordia suckertii

=== Brassicales ===
- Arabis armena, Armenian rock-cress
- Brassica rupestris
- Brassica villosa
- Capparis discolor
- Carpoceras tatianae, Tatyana's carpoceras
- Crambe fruticosa
- Draba hookeri
- Draba mingrelica, Megrelian whitelow-grass
- Draba obovata
- Ionopsidium savianum
- Murbeckiella sousae
- Sinapidendron gymnocalyx
- Thlaspi jankae, Slovak penny-cress

=== Buxales ===
==== Buxaceae ====
- Buxus colchica

=== Campanulales ===
- Burmeistera refracta
- Campanula alata
- Campanula bohemica
- Centropogon dissectus
- Centropogon llanganatensis
- Centropogon sodiroanus
- Centropogon subandinus
- Clermontia grandiflora
- Clermontia persicifolia
- Dielsantha galeopsoides
- Solenopsis bicolor

=== Caryophyllales ===
==== Cactus species ====
- Ariocarpus kotschoubeyanus
- Austrocactus philippii
- Austrocylindropuntia cylindrica
- Austrocylindropuntia pachypus
- Aztekium hintonii
- Browningia chlorocarpa
- Cereus horrispinus
- Cereus mortensenii
- Cleistocactus acanthurus
- Cleistocactus neoroezlii
- Cleistocactus reae
- Copiapoa echinoides
- Copiapoa humilis
- Copiapoa marginata
- Corynopuntia marenae
- Discocactus heptacanthus
- Discocactus zehntneri
- Disocactus flagelliformis
- Disocactus martianus
- Echinocactus parryi, now Homalocephala parryi
- Echinocactus platyacanthus
- Echinocereus websterianus, Isla San Pedro cactus
- Echinopsis atacamensis
- Echinopsis ayopayana
- Echinopsis caineana
- Echinopsis vasquezii
- Epiphyllum grandilobum
- Eriosyce islayensis
- Espostoa frutescens
- Espostoa guentheri
- Ferocactus alamosanus
- Ferocactus histrix
- Ferocactus pottsii
- Frailea cataphracta
- Geohintonia mexicana
- Leptocereus sylvestris
- Maihueniopsis clavarioides
- Mammillaria blossfeldiana
- Mammillaria boolii
- Mammillaria hahniana
- Mammillaria napina
- Mammillaria plumosa
- Matucana pujupatii
- Melocactus broadwayi
- Melocactus caroli-linnaei
- Melocactus lemairei
- Micranthocereus flaviflorus
- Opuntia curassavica
- Opuntia triacantha, Big Pine Key prickly-pear
- Oreocereus pseudofossulatus
- Pachycereus lepidanthus
- Parodia aureicentra
- Parodia columnaris
- Pediocactus bradyi, Brady's pincushion cactus
- Pediocactus despainii, Despain's pincushion cactus
- Pilosocereus arrabidae
- Pilosocereus chrysostele
- Pilosocereus densiareolatus
- Pilosocereus flexibilispinus
- Pilosocereus fulvilanatus
- Pseudorhipsalis acuminata
- Pseudorhipsalis himantoclada
- Rebutia arenacea
- Rebutia vasqueziana
- Rhipsalis cereoides
- Rhipsalis clavata
- Rhipsalis olivifera
- Rhipsalis ormindoi
- Schlumbergera rosea (syn. Hatiora rosea)
- Sclerocactus wrightiae, Wrights fishhook cactus
- Siccobaccatus dolichospermaticus
- Stenocereus beneckei
- Thelocactus macdowellii
- Turbinicarpus lophophoroides
- Turbinicarpus schmiedickeanus

==== Caryophyllaceae ====
- Arenaria provincialis
- Dianthus nitidus, Carpathian glossy pink
- Petrocoptis montsicciana
- Silene biafrae
- Silene mariana
- Silene rothmaleri
- Silene velutina

==== Nepenthaceae ====
- Nepenthes albomarginata
- Nepenthes angasanensis
- Nepenthes deaniana
- Nepenthes densiflora
- Nepenthes diatas
- Nepenthes hirsuta
- Nepenthes hispida
- Nepenthes sanguinea
- Nepenthes veitchii
- Nepenthes ventricosa

==== Other Caryophyllales species ====
- Achyranthes talbotii
- Calandrinia galapagosa, Galapagos rock-purslane
- Coccoloba dariensis
- Coccoloba plumieri
- Colignonia pentoptera
- Decarya madagascariensis
- Guapira rotundifolia
- Lithophila radicata
- Lithops optica
- Namibia cinerea
- Rumex ginii
- Ruprechtia apetala

=== Celastrales ===
==== Celastraceae ====
- Crossopetalum parviflorum
- Euonymus acanthocarpa
- Euonymus glandulosus
- Goniodiscus elaeospermus
- Maytenus addat
- Maytenus canariensis
- Maytenus clarendonensis
- Maytenus crassipes
- Maytenus dhofarensis
- Perrottetia multiflora
- Salacia dimidia
- Salacia letouzeyana
- Salacia mamba
- Salacia talbotii
- Zinowiewia costaricensis

==== Dichapetalaceae ====
- Dichapetalum witianum
- Tapura magnifolia

=== Cornales ===
- Davidia involucrata var. involucrata

=== Cucurbitales ===
- Anisophyllea griffithii
- Begonia acerifolia
- Begonia consobrina
- Begonia froebelii
- Begonia schaeferi
- Begonia sodiroi

=== Dilleniales ===
- Dillenia ferruginea
- Hibbertia altigena
- Hibbertia comptonii
- Hibbertia deplancheana
- Hibbertia ebracteata
- Hibbertia nana
- Hibbertia vieillardii

=== Dipsacales ===
- Succisa trichotocephala
- Valeriana asterothrix
- Viburnum costaricanum
- Viburnum elatum
- Viburnum stellato-tomentosum

=== Ericales ===
==== Actinidiaceae ====
- Saurauia adenodonta
- Saurauia laxiflora
- Saurauia lehmannii
- Saurauia magnifica
- Saurauia mahmudii
- Saurauia malayana
- Saurauia rubens
- Saurauia schultzeorum

==== Balsaminaceae ====
- Impatiens mirabilis
- Impatiens parishii

==== Clethraceae ====
- Clethra alexandri
- Clethra crispa
- Clethra hendersonii

==== Ebenaceae ====
- Diospyros britannoborneensis
- Diospyros johorensis
- Diospyros longiflora
- Diospyros macrocarpa
- Diospyros maingayi
- Diospyros minimifolia
- Diospyros nur
- Diospyros seychellarum
- Diospyros soyauxii
- Diospyros wajirensis

==== Ericaceae ====
Species

- Arbutus glandulosa
- Arbutus xalapensis
- Lyonia jamaicensis
- Lyonia octandra
- Rhododendron fictolacteum
- Rhododendron rex

Subspecies

- Erica scoparia subsp. platycodon

==== Lecythidaceae ====
- Barringtonia pterita
- Cariniana pyriformis, Colombian mahogany
- Couroupita nicaraguarensis
- Eschweilera atropetiolata
- Eschweilera cyathiformis
- Eschweilera obversa
- Eschweilera punctata
- Lecythis lanceolata
- Lecythis lurida
- Lecythis retusa
- Lecythis serrata
- Pierrina zenkeri
- Planchonia grandis
- Rhaptopetalum geophylax

==== Myrsinaceae ====
Species

- Aegiceras floridum
- Ardisia maxonii
- Ardisia nigrovirens
- Ardisia opaca
- Embelia mildbraedii
- Geissanthus pichinchae
- Geissanthus vanderwerffii
- Myrsine fernseei
- Parathesis seibertii
- Rapanea perakensis
- Wallenia calyptrata
- Wallenia clusioides
- Wallenia corymbosa
- Wallenia grisebachii
- Wallenia purdieana

Varieties

- Myrsine grantii var. tobiiensis
- Myrsine ovalis var. ovalis

==== Primulaceae ====
- Anagallis crassifolia
- Anagallis elegantula
- Anagallis kochii
- Lysimachia cousiniana
- Myrsine fusca
- Primula scandinavica

==== Sapotaceae ====
Species

- Aningeria altissima
- Breviea sericea
- Burckella sorei
- Chrysophyllum arenarium
- Chrysophyllum bombycinum
- Chrysophyllum brenesii
- Chrysophyllum flexuosum
- Chrysophyllum hirsutum
- Chrysophyllum inornatum
- Chrysophyllum januariense
- Chrysophyllum ovale
- Chrysophyllum parvulum
- Chrysophyllum viride
- Elaeoluma crispa
- Madhuca barbata
- Madhuca borneensis
- Madhuca crassipes
- Madhuca dubardii
- Madhuca kingiana
- Madhuca korthalsii
- Madhuca motleyana
- Madhuca pallida
- Madhuca penangiana
- Madhuca prolixa
- Madhuca pubicalyx
- Madhuca tomentosa
- Madhuca tubulosa
- Manilkara paraensis
- Manilkara rufula
- Manilkara subsericea
- Manilkara valenzuelana
- Micropholis casiquiarensis
- Micropholis crassipedicellata
- Micropholis cylindrocarpa
- Micropholis garciniifolia
- Micropholis gnaphaloclados
- Micropholis humboldtiana
- Micropholis madeirensis
- Micropholis maguirei
- Micropholis rugosa
- Micropholis splendens
- Micropholis suborbicularis
- Micropholis williamii
- Mimusops angel
- Mimusops sechellarum
- Palaquium cryptocariifolium
- Palaquium gutta
- Palaquium herveyi
- Palaquium hexandrum
- Palaquium leiocarpum
- Palaquium microphyllum
- Palaquium petiolare
- Palaquium rioense
- Palaquium stellatum
- Palaquium tenuipetiolatum
- Palaquium walsurifolium
- Payena leerii
- Payena selangorica
- Planchonella malaccensis
- Pouteria anteridata
- Pouteria atabapoensis
- Pouteria beaurepairei
- Pouteria buenaventurensis
- Pouteria canaimaensis
- Pouteria cicatricata
- Pouteria gabrielensis
- Pouteria grandiflora
- Pouteria izabalensis
- Pouteria maguirei
- Pouteria pimichinensis
- Pouteria platyphylla
- Pouteria retinervis
- Pouteria rigidopsis
- Pouteria rodriguesiana
- Pouteria sclerocarpa
- Pouteria splendens
- Pouteria tarapotensis
- Pradosia atroviolacea
- Pradosia spinosa
- Sideroxylon cartilagineum
- Sideroxylon contrerasii
- Sideroxylon montanum
- Sideroxylon octosepalum
- Sideroxylon rotundifolium

Subspecies

- Chrysophyllum lucentifolium subsp. lucentifolium
- Pouteria rigida subsp. rigida
- Pouteria rigida subsp. tomentosa
- Sideroxylon capiri subsp. capiri
- Sideroxylon persimile subsp. subsessiliflorum

Varieties

- Isonandra perakensis var. perakensis

==== Sarraceniaceae ====
Species

- Sarracenia alata, yellow trumpets

Subspecies

- Sarracenia rubra subsp. rubra

Varieties

- Sarracenia purpurea var. burkii

==== Styracaceae ====
- Rehderodendron macrocarpum

==== Symplocaceae ====
- Symplocos longipes
- Symplocos octopetala
- Symplocos pyriflora

==== Theaceae ====
- Adinandra angulata
- Adinandra forbesii
- Adinandra integerrima
- Adinandra parvifolia
- Balthasaria schliebenii
- Camellia costata
- Camellia hengchunensis
- Camellia indochinensis
- Camellia longissima
- Camellia melliana
- Camellia parvimuricata
- Camellia pilosperma
- Camellia subintegra
- Camellia tuberculata
- Freziera friedrichsthailana
- Freziera longipes
- Freziera tomentosa
- Pyrenaria pahangensis
- Ternstroemia evenia
- Ternstroemia maclellandiana
- Visnea mocanera

==== Theophrastaceae ====
- Clavija longifolia

=== Fabales ===
Species

- Abarema longipedunculata
- Abarema villifera
- Acacia ataxiphylla, large-fruited tammin wattle
- Acacia aulacocarpa
- Acacia ausfeldii, Ausfeld's wattle
- Acacia caraniana
- Acacia cernua
- Acacia condyloclada
- Acacia dolichostachya
- Acacia gaumeri
- Acacia jacksonioides
- Acacia loderi, Nealie
- Acacia moggii
- Acacia montis-usti, Senegalia montis-usti
- Acacia negrii
- Acacia ochracea
- Acacia origena
- Acacia pennivenia
- Acacia robynsiana, whip stick acacia
- Acacia sarcophylla
- Acacia somalensis
- Adesmia sanjuanensis
- Aeschynomene venulosa
- Albizia lathamii
- Albizia thompsonii
- Anthonotha stipulacea
- Arachis helodes
- Archidendron pahangense
- Archidendron vaillantii, salmon bean
- Aspalathus pendula, golden tea
- Aspalathus sanguinea
- Astragalus atricapillus
- Astragalus castetteri, Castetter's milkvetch
- Astragalus harrisonii, Harrison's milkvetch
- Astragalus inyoensis, Inyo locoweed
- Astragalus kubensis, Kubian milk vetch
- Astragalus ruscifolius
- Baikiaea plurijuga, Rhodesian-teak
- Baphia speciosa
- Bauhinia diphylla
- Bauhinia merrilliana
- Bossiaea lenticularis
- Brodriguesia santosii
- Cajanus cajanifolius
- Calliandra brenesii
- Calobota lotononoides
- Chamaecrista paraunana
- Chamaecrista pohliana
- Chamaecrista urophyllidia
- Chapmannia gracilis
- Chapmannia sericea
- Chorizema carinatum
- Coelidium villosum
- Cordyla madagascariensis
- Cordyla somalensis
- Coursetia dubia
- Crotalaria collina
- Crotalaria exaltata
- Cullen walkingtonii
- Cyclopia sessiliflora
- Dalbergia bracteolata
- Dalbergia chapelieri
- Dalbergia cultrata, Burma blackwood
- Dalbergia emirnensis
- Dalbergia eremicola
- Dalbergia greveana
- Dalbergia horrida
- Dalbergia melanoxylon, African blackwood
- Dalbergia mollis
- Dalbergia pervillei
- Dalea humifusa
- Daniellia klainei
- Daviesia mollis
- Delonix baccal, Poinciana
- Delonix leucantha
- Dialium bipindense
- Dialium cochinchinense, velvet tamarind
- Dialium lopense
- Dialium orientale
- Dichrostachys kirkii
- Didelotia idae
- Didelotia unifoliolata
- Dillwynia pungens
- Droogmansia scaettaiana
- Entada louvelii
- Entada nudiflora
- Erythrina megistophylla
- Erythrina sacleuxii
- Erythrina schimpffii
- Erythrophleum lasianthum
- Flemingia kradungensis
- Gilbertiodendron limba
- Harpalyce cubensis
- Hedysarum flexuosum
- Hoffmannseggia repens, creeping rush-pea
- Humboldtia decurrens
- Humularia anceps
- Hymenostegia aubrevillei
- Indigofera atricephala
- Indigofera bancroftii
- Indigofera tomentosa
- Inga hayesii
- Inga megalobotrys
- Inga porcata
- Inga sarayacuensis
- Intsia bijuga
- Intsia palembanica
- Jupunba glauca
- Koompassia excelsa
- Labichea digitata
- Lathyrus odoratus, sweet pea
- Leobordea tapetiformis
- Leucaena salvadorensis
- Lupinus abramsii, Abrams lupine
- Lupinus peirsonii, Peirson's lupine
- Lupinus rivularis, riverbank lupine
- Lupinus westianus, Gulf coast lupine
- Maniltoa vestita
- Medicago heyniana
- Medicago pironae
- Medicago strasseri
- Millettia hypolampra
- Millettia macrophylla
- Mimosa brevipetiolata
- Mimosa dryandroides
- Mimosa elliptica
- Mimosa insidiosa
- Mimosa orthacantha
- Mimosa petraea
- Mimosa verrucosa
- Monnina chimborazeana
- Monopetalanthus heitzii
- Notospartium carmichaeliae
- Notospartium glabrescens
- Notospartium torulosum, Carmichaelia torulosa
- Onobrychis meschetica, Meskhetian sainfoin
- Ononis maweana
- Ophrestia madagascariensis
- Ormocarpopsis aspera
- Ormocarpum schliebenii
- Ormosia gracilis
- Ormosia hosiei
- Ormosia stipulacea
- Parapiptadenia zehntneri
- Parkinsonia raimondoi
- Pearsonia bracteata
- Pellegriniodendron diphyllum
- Phyllota squarrosa, dense phyllota
- Plagiosiphon gabonensis
- Prosopis alba
- Prosopis tamarugo
- Psoralea repens
- Psoralea reverchonii, Reverchon's scurf-pea
- Pterocarpus angolensis, bleedwood tree
- Pterogyne nitens
- Pultenaea echinula, curved bush-pea
- Pultenaea villifera, yellow bush-pea
- Saraca celebica
- Senna ankaranensis
- Senna caudata
- Senna trolliiflora
- Serianthes petitiana
- Sophora gypsophila, Guadalupe mescal bean
- Sphaerolobium pulchellum, reed pea
- Tachigali densiflora
- Tachigali denudata
- Trifolium saxatile
- Vachellia allenii
- Vicia ocalensis, Ocala vetch
- Vigna khandalensis
- Wiborgiella sessilifolia
- Xanthophyllum monticolum
- Xanthophyllum pubescens
- Zenia insignis

Subspecies

- Craibia brevicaudata subsp. brevicaudata
- Delonix leucantha subsp. gracilis
- Leucaena leucocephala subsp. ixtahuacana
- Polygala tenuicaulis subsp. tayloriana

Varieties

- Abarema alexandri var. alexandri
- Abarema alexandri var. troyana
- Acacia pachyceras var. najdensis
- Chloroleucon mangense var. tetrazyx
- Dalbergia hupeana var. laccifera
- Hydrochorea marginata var. scheryi

=== Fagales ===
==== Betulaceae ====
Species

- Betula globispica
- Carpinus kweichowensis
- Carpinus mollicoma

==== Fagaceae ====
Species

- Castanea ozarkensis
- Castanopsis cerebrina
- Castanopsis chevalieri
- Castanopsis curtisii
- Castanopsis kawakamii
- Castanopsis microphylla
- Castanopsis nephelioides
- Castanopsis pedunculata
- Castanopsis philipensis
- Castanopsis rhamnifolia
- Castanopsis rockii
- Castanopsis schefferiana
- Castanopsis wattii
- Lithocarpus apoensis
- Lithocarpus beccarianus
- Lithocarpus castellarnauianus
- Lithocarpus cerifer
- Lithocarpus confragosus
- Lithocarpus crassinervius
- Lithocarpus cyclophorus
- Lithocarpus echinophorus
- Lithocarpus fordianus
- Lithocarpus hatusimae
- Lithocarpus indutus
- Lithocarpus kingianus
- Lithocarpus korthalsii
- Lithocarpus kunstleri
- Lithocarpus lampadarius
- Lithocarpus longipedicellatus
- Lithocarpus luzoniensis
- Lithocarpus macphailii
- Lithocarpus mindanaensis
- Lithocarpus naiadarum
- Lithocarpus neorobinsonii
- Lithocarpus nodosus
- Lithocarpus ovalis
- Lithocarpus paihengii
- Lithocarpus pallidus
- Lithocarpus papillifer
- Lithocarpus pseudomoluccus
- Lithocarpus rhabdostachyus
- Lithocarpus rigidus
- Lithocarpus submonticola
- Lithocarpus trachycarpus
- Lithocarpus tubulosus
- Lithocarpus vidalii
- Lithocarpus wallichianus
- Quercus ariifolia
- Quercus bella
- Quercus benthamii
- Quercus castaneifolia
- Quercus × cerrioides
- Quercus chenii
- Quercus cortesii
- Quercus crispifolia
- Quercus crispipilis
- Quercus durifolia
- Quercus elmeri
- Quercus hypargyrea
- Quercus hypophaea
- Quercus iltisii
- Quercus jenseniana
- Quercus lamellosa
- Quercus langbianensis
- Quercus lobata, valley oak
- Quercus lowii
- Quercus mcvaughii
- Quercus oblongata
- Quercus oidocarpa
- Quercus oleoides
- Quercus oxyphylla
- Quercus palmeri
- Quercus parvula, Santa Cruz Island oak
- Quercus peninsularis
- Quercus persica
- Quercus pinnativenulosa
- Quercus purulhana
- Quercus rysophylla
- Quercus sadleriana, Sadler's oak
- Quercus saltillensis
- Quercus sartorii
- Quercus skinneri
- Quercus subsericea
- Quercus sumatrana
- Quercus valdinervosa
- Quercus xylina
- Trigonobalanus verticillata

Subspecies

- Quercus ilex subsp. ballota
- Quercus petraea subsp. huguetiana

==== Juglandaceae ====
- Alfaroa guatemalensis
- Alfaroa manningii
- Juglans australis
- Juglans californica
- Juglans olanchana
- Oreomunnea pterocarpa

==== Myricaceae ====
- Canacomyrica monticola
- Myrica singularis

==== Nothofagaceae ====
- Nothofagus aequilateralis
- Nothofagus codonandra
- Nothofagus gunnii
- Nothofagus pseudoresinosa

=== Garryales ===
- Garrya grisea

=== Geraniales ===
- Erodium foetidum subsp. foetidum

=== Gentianales ===
==== Apocynaceae ====
- Aspidosperma megalocarpon
- Aspidosperma triternatum
- Epistemma rupestre
- Maclaudia felixii
- Matelea jaramilloi
- Pachypodium namaquanum, elephant's trunk
- Stephanostegia capuronii
- Tabernaemontana gamblei
- Tabernaemontana heyneana
- Tabernaemontana laurifolia, slingshot
- Tabernaemontana stenosiphon
- Tabernaemontana wullschlaegelii
- Tylophora cameroonica
- Wrightia demartiniana

==== Gentianaceae ====
- Exaculum pusillum
- Fagraea gracilipes
- Gentiana pannonica, Hungarian gentian
- Halenia minima
- Halenia taruga-gasso
- Sabatia kennedyana

==== Loganiaceae ====
- Geniostoma hirtellum
- Geniostoma macrophyllum
- Neuburgia alata
- Neuburgia macrocarpa

==== Rubiaceae ====
Species

- Alberta magna, Natal flame bush
- Alseis lugonis
- Anthospermum asperuloides
- Bikkia pachyphylla
- Casasia longipes
- Catesbaea foliosa
- Cinchona capuli
- Coussarea cephaëloides
- Coussarea dulcifolia
- Coussarea ecuadorensis
- Coussarea pilosiflora
- Coussarea spiciformis
- Erithalis harrisii
- Exostema brachycarpum
- Faramea angusta
- Galium litorale
- Gardenia gordonii
- Gardenia storckii
- Guettarda ochreata
- Ixora pudica
- Ixora raiateensis
- Ixora raivavaensis
- Joosia obtusa
- Ladenbergia pavonii
- Lasianthus oliganthus
- Macrocnemum jamaicense
- Manettia pichinchensis
- Mastixiodendron plectocarpum
- Morinda trimera
- Palicourea holmgrenii
- Palicourea stenosepala
- Palicourea subalatoides
- Pavetta curalicola
- Portlandia grandiflora
- Prismatomeris beccariana
- Prismatomeris robusta
- Psychotria atricaulis
- Psychotria chimboracensis
- Psychotria dolichantha
- Psychotria zombamontana
- Rondeletia glauca
- Rondeletia harrisii
- Rondeletia pilosa
- Stenostomum jamaicense
- Wendlandia arabica

Subspecies

- Chimarrhis cymosa subsp. jamaicensis

Varieties

- Psychotria pedunculata var. caudata

=== Icacinales ===
- Pyrenacantha chlorantha

=== Lamiales ===
==== Acanthaceae ====
- Aphelandra sulphurea
- Barleria usambarica
- Brachystephanus coeruleus
- Chlamydacanthus lindavianus
- Graptophyllum repandum
- Hygrophila asteracanthoides
- Hygrophila hippuroides
- Justicia anisophylla
- Justicia galapagana, Galapagos justicia
- Justicia ianthina
- Justicia niokolo-kobae
- Justicia regis
- Pseuderanthemum subauriculatum
- Spathacanthus hahnianus
- Staurogyne kamerunensis
- Staurogyne letestuana

==== Bignoniaceae ====
Species

- Handroanthus barbatus
- Handroanthus impetiginosus
- Handroanthus lapacho
- Handroanthus selachidentatus
- Handroanthus subtilis
- Handroanthus uleanus
- Roseodendron chryseum
- Spirotecoma rubriflora
- Tabebuia haemantha
- Tabebuia insignis
- Tabebuia orinocensis
- Tabebuia pilosa
- Tabebuia platyantha
- Tabebuia roseoalba
- Tabebuia schumanniana

==== Gesneriaceae ====
Species

- Besleria modica
- Besleria quadrangulata
- Cyrtandra feaniana
- Damrongia purpureolineata
- Gesneria calycina
- Gesneria calycosa
- Nautilocalyx ecuadoranus
- Nautilocalyx vinosus
- Pearcea hypocyrtiflora
- Pearcea rhodotricha
- Pearcea schimpfii
- Ramonda heldreichii, syn. Jankaea heldreichii
- Streptocarpus inflatus
- Streptocarpus ionanthus, syn. Saintpaulia ionantha
- Streptocarpus montanus

Varieties

- Rhytidophyllum grande var. grande

==== Lamiaceae ====
Species

- Aegiphila ferruginea
- Aeollanthus saxatilis
- Clinopodium mutabile
- Cornutia thyrsoidea
- Gmelina vitiensis
- Mentha cervina
- Mentha gattefossei
- Origanum dictamnus
- Oxera crassifolia
- Plectranthus triangularis
- Salvia andreji, Angrew's sage
- Salvia humboltiana, Salvia humboldtiana
- Sideritis scardica, Ironwort
- Stachys debilis
- Teucrium balthazaris
- Teucrium charidemi
- Thymus camphoratus
- Thymus capitellatus
- Thymus carnosus
- Thymus karamarianicus, Karamaryanian thyme
- Thymus lotocephalus

Subspecies

- Mentha suaveolens subsp. timija
- Teucrium eriocephalum subsp. almeriense

==== Oleaceae ====
Species

- Chionanthus caudifolius
- Chionanthus filiformis
- Chionanthus lancifolius
- Fraxinus sogdiana

Subspecies

- Olea europaea subsp. cerasiformis

==== Scrophulariaceae ====
- Anarrhinum longipedicellatum
- Calceolaria ferruginea
- Calceolaria helianthemoides
- Linaria fallax
- Linaria loeselii
- Linaria ricardoi
- Scrophularia tenuipes
- Veronica mannii

==== Verbenaceae ====
- Duranta armata
- Verbena demissa

==== Other Lamiales species ====
- Callitriche cribrosa
- Nuxia coriacea
- Nuxia glomerulata
- Utricularia bracteata
- Utricularia praeterita

=== Laurales ===
==== Atherospermataceae ====
- Laurelia sempervirens, Chilean laurel

==== Hernandiaceae ====
- Hernandia beninensis
- Hernandia jamaicensis

==== Lauraceae ====
Species

- Actinodaphne bourdillonii
- Actinodaphne kinabaluensis
- Actinodaphne kostermansii
- Actinodaphne sphaerocarpa
- Actinodaphne tadulingamii
- Actinodaphne tayabensis
- Actinodaphne venosa
- Aiouea angulata
- Aiouea brenesii
- Aiouea tomentosa
- Alseodaphne khasyana
- Alseodaphne longipes
- Beilschmiedia linharensis
- Beilschmiedia louisii
- Beilschmiedia opposita
- Beilschmiedia ovalis
- Beilschmiedia wightii
- Caryodaphnopsis burgeri
- Caryodaphnopsis theobromifolia
- Cinnamomum cordatum
- Cinnamomum corneri
- Cinnamomum fitianum
- Cinnamomum novae-britanniae
- Cinnamomum osmophloeum
- Cinnamomum reticulatum
- Cinnamomum trichophyllum
- Clinostemon mahuba
- Cryptocarya agathophylla
- Cryptocarya glauca
- Cryptocarya lauriflora
- Cryptocarya massoy
- Cryptocarya ovalifolia
- Cryptocarya pervillei
- Cryptocarya polyneura
- Cryptocarya rigidifolia
- Cryptocarya tuanku-bujangii
- Damburneya smithii
- Dehaasia longipedicellata
- Endiandra globosa
- Endiandra laxiflora
- Endiandra wrayi
- Endlicheria longicaudata
- Licaria pergamentacea
- Licaria sarapiquensis
- Lindera pipericarpa
- Litsea bourdillonii
- Litsea chinpingensis
- Litsea confusa
- Litsea coriacea
- Litsea doshia
- Litsea floribunda
- Litsea foxiana, synonym of Litsea maingayi
- Litsea glaberrima
- Litsea laevigata
- Litsea leytensis
- Litsea ligustrina
- Litsea nuculanea
- Litsea perrottetii
- Litsea philippinensis
- Litsea stocksii
- Litsea wightiana
- Machilus angustifolia
- Machilus wangchiana
- Mezilaurus subcordata
- Nectandra coeloclada
- Nectandra krugii
- Nectandra microcarpa
- Nectandra ramonensis
- Neolitsea daibuensis
- Neolitsea hiiranensis
- Nothaphoebe macrocarpa
- Nothaphoebe pahangensis
- Ocotea acarina
- Ocotea arcuata
- Ocotea arnottiana
- Ocotea atlantica
- Ocotea auriculiformis
- Ocotea clarkei, synonym of Ocotea laetevirens
- Ocotea confertiflora
- Ocotea corethroides
- Ocotea curucutuensis
- Ocotea haberi
- Ocotea humblotii
- Ocotea klotzschiana
- Ocotea lentii
- Ocotea martinicensis
- Ocotea mollicella
- Ocotea nervosa
- Ocotea racemosa
- Ocotea rivularis
- Ocotea rugosa
- Ocotea salvadorensis
- Ocotea sassafras
- Ocotea thouvenotii
- Ocotea tonduzii
- Persea humilis, synonym of Tamala humilis
- Persea obtusifolia
- Persea podadenia
- Persea rigida
- Phoebe bournei
- Phoebe megacalyx
- Phoebe scortechinii
- Pleurothyrium golfodulcense
- Potameia chartacea
- Potameia incisa
- Povedadaphne quadriporata, synonym of Ocotea quadriporata
- Rhodostemonodaphne negrensis
- Sassafras randaiense
- Sinosassafras flavinervium

Varieties

- Persea alpigena var. harrisii

==== Monimiaceae ====
- Macropeplus dentatus
- Mollinedia argyrogyna
- Mollinedia boracensis
- Mollinedia lamprophylla
- Mollinedia salicifolia
- Tambourissa madagascariensis
- Tambourissa nicolliae

==== Siparunaceae ====
- Siparuna multiflora
- Siparuna piloso-lepidota

=== Magnoliales ===
==== Annonaceae ====
Species

- Alphonsea curtisii
- Alphonsea hainanensis
- Alphonsea johorensis
- Anaxagorea gigantophylla
- Anaxagorea panamensis
- Annona boliviana
- Annona pickelii
- Annona schunkei
- Annona spraguei
- Annona trunciflora, synonym of Annona foetida
- Annona urbaniana
- Anonidium brieyi
- Asteranthe asterias
- Cremastosperma awaense
- Cremastosperma napoense
- Cremastosperma osicola
- Cremastosperma panamense
- Cremastosperma pendulum
- Cremastosperma venezuelanum
- Cyathocalyx scortechinii
- Cymbopetalum abacophyllum
- Dasymaschalon ellipticum
- Dendrokingstonia nervosa
- Desmopsis erythrocarpa
- Desmopsis heteropetala
- Desmopsis lanceolata
- Disepalum longipes
- Disepalum platypetalum
- Drepananthus carinatus
- Drepananthus ridleyi
- Duguetia chrysea
- Duguetia decurrens
- Duguetia rionegrensis
- Duguetia ulei
- Goniothalamus aruensis
- Goniothalamus megalocalyx
- Goniothalamus philippinensis
- Goniothalamus wynaadensis
- Guatteria microcarpa
- Guatteria notabilis
- Guatteria ruboides
- Hornschuchia citriodora
- Huberantha stuhlmannii
- Isolona ghesquierei
- Isolona madagascariensis
- Meiogyne pannosa
- Miliusa mollis
- Mitrephora keithii
- Mitrephora lanotan
- Mitrephora macclurei
- Mitrephora reflexa
- Mitrephora wangii
- Monanthotaxis orophila
- Monodora minor
- Monoon macranthum
- Mosannona xanthochlora
- Ophrypetalum odoratum
- Orophea alba
- Orophea cumingiana
- Orophea enneandra
- Orophea hexandra
- Orophea maculata
- Orophea uniflora
- Oxandra saxicola
- Phoenicanthus obliquus
- Piptostigma glabrescens
- Polyalthia borneensis
- Polyalthia insignis
- Polyalthia longirostris
- Polyalthia malabarica
- Polyalthia subcordata
- Polyceratocarpus microtrichus
- Porcelia magnifructa
- Sageraea thwaitesii
- Trigynaea triplinervis
- Unonopsis costanensis
- Unonopsis darienensis
- Unonopsis longipes
- Unonopsis monticola
- Unonopsis osae
- Unonopsis sessilicarpa
- Uvaria denhardtiana
- Uvaria gracilipes
- Uvaria kirkii
- Uvaria thomasii
- Xylopia bemarivensis
- Xylopia collina
- Xylopia congolensis
- Xylopia densifolia
- Xylopia hastarum
- Xylopia mucronata
- Xylopia ngii
- Xylopia nigricans
- Xylopia perrieri
- Xylopia pierrei

Subspecies

- Uvaria leptocladon subsp. leptocladon

==== Degeneriaceae ====
- Degeneria roseiflora

==== Magnoliaceae ====
Species

- Liriodendron chinense, Chinese tulip tree
- Magnolia borneensis
- Magnolia dealbata
- Magnolia elliptigemmata
- Magnolia figlarii
- Magnolia flaviflora
- Magnolia fujianensis
- Magnolia guangxiensis
- Magnolia obovalifolia
- Magnolia poasana
- Magnolia sororum

Varieties

- Magnolia macrophylla var. ashei, Ashe's magnolia

==== Myristicaceae ====
Species

- Cephalosphaera usambarensis
- Coelocaryon sphaerocarpum
- Gymnacranthera maliliensis
- Gymnacranthera ocellata
- Haematodendron glabrum
- Horsfieldia ardisiifolia
- Horsfieldia carnosa
- Horsfieldia coriacea
- Horsfieldia crassifolia
- Horsfieldia lancifolia
- Horsfieldia macrothyrsa
- Horsfieldia montana
- Horsfieldia oligocarpa
- Horsfieldia palauensis
- Horsfieldia reticulata
- Horsfieldia sparsa
- Horsfieldia splendida
- Horsfieldia sucosa
- Horsfieldia superba
- Iryanthera megistocarpa
- Knema losirensis
- Knema oblongata
- Knema oblongifolia
- Knema pedicellata
- Knema riangensis
- Knema stellata
- Knema stenocarpa
- Knema stylosa
- Myristica agusanensis
- Myristica crassa
- Myristica depressa
- Myristica garciniifolia
- Myristica gigantea
- Myristica guadalcanalensis
- Myristica hooglandii
- Myristica longipes
- Myristica lowiana
- Myristica maingayi
- Myristica markgraviana
- Myristica papyracea
- Myristica verruculosa
- Myristica xylocarpa
- Virola chrysocarpa
- Virola multicostata

Subspecies

- Horsfieldia subalpina subsp. kinabaluensis
- Knema kunstleri subsp. alpina
- Knema pectinata subsp. pectinata
- Knema rigidifolia subsp. rigidifolia
- Myristica bifurcata subsp. bifurcata
- Myristica bifurcata subsp. sulaica
- Myristica kajewski subsp. kajewski

Varieties

- Horsfieldia moluccana var. moluccana

=== Malpighiales ===
==== Calophyllaceae ====
Species

- Calophyllum amblyphyllum
- Calophyllum bicolor
- Calophyllum dasypodium
- Calophyllum flavoramulum
- Calophyllum laticostatum
- Calophyllum milvum
- Calophyllum pentapetalum
- Calophyllum polyanthum
- Caraipa minor
- Haploclathra cordata
- Kayea elegans
- Kayea kunstleri
- Kayea paniculata
- Kayea rosea
- Kielmeyera paniculata
- Mammea bongo
- Mammea novoguineensis
- Mammea woodii
- Neotatea neblinae

==== Chrysobalanaceae ====
Species

- Angelesia splendens
- Atuna elliptica
- Dactyladenia floribunda
- Grangeria borbonica
- Hirtella insignis
- Hirtella leonotis
- Hirtella pimichina
- Hunga gerontogea
- Hunga minutiflora
- Hymenopus operculipetalus
- Licania lanceolata
- Licania sandwithii
- Licania velutina
- Magnistipula cupheiflora
- Maranthes goetzeniana
- Moquilea grandibracteata
- Moquilea kallunkiae
- Parinari parvifolia
- Parinari sumatrana

Subspecies

- Hirtella zanzibarica subsp. megacarpa

==== Clusiaceae ====
Species

- Allanblackia marienii
- Chrysochlamys micrantha
- Chrysochlamys skutchii
- Clusia bracteosa
- Clusia elongata
- Clusia latipes
- Clusia lusoria
- Clusia pachamamae
- Clusia phelpsiae
- Clusia picardae
- Clusia platystigma
- Clusia tetra-trianthera
- Garcinia cuspidata
- Garcinia diversifolia
- Garcinia dives
- Garcinia dryobalanoides
- Garcinia eugeniaefolia, synonym of Garcinia brevirostris
- Garcinia hermonii
- Garcinia mckeaniana
- Garcinia memecyloides
- Garcinia mottleyana
- Garcinia myristicifolia
- Garcinia nitida
- Garcinia pervillei
- Garcinia rubra
- Garcinia vidua
- Moronobea intermedia
- Symphonia fasciculata
- Tovomita plumieri

Varieties

- Clusia havetioides var. havetioides
- Clusia havetioides var. stenocarpa

==== Euphorbiaceae ====
Species

- Acalypha cupricola
- Acalypha dictyoneura
- Alchornea leptogyna
- Austrobuxus montis-do
- Baloghia brongniartii
- Baloghia drimiflora
- Claoxylon ooumuense
- Claoxylon taitense
- Conceveiba macrostachys
- Croton laurinus
- Croton megalocarpoides
- Croton menthodorus
- Croton pycnanthus
- Croton talaeporos
- Croton wagneri
- Crotonogyne manniana
- Deutzianthus tonkinensis
- Drypetes cockburnii
- Drypetes laciniata
- Erythrococca molleri
- Euphorbia arbuscula
- Euphorbia nigrispinioides
- Euphorbia olowaluana
- Euphorbia pedilanthoides
- Euphorbia sekukuniensis
- Euphorbia smithii
- Euphorbia zoutpansbergensis
- Gymnanthes integra
- Karima scarciesii
- Koilodepas wallichianum
- Lasiocroton macrophyllus
- Macaranga quadricornis
- Macaranga taitensis
- Neoboutonia mannii
- Omalanthus stokesii
- Sapium harrisii
- Trigonostemon rufescens

Varieties

- Euphorbia celastroides var. celastroides
- Euphorbia celastroides var. hanapepensis

==== Phyllanthaceae ====
Species

- Antidesma cruciforme
- Aporosa isabellina, synonym of Aporosa maingayi
- Cleistanthus flavescens
- Cleistanthus kingii
- Cleistanthus lanuginosus
- Cleistanthus membranaceus
- Glochidion auii
- Glochidion collinum
- Glochidion merrillii
- Glochidion myrtifolium
- Glochidion novae-georgiae
- Glochidion praeclarum
- Glochidion raivavense
- Glochidion rapaense
- Glochidion robinsonii
- Glochidion societatis
- Glochidion subfalcatum
- Glochidion temehaniense
- Glochidion tooviianum
- Glochidion tuamotuense
- Glochidion wilderi
- Phyllanthus arbuscula
- Phyllanthus cladanthus
- Phyllanthus aluminescens
- Phyllanthus aoupinieensis
- Phyllanthus bancilhonae
- Phyllanthus buxoides
- Phyllanthus caudatus
- Phyllanthus dunnianus
- Phyllanthus humbertianus
- Phyllanthus koghiensis
- Phyllanthus latifolius
- Phyllanthus loranthoides
- Phyllanthus memaoyaensis
- Phyllanthus montanus
- Phyllanthus montis-fontium
- Phyllanthus moratii
- Phyllanthus pancherianus
- Phyllanthus pseudotrichopodus
- Phyllanthus purpusii
- Phyllanthus sarasinii
- Phyllanthus skutchii
- Phyllanthus somalensis
- Phyllanthus tireliae
- Phyllanthus watsonii

==== Rhizophoraceae ====
- Carallia diplopetala
- Carallia euryoides
- Cassipourea lanceolata
- Ceriops decandra
- Rhizophora samoensis

==== Other Malpighiales ====
- Bonnetia fasciculata
- Brackenridgea palustris
- Caraipa jaramilloi
- Elatine alsinastrum
- Elatine brochonii
- Elatine ojibwayensis
- Hypericum afrum
- Irvingia gabonensis
- Mesua rosea
- Populus pruinosa
- Ouratea jamaicensis
- Quiina jamaicensis
- Salix libanii
- Spachea correae

=== Malvales ===
==== Dipterocarpaceae ====
- Anisoptera megistocarpa
- Dipterocarpus borneensis
- Dipterocarpus caudiferus
- Dipterocarpus confertus
- Dipterocarpus costulatus
- Dipterocarpus eurhynchus
- Dipterocarpus humeratus
- Dipterocarpus lowii
- Dipterocarpus obtusifolius
- Dipterocarpus tuberculatus
- Dipterocarpus verrucosus
- Dipterocarpus zeylanicus
- Hopea bullatifolia
- Hopea dyeri
- Hopea fluvialis
- Hopea forbesii
- Hopea glabrifolia
- Hopea iriana
- Hopea montana
- Hopea nutans
- Hopea sphaerocarpa
- Hopea sulcata
- Hopea tenuinervula, assessed as Hopea tenuivervula
- Hopea treubii
- Hopea ultima
- Hopea wyattsmithii
- Monotes redheadii
- Parashorea densiflora
- Parashorea lucida
- Parashorea macrophylla
- Shorea agami, synonym of Anthoshorea agamae
- Shorea almon, synonym of Rubroshorea almon
- Shorea amplexicaulis, synonym of Rubroshorea amplexicaulis
- Shorea angustifolia, synonym of Richetia angustifolia
- Shorea asahi
- Shorea carapae, synonym of Rubroshorea carapae
- Shorea ciliata
- Shorea coriacea, synonym of Rubroshorea coriacea
- Shorea dasyphylla, synonym of Rubroshorea dasyphylla
- Shorea exelliptica
- Shorea faguetioides, synonym of Richetia faguetioides
- Shorea kudatensis, synonym of Richetia kudatensis
- Shorea lepidota, synonym of Rubroshorea lepidota
- Shorea leprosula, synonym of Rubroshorea leprosula
- Shorea lunduensis
- Shorea maxima, synonym of Richetia maxima
- Shorea maxwelliana
- Shorea myrionerva, synonym of Rubroshorea myrionerva
- Shorea obtusa
- Shorea palembanica, synonym of Rubroshorea palembanica
- Shorea patoiensis, synonym of Richetia patoiensis
- Shorea pauciflora, synonym of Rubroshorea pauciflora
- Shorea pilosa, synonym of Rubroshorea pilosa
- Shorea platyclados, synonym of Rubroshorea platyclados
- Shorea robusta
- Shorea rubra, synonym of Rubroshorea rubra
- Shorea sagittata, synonym of Rubroshorea sagittata
- Shorea scaberrima, synonym of Rubroshorea scaberrima
- Shorea scabrida, synonym of Rubroshorea scabrida
- Shorea scrobiculata
- Shorea stenoptera, synonym of Rubroshorea stenoptera
- Shorea submontana
- Shorea waltonii, synonym of Rubroshorea waltoni
- Shorea xanthophylla, synonym of Richetia xanthophylla
- Vateria copallifera
- Vatica borneensis
- Vatica brevipes
- Vatica brunigii
- Vatica coriacea
- Vatica cuspidata
- Vatica dulitensis
- Vatica heteroptera
- Vatica nitens
- Vatica vinosa

==== Malvaceae ====
- Acropogon bullatus
- Brownlowia tersa
- Burretiodendron tonkinense
- Cavanillesia platanifolia
- Cola lizae
- Cola semecarpophylla
- Colona poilanei
- Cullenia rosayroana
- Dombeya aethiopica
- Durio oxleyanus
- Hibiscus escobariae
- Hildegardia populifolia
- Pentace excelsa
- Pentace grandiflora
- Pentace strychnoidea
- Pentaplaris huaoranica
- Schoutenia furfuracea
- Sterculia cinerea
- Symphyochlamys erlangeri

Subspecies

- Hibiscus waimeae subsp. waimeae, white Kauai hibiscus

Varieties

- Plagianthus regius var. chathamicus
- Sterculia africana var. socotrana

==== Thymelaeaceae ====
- Daphnopsis equatorialsis
- Daphnopsis macrophylla
- Gonystylus brunnescens
- Gonystylus forbesii
- Gonystylus velutinus
- Lagetta lagetto
- Peddiea kivuensis
- Thymelaea broteriana

==== Other Malvales ====
- Elaeocarpus cordifolius
- Elaeocarpus cruciatus
- Elaeocarpus glabrescens
- Elaeocarpus munroi
- Elaeocarpus nanus
- Elaeocarpus pseudopaniculatus
- Elaeocarpus reticosus
- Elaeocarpus sallehiana
- Elaeocarpus symingtonii
- Leptolaena abrahamii
- Leptolaena arenaria
- Sarcolaena codonochlamys
- Sarcolaena eriophora
- Vallea ecuadorensis

Subspecies

- Elaeocarpus submonoceras subsp. collinus

Varieties

- Pavonia spicata var. troyana

=== Myrtales ===
There are 80 species and two varieties in the order Myrtales assessed as near threatened.

==== Combretaceae ====
Species

- Buchenavia kleinii
- Combretum mkuzense
- Combretum petrophilum
- Conocarpus lancifolius
- Pteleopsis tetraptera
- Terminalia latifolia

Varieties

- Terminalia glabrata var. brownii

==== Lythraceae ====
- Lythrum baeticum
- Lythrum flexuosum
- Rotala gerardii
- Sonneratia ovata

==== Melastomataceae ====
Species

- Astronidium macranthum
- Astronidium storckii
- Astronidium tomentosum
- Axinaea nitida
- Axinaea quitensis
- Blakea glandulosa
- Brachyotum campii
- Calvoa calliantha
- Clidemia caudata
- Clidemia longipedunculata
- Dissotis bambutorum
- Dissotis longisetosa
- Graffenrieda bella
- Henriettella odorata
- Memecylon corticosum
- Meriania crassiramis
- Meriania denticulata
- Meriania leucantha
- Miconia abbreviata
- Miconia bailloniana
- Miconia brevitheca
- Miconia capitellata
- Miconia cercophora
- Miconia conformis
- Miconia dielsii
- Miconia lugonis
- Miconia reburrosa
- Miconia scutata
- Miconia silicicola
- Miconia superba
- Mouriri laxiflora
- Pachyanthus pedicellatus

Varieties

- Memecylon acuminatum var. acuminatum

==== Myrtaceae ====
- Angophora floribunda
- Angophora hispida
- Angophora inopina
- Calycorectes maximus
- Campomanesia reitziana
- Campomanesia simulans
- Chamguava gentlei
- Cloezia buxifolia
- Corymbia calophylla
- Corymbia clandestina
- Corymbia ficifolia
- Corymbia gummifera
- Corymbia leptoloma
- Corymbia paractia
- Corymbia rhodops
- Corymbia tessellaris
- Corymbia xanthope
- Decaspermum nitentifolium
- Decaspermum nivale
- Eucalyptopsis papuana
- Eucalyptus adesmophloia
- Eucalyptus albopurpurea
- Eucalyptus amygdalina
- Eucalyptus aquilina
- Eucalyptus argutifolia
- Eucalyptus bancroftii
- Eucalyptus banksii
- Eucalyptus boliviana
- Eucalyptus bosistoana
- Eucalyptus botryoides
- Eucalyptus brachycalyx
- Eucalyptus brockwayi
- Eucalyptus brookeriana
- Eucalyptus broviniensis
- Eucalyptus calcareana
- Eucalyptus camaldulensis
- Eucalyptus campaspe
- Eucalyptus camphora
- Eucalyptus capillosa
- Eucalyptus capitellata
- Eucalyptus celastroides
- Eucalyptus chloroclada
- Eucalyptus cinerea
- Eucalyptus comitae-vallis
- Eucalyptus conferruminata
- Eucalyptus conglobata
- Eucalyptus coolabah
- Eucalyptus cordata
- Eucalyptus cornuta
- Eucalyptus cunninghamii
- Eucalyptus curtisii
- Eucalyptus decipiens
- Eucalyptus decurva
- Eucalyptus densa
- Eucalyptus discreta
- Eucalyptus dolichocera
- Eucalyptus dunnii
- Eucalyptus ecostata
- Eucalyptus eudesmioides
- Eucalyptus globoidea
- Eucalyptus grandis
- Eucalyptus hallii
- Eucalyptus helidonica
- Eucalyptus horistes
- Eucalyptus incrassata
- Eucalyptus insularis
- Eucalyptus jacksonii
- Eucalyptus jimberlanica
- Eucalyptus johnstonii
- Eucalyptus jucunda
- Eucalyptus kumarlensis
- Eucalyptus lacrimans
- Eucalyptus laevopinea
- Eucalyptus leptocalyx
- Eucalyptus ligulata
- Eucalyptus litorea
- Eucalyptus luculenta
- Eucalyptus major
- Eucalyptus marginata
- Eucalyptus melanoleuca
- Eucalyptus micranthera
- Eucalyptus microcorys
- Eucalyptus mooreana
- Eucalyptus obesa
- Eucalyptus obliqua
- Eucalyptus oleosa
- Eucalyptus olivina
- Eucalyptus orgadophila
- Eucalyptus paniculata
- Eucalyptus parramattensis
- Eucalyptus patens
- Eucalyptus pauciflora
- Eucalyptus perangusta
- Eucalyptus percostata
- Eucalyptus pilularis
- Eucalyptus polyanthemos
- Eucalyptus preissiana
- Eucalyptus pulchella
- Eucalyptus quadrans
- Eucalyptus radiata
- Eucalyptus raveretiana
- Eucalyptus remota
- Eucalyptus retusa
- Eucalyptus robusta
- Eucalyptus rubida
- Eucalyptus rudis
- Eucalyptus rugosa
- Eucalyptus salicola
- Eucalyptus salubris
- Eucalyptus scias
- Eucalyptus scopulorum
- Eucalyptus seeana
- Eucalyptus siderophloia
- Eucalyptus socialis
- Eucalyptus staeri
- Eucalyptus stellulata
- Eucalyptus sturgissiana
- Eucalyptus talyuberlup
- Eucalyptus taurina
- Eucalyptus tenera
- Eucalyptus tenuiramis
- Eucalyptus tetraptera
- Eucalyptus thozetiana
- Eucalyptus todtiana
- Eucalyptus urna
- Eucalyptus viminalis
- Eucalyptus virens
- Eucalyptus wetarensis
- Eucalyptus wyolensis
- Eugenia aherniana
- Eugenia amblyosepala
- Eugenia amplifolia
- Eugenia azeda
- Eugenia cayoana
- Eugenia choapamensis
- Eugenia coibensis
- Eugenia coronata
- Eugenia ericoides
- Eugenia erythrophylla
- Eugenia excoriata
- Eugenia flavoviridis
- Eugenia glandulosopunctata
- Eugenia gomezii
- Eugenia isosticta
- Eugenia marchiana
- Eugenia michoacanensis
- Eugenia monteverdensis
- Eugenia nitidula, synonym of Syzygium nitidulum
- Eugenia orites, synonym of Syzygium orites
- Eugenia pahangensis, synonym of Syzygium pahangense
- Eugenia pauciflora
- Eugenia pearsoniana, synonym of Syzygium prainianum subsp. prainianum
- Eugenia percivalii
- Eugenia pittieri
- Eugenia plicatocostata
- Eugenia pubiflora
- Eugenia sessiliflora
- Eugenia tahanensis, synonym of Syzygium tahanense
- Eugenia tecta, synonym of Syzygium tectum
- Eugenia tekuensis, synonym of Syzygium tekuense
- Eugenia tephrogyna
- Eugenia truncata
- Eugenia uliginosa
- Eugenia vacana
- Eugenia valvata
- Eugenia verdoorniae
- Eugenia virgultosa, synonym of Eugenia biflora
- Eugenia viscacea
- Eugenia watsoniana, synonym of Syzygium watsonianum
- Eugenia wullschlaegeliana
- Kunzea amathicola
- Kunzea ericoides
- Kunzea linearis
- Melaleuca brongniartii
- Melaleuca gnidioides
- Melaleuca pancheri
- Melaleuca sphaerodendra
- Metrosideros cacuminum
- Metrosideros dolichandra
- Metrosideros elegans
- Metrosideros oreomyrtus
- Metrosideros porphyrea
- Metrosideros tetrasticha
- Mosiera longipes
- Mosiera xerophytica
- Myrceugenia miersiana
- Myrceugenia reitzii
- Myrceugenia scutellata
- Myrceugenia venosa
- Myrcia aequatoriensis
- Myrcia cardiaca
- Myrcia ehrenbergiana
- Myrcia glabra
- Myrcia ishoaquinicca
- Myrcia killipii
- Myrcia lanuginosa
- Myrcia ligustrina
- Myrcia pittieri
- Myrcia polygama
- Myrcia ramuliflora
- Myrcia reitzii
- Myrcia sparsiflora
- Myrcia strigosa
- Myrcia teuscheriana
- Myrcia tocantinensis
- Myrcia zetekiana
- Myrcianthes alaternifolia
- Myrcianthes lindleyana
- Neomitranthes stictophylla
- Octamyrtus arfakensis
- Pimenta jamaicensis
- Plinia grandifolia
- Plinia phitrantha
- Plinia povedae
- Psidium bahianum
- Psidium canum
- Psidium cauliflorum
- Psidium cinereum, synonym of Psidium grandifolium
- Psidium ganevii
- Psidium harrisianum
- Rhodamnia novoguineensis
- Rhodomyrtus locellata
- Siphoneugena kiaerskoviana
- Siphoneugena minima
- Syzygium alvarezii
- Syzygium aoupinianum
- Syzygium apetiolatum
- Syzygium astronioides
- Syzygium auriculatum
- Syzygium baeuerlenii
- Syzygium balgooyi
- Syzygium beccarii
- Syzygium bicostatum
- Syzygium boulindaense
- Syzygium chaii
- Syzygium cinnamomeum
- Syzygium coalitum
- Syzygium conglobatum
- Syzygium crassipes
- Syzygium dispansum
- Syzygium erythropetalum
- Syzygium francii
- Syzygium goniocalyx
- Syzygium houttuynii
- Syzygium houttuyniifolia
- Syzygium keysseri
- Syzygium laxiflorum
- Syzygium linocieroideum
- Syzygium longifolium
- Syzygium luzonense
- Syzygium micklethwaitii
- Syzygium millsii
- Syzygium mundagam
- Syzygium munroi
- Syzygium pallidum
- Syzygium panduriforme
- Syzygium paucivenium
- Syzygium petakense
- Syzygium phaeostictum
- Syzygium polycephaloides
- Syzygium polycephalum
- Syzygium porphyrocarpum
- Syzygium pseudopinnatum
- Syzygium pteropodum
- Syzygium quadrangulare
- Syzygium robbinsii
- Syzygium roseomarginatum
- Syzygium seemannianum
- Syzygium simile
- Syzygium subrotundifolium
- Syzygium sylvicola
- Syzygium taeniatum
- Syzygium trachyanthum
- Syzygium valdecoriaceum
- Syzygium variifolium
- Temu cruckshanksii
- Tristaniopsis microcarpa
- Tristaniopsis razakiana
- Tristaniopsis rubiginosa
- Xanthomyrtus angustifolia
- Xanthomyrtus diplycosiifolia
- Xanthomyrtus polyclada
- Xanthomyrtus scolopacina
- Xanthostemon speciosus

==== Onagraceae ====
- Epilobium psilotum
- Fuchsia lehmannii

=== Oxalidales ===
- Sarcotheca monophylla

=== Piperales ===
Species

- Peperomia abnormis
- Peperomia guttulata
- Peperomia thomeana
- Piper cordulatum
- Piper fimbriulatum
- Piper lucigaudens
- Piper verrucosum

Varieties

- Piper augustum var. cocleanum

=== Plumbaginales ===
- Aegialitis rotundifolia
- Armeria rouyana
- Limonium arborescens
- Limonium cymuliferum
- Limonium insulare
- Limonium mouretii
- Limonium pseudolaetum

=== Podostemales ===
- Dicraeia dichotoma
- Indotristicha tirunelveliana
- Paracladopus chantaburiensis
- Polypleurum erectum
- Polypleurum longicaule
- Polypleurum longifolium

=== Proteales ===
- Faurea macnaughtonii
- Helicia albiflora
- Helicia amplifolia
- Helicia latifolia
- Heliciopsis montana
- Heliciopsis whitmorei
- Leucadendron strobilinum
- Protea comptonii

=== Ranunculales ===
- Aconitum austrokoreense
- Anisocycla blepharosepala
- Berberis beauverdiana
- Berberis minzaensis
- Corydalis gotlandica
- Hamadryas argentea, silvery buttercup
- Hyperbaena eladioana
- Hyperbaena brevipes
- Hyperbaena prioriana
- Hyperbaena valida
- Papaver sjunicicum, Syunik poppy
- Platytinospora buchholzii
- Pulsatilla vulgaris
- Ranunculus batrachioides
- Sarcolophium suberosum

=== Rosales ===
==== Cunoniaceae ====
Species

- Ackama clemensiae
- Codia mackeeana
- Cunonia aoupiniensis
- Cunonia bullata
- Cunonia dickisonii
- Cunonia rotundifolia
- Cunonia vieillardii
- Eucryphia cordifolia
- Hooglandia ignambiensis
- Pancheria ferruginea
- Pancheria humboldtiana
- Pancheria reticulata
- Spiraeanthemum parvifolium
- Weinmannia boliviensis
- Weinmannia exigua, synonym of Pterophylla exigua
- Weinmannia karsteniana
- Weinmannia laxiramea
- Weinmannia luzoniensis, synonym of Pterophylla luzoniensis
- Weinmannia marquesana, synonym of Pterophylla marquesana
- Weinmannia paitensis, synonym of Pterophylla paitensis
- Weinmannia paulliniifolia
- Weinmannia raiateensis, synonym of Pterophylla raiateensis

Varieties

- Weinmannia laurina var. laurina

==== Moraceae ====
Species

- Artocarpus brevipedunculatus
- Artocarpus camansi
- Artocarpus clementis
- Artocarpus corneri
- Artocarpus gomezianus
- Artocarpus humilis
- Artocarpus hypargyreus
- Artocarpus kemando
- Artocarpus lamellosus
- Artocarpus maingayi
- Artocarpus melinoxylus
- Artocarpus odoratissimus
- Artocarpus scortechinii
- Dorstenia gigas
- Dorstenia goetzei
- Dorstenia oligogyna
- Dorstenia warneckei
- Ficus adolphi-friderici
- Ficus androchaete
- Ficus aspera
- Ficus bambusifolia
- Ficus bruneiensis
- Ficus caatingae
- Ficus cassidyana
- Ficus cordatula
- Ficus cyclophylla
- Ficus densistipulata
- Ficus endospermifolia
- Ficus erinobotrya
- Ficus eumorpha
- Ficus gibbsiae
- Ficus gigantifolia
- Ficus leptocalama
- Ficus lindsayana
- Ficus lowii
- Ficus merrittii
- Ficus microsphaera
- Ficus pachyneura
- Ficus papuana
- Ficus pseudowassa
- Ficus scopulifera
- Ficus spathulifolia
- Ficus sublimbata
- Ficus trachelosyce
- Mesogyne insignis
- Milicia excelsa
- Paratrophis banksii
- Paratrophis sclerophylla

Varieties

- Dorstenia hildebrandtii var. hildebrandtii

==== Rhamnaceae ====
- Bathiorhamnus macrocarpus
- Berchemia cinerascens
- Emmenosperma pancherianum
- Frangula ulei
- Gouania pannigera
- Reynosia guama
- Reynosia krugii
- Rhamnus integrifolia
- Rhamnus rosei
- Sarcomphalus havanensis
- Trymalium urceolare
- Ventilago pseudocalyculata

==== Rosaceae ====
Species

- Alchemilla bursensis
- Alchemilla jaroschenkoi, holotrichous lady's mantle
- Aria devoniensis, Devon whitebeam
- Cotoneaster granatensis
- Geum peckii
- Polylepis tarapacana
- Polylepis tomentella
- Polylepis weberbaueri
- Potentilla maura
- Prunus buxifolia
- Prunus clementis
- Prunus kinabaluensis
- Prunus transarisanensis
- Pyrus anatolica
- Pyrus elata, tall pear
- Pyrus oxyprion
- Pyrus salicifolia
- Rosa zakatalensis, Zakatalian brier
- Sanguisorba dodecandra
- Sorbus lancastriensis, Lancashire whitebeam

Subspecies

- Polylepis tomentella subsp. tomentella
- Sorbus austriaca subsp. croatica

Varieties

- Prunus trichamygdalus var. elongata

==== Other Rosales ====
Species

- Brunellia farallonensis
- Brunellia ovalifolia
- Cecropia multiflora
- Cecropia pastasana
- Celtis jamaicensis
- Chrysosplenium dubium
- Corokia macrocarpa
- Coussapoa jatun-sachensis
- Ellipanthus hemandradenioides
- Eucryphia cordifolia
- Eucryphia glutinosa
- Gyrotaenia microcarpa
- Gyrotaenia spicata
- Hemandradenia mannii
- Licania velutina
- Pilea jamesonia
- Pilea serratifolia
- Pilea trichosanthes
- Pittosporum koghiense
- Pittosporum obcordatum, heart-leaved kohuhu
- Pittosporum turneri, Turner's kohuhu
- Pittosporum virgatum
- Platyspermation crassifolium
- Pourouma petiolulata
- Tylecodon aridimontanus
- Tylecodon aurusbergensis
- Urera expansa
- Zelkova carpinifolia

Subspecies

- Brunellia grandiflora subsp. grandiflora

Varieties

- Brunellia inermis var. inermis
- Grevea eggelingii var. eggelingii

=== Santalales ===
Species

- Acanthosyris annonagustata
- Heisteria asplundii
- Minquartia guianensis, Black manwood
- Psittacanthus barlowii
- Schoepfia multiflora
- Viscum littorum

Varieties

- Santalum insulare var. insulare
- Santalum insulare var. raiateense

=== Sapindales ===
There are 113 species, six subspecies, and three varieties in the order Sapindales assessed as near threatened.

==== Anacardiaceae ====
Species

- Mangifera andamanica
- Cardenasiodendron brachypterum
- Comocladia velutina
- Gluta beccarii
- Gluta capituliflora
- Gluta lanceolata
- Gluta travancorica
- Lannea transulta
- Melanochyla angustifolia
- Melanochyla auriculata
- Melanochyla scalarinervis
- Nothopegia heyneana
- Parishia maingayi
- Parishia paucijuga
- Pistacia aethiopica
- Pistacia atlantica
- Pistacia vera, pistachio
- Rhus aucheri
- Rhus delavayi
- Semecarpus auriculata
- Semecarpus heterophyllus
- Trichoscypha bijuga

Subspecies

- Rhus glutinosa subsp. abyssinica

Varieties

- Lannea schweinfurthii var. acutifoliolata
- Lannea welwitschii var. ciliolata

==== Burseraceae ====
Species

- Boswellia pirottae
- Boswellia sacra
- Bursera lunanii
- Canarium pseudosumatranum
- Canarium reniforme
- Commiphora albiflora
- Commiphora ciliata
- Commiphora corrugata
- Commiphora guidottii
- Commiphora hodai
- Commiphora mafaidoha
- Commiphora obovata
- Commiphora ornifolia
- Commiphora parvifolia
- Commiphora planifrons
- Commiphora pseudopaolii
- Commiphora socotrana
- Commiphora sphaerophylla
- Commiphora sulcata
- Commiphora truncata
- Commiphora unilobata
- Dacryodes kingii
- Dacryodes nervosa
- Protium panamense

Subspecies

- Commiphora campestris subsp. campestris

==== Meliaceae ====
Species

- Aglaia agglomerata
- Aglaia crassinervia
- Aglaia edulis
- Aglaia erythrosperma
- Aglaia euryanthera
- Aglaia exstipulata
- Aglaia flavida
- Aglaia forbesii
- Aglaia foveolata
- Aglaia glabrata
- Aglaia grandis
- Aglaia hiernii
- Aglaia korthalsii
- Aglaia lepidopetala
- Aglaia leptantha
- Aglaia luzoniensis
- Aglaia macrocarpa
- Aglaia meridionalis
- Aglaia monozyga
- Aglaia multinervis
- Aglaia odorata
- Aglaia oligophylla
- Aglaia pachyphylla
- Aglaia palembanica
- Aglaia parviflora
- Aglaia rimosa
- Aglaia rubiginosa
- Aglaia rufinervis
- Aglaia rugulosa
- Aglaia samoensis
- Aglaia sexipetala
- Aglaia silvestris
- Aglaia simplicifolia
- Aglaia squamulosa
- Aglaia subcuprea
- Aglaia teysmanniana
- Aglaia vitiensis, Lindiyango
- Guarea venenata
- Lovoa swynnertonii, brown mahogany
- Pseudobersama mossambicensis
- Swietenia mahagoni, American mahogany
- Trichilia grandifolia
- Trichilia lecointei
- Trichilia pallens
- Trichilia pseudostipularis
- Trichilia reticulata

Subspecies

- Cabralea canjerana subsp. polytricha

==== Rutaceae ====
Species

- Acronychia porteri
- Flindersia amboinensis
- Flindersia schottiana
- Geijera salicifolia
- Glycosmis decipiens
- Melicope nukuhivensis
- Melicope tahitensis
- Oriciopsis glaberrima
- Spathelia glabrescens
- Terminthodia viridiflora
- Tetractomia majus
- Vepris suaveolens
- Zanthoxylum kauaense, Kauai prickly-ash

Subspecies

- Esenbeckia pentaphylla subsp. pentaphylla

Varieties

- Zanthoxylum dipetalum var. dipetalum

==== Sapindaceae ====
Species

- Acer erythranthum
- Acer undulatum
- Aesculus hippocastanum, Horse chestnut
- Allophylus rhoidiphyllus
- Amesiodendron chinense
- Atalaya capensis, Cape wing-nut
- Bottegoa insignis
- Chytranthus mannii
- Cupania mollis
- Deinbollia longiacuminata
- Dipteronia sinensis
- Dimocarpus longan, Longan
- Erythrophysa septentrionalis
- Eurycorymbus cavaleriei
- Podonephelium concolor

Subspecies

- Stadmannia oppositifolia subsp. rhodesiaca

==== Other Sapindales ====
Species

- Bulnesia sarmientoi
- Guaiacum coulteri
- Leitneria floridana, Corkwood

Subspecies

- Kirkia burgeri subsp. somalensis

=== Saxifragales ===
- Cercidiphyllum japonicum, Katsura tree
- Saxifraga valdensis
- Semiliquidambar cathayensis
- Sinowilsonia henryi

=== Solanales ===
There are 20 species and one subspecies in the order Solanales assessed as near threatened.

==== Convolvulaceae ====
- Convolvulus caput-medusae

==== Menyanthaceae ====
- Nymphoides tenuissima

==== Solanaceae ====
Species

- Aureliana fasciculata
- Cuatresia harlingiana
- Cyphomandra diploconos
- Nothocestrum longifolium, long-leaved nothocestrum
- Solanum bellum
- Solanum bullatum
- Solanum cajanumense
- Solanum cinnamomeum
- Solanum fallax
- Solanum granulosum-leprosum, Solanum granuloso-leprosum
- Solanum hypocalycosarcum
- Solanum inaequale
- Solanum latiflorum
- Solanum leucodendron
- Solanum melissarum
- Solanum pancheri
- Solanum pinetorum
- Solanum tobagense

Subspecies

- Solanum diversifolium subsp. diversifolium

=== Violales ===
- Bivinia jalbertii
- Casearia coriifolia
- Cylicomorpha solmsii
- Homalium henriquesii
- Hydnocarpus cucurbitina
- Hydnocarpus nana
- Lasiochlamys trichostemona
- Melicytus flexuosus
- Nasa humboldtiana
- Nasa loxensis
- Oncoba ovalis
- Paropsia braunii
- Passiflora reflexiflora
- Passiflora sodiroi
- Pseudoscolopia polyantha
- Rawsonia reticulata
- Rinorea crenata
- Rinorea endotricha
- Rinorea hirsuta
- Rinorea keayi
- Rinorea squamata
- Ryparosa scortechinii
- Vasconcellea pulchra
- Vasconcellea sprucei
- Viola delphinantha
- Xylosma fawcettii

=== Vitales ===
- Leea tinctoria

=== Zygophyllales ===
- Guaiacum sanctum

== Monocotyledons ==
=== Alismatales ===
- Baldellia alpestris
- Baldellia ranunculoides, Lesser water-plantain
- Halophila engelmanni, Stargrass
- Halophila nipponica
- Najas marina subsp. ehrenbergii, Spiny naiad
- Ottelia scabra
- Posidonia australis
- Zostera asiatica
- Zostera caulescens

=== Arales ===
There are 21 species in Arales assessed as near threatened.

==== Araceae ====
- Amorphophallus ochroleucus
- Anthurium angustilaminatum
- Anthurium aristatum
- Anthurium campii
- Anthurium falcatum
- Anthurium furcatum
- Anthurium grex-avium
- Anthurium holm-nielsenii
- Anthurium maculosum
- Anthurium nigropunctatum
- Anthurium pallatangense
- Anthurium puberulinervium
- Anthurium sparreorum
- Arum hygrophilum, Water arum
- Biarum davisii
- Callopsis volkensii
- Cryptocoryne consobrina
- Cryptocoryne cruddasiana
- Philodendron rugosum
- Xanthosoma weeksii

==== Lemnaceae ====
- Lemna yungensis

=== Arecales ===
Species

- Actinokentia huerlimannii
- Adonidia merrillii, Manila palm
- Areca abdulrahmanii
- Areca hutchinsoniana
- Areca novohibernica
- Astrocaryum alatum
- Attalea tessmannii
- Bactris caudata
- Bactris setulosa
- Basselinia deplanchei
- Basselinia humboldtiana
- Basselinia velutina
- Brongniartikentia lanuginosa
- Calamus godefroyi
- Chambeyronia lepidota
- Chelyocarpus dianeurus
- Clinostigma harlandii
- Cryosophila guagara
- Cryosophila kalbreyeri
- Cryosophila nana
- Cyrtostachys elegans
- Dypsis ankirindro
- Dypsis concinna
- Dypsis confusa
- Dypsis coriacea
- Dypsis crinita
- Dypsis dransfieldii
- Dypsis fasciculata
- Dypsis heterophylla
- Dypsis hildebrandtii
- Dypsis lutescens, synonym of Chrysalidocarpus lutescens
- Dypsis mananjarensis
- Dypsis mocquerysiana
- Dypsis procumbens
- Hyospathe macrorhachis
- Hyphaene dichotoma
- Linospadix microcaryus (Note: Listed by IUCN as Linospadix microcarya.)
- Linospadix palmerianus
- Livistona alfredii, millstream palm
- Livistona endauensis
- Livistona mariae, Central Australian cabbage palm
- Livistona tahanensis
- Mauritia carana
- Metroxylon amicarum, Caroline ivory nut
- Moratia cerifera
- Nenga gajah
- Oncosperma fasciculatum
- Orania decipiens
- Orania sylvicola
- Phoenix paludosa, mangrove date palm
- Phoenix rupicola
- Phoenix theophrasti, Theophrastus's date palm
- Physokentia tete
- Physokentia thurstonii
- Phytelephas aequatorialis
- Phytelephas seemannii
- Pinanga subruminata
- Prestoea tenuiramosa, Guyana manicole palm
- Pritchardia thurstonii
- Ptychosperma gracile
- Ravenea robustior
- Rhopaloblaste singaporensis
- Rhopalostylis sapida, Nikau
- Roscheria melanochaetes
- Roystonea princeps, morass cabbage palm
- Syagrus botryophora
- Veitchia metiti
- Veitchia spiralis
- Verschaffeltia splendida
- Washingtonia filifera, desert palm
- Wettinia castanea
- Wodyetia bifurcata, foxtail palm

Varieties

- Rhopalostylis baueri var. baueri
- Rhopalostylis baueri var. cheesemanii

=== Asparagales ===
==== Orchidaceae ====
- Aerangis macrocentra
- Anathallis comayaguensis
- Angraecum atlanticum
- Angraecum penzigianum
- Appendicula tenuispica
- Barbosella geminata
- Barombia gracillima
- Benthamia cinnabarina
- Benthamia glaberrima
- Benthamia monophylla
- Bulbophyllum breviflorum
- Bulbophyllum hamelinii
- Bulbophyllum porphyrostachys
- Ceratostylis micrantha
- Cynorkis buchwaldiana
- Cypripedium arietinum, Ram's head lady slipper
- Cypripedium molle, Soft cypripedium
- Cypripedium shanxiense, Shanxi cypripedium
- Cypripedium yatabeanum, Yatabe's cypripedium
- Dactylorhiza baumanniana, Baumann's dactylorhiza
- Dactylorhiza euxina
- Dendrophylax funalis, corded ghost orchid
- Disa extinctoria
- Dracula ripleyana, Ripley's dracula
- Epidendrum cocoense
- Epidendrum insulanum
- Gonatostylis vieillardii
- Gymnadenia runei
- Habenaria microceras
- Huntleya vargasii
- Lankesterella gnomus, Gnome-like lankesterella
- Lemurella virescens
- Malaxis wendtii, Wendt's adder's-mouth
- Masdevallia oreas, Mountain masdevallia
- Ophrys kotschyi, Kotschy's ophrys
- Ophrys lunulata, Lunulate ophrys
- Paphiopedilum philippinense, Philippine paphiopedilum
- Pelexia goyazensis
- Pholidota chinensis
- Phragmipedium caricinum, Reed grass-like phragmipedium
- Platanthera integrilabia, White fringeless orchid
- Pleurothallis caymanensis
- Polystachya testuana
- Selenipedium palmifolium, Palm-leaf selenipedium
- Serapias neglecta, Neglected serapias
- Serapias nurrica
- Serapias olbia
- Spiranthes infernalis, Ash meadows ladies'-tresses
- Stelis itatiayae
- Telipogon biolleyi

==== Other Asparagales ====
Species

- Allium lojaconoi, Maltese dwarf garlic
- Allium melananthum
- Aloe bargalensis
- Aloe congdonii
- Aloe deserti
- Aloe heliderana
- Aloe hemmingii
- Aloe jawiyon
- Aloe medishiana
- Aloe percrassa
- Aloe perryi
- Aloe pubescens
- Aloe richardsiae
- Aloe schoelleri
- Aloe steudneri
- Aloe tewoldei
- Crocus etruscus
- Galanthus nivalis, Bucaneve
- Geissorhiza outeniquensis
- Gladiolus usambarensis
- Iris atrofusca, Jal'ad iris

Subspecies

- Aloe volkensii subsp. volkensii

=== Bromeliales ===
- Aechmea napoensis
- Greigia sodiroana
- Guzmania foetida
- Guzmania fosteriana
- Guzmania septata
- Guzmania teuscheri
- Guzmania xanthobractea
- Navia octopoides
- Pitcairnia cosangaensis
- Pitcairnia dodsonii
- Pitcairnia pavonii
- Pitcairnia simulans
- Pitcairnia sodiroi
- Puya nutans
- Racinaea pseudotetrantha
- Racinaea quadripinnata
- Racinaea sinuosa
- Tillandsia cardenasii
- Tillandsia cyanea
- Tillandsia paniculata
- Tillandsia sceptriformis
- Tillandsia spathacea
- Vriesea arpocalyx
- Vriesea boeghii

=== Commelinales ===
- Commelina arenicola
- Cyanotis ake-assii

=== Dioscoreales ===
- Dioscorea balcanica
- Dioscorea rimbachii

=== Liliales ===
Species

- Bomarea brachysepala
- Bomarea glaucescens
- Gagea mauritanica
- Gagea polymorpha, Changing gagea
- Gagea trinervia
- Tulipa dubia
- Tulipa hungarica
- Tulipa ingens

Subspecies

- Veratrum mengtzeanum subsp. phuwae

=== Pandanales ===
- Asplundia fagerlindii
- Dicranopygium euryphyllum
- Pandanus clandestinus
- Pandanus multispicatus
- Pandanus papenooensis
- Pandanus rabaiensis
- Pandanus sechellarum, Seychelles pandanus
- Sphaeradenia sanctae-barbarae

=== Poales ===
There are 45 species, two subspecies, and one variety in Cyperales assessed as near threatened.

==== Cyperaceae ====
Species

- Bulbostylis clarkeana
- Bulbostylis lombardii
- Carex cretica, Crete sedge
- Carex hultenii
- Carex iraqensis
- Carex kashmirensis
- Carex preussii
- Carex tricephala
- Carex troodi, Troodos mount sedge
- Carex walkeri
- Carex yulungshanensis
- Carpha angustissima
- Coleochloa virgata
- Cyperus afroalpinus
- Cyperus sensilis
- Rhynchospora jamaicensis, Jamaican beaksedge
- Rhynchospora rostrata
- Scirpus ancistrochaetus
- Scleria robinsoniana
- Trianoptiles capensis

Subspecies

- Bulbostylis schoenoides subsp. erratica

==== Eriocaulaceae ====
- Eriocaulon barbeyanum
- Eriocaulon gregatum

==== Juncaceae ====
- Juncus heterophyllus
- Juncus valvatus

==== Poaceae ====
Species

- Agropyron tanaiticum, Don wheatgrass
- Agrostis mannii
- Agrostis tenerrima
- Anthosachne sacandros
- Anthoxanthum borii
- Aulonemia longiaristata
- Chusquea leonardiorum
- Echinolaena ecuadoriana, synonym of Oedochloa ecuadoriana
- Fargesia ferax
- Fargesia orbiculata
- Festuca balcanica
- Festuca flacca
- Festuca glumosa
- Helictotrichon mannii
- Mnesithea annua
- Myriocladus steyermarkii
- Nastus elongatus, Spider bamboo
- Neurolepis nana
- Neurolepis rigida
- Oligostachyum shiuyingianum
- Panicum pleianthum
- Paspalum acutifolium
- Poa pseudobulbosa
- Rhytachne megastachya
- Saccharum viguieri

Subspecies

- Agrostis mannii subsp. mannii

Varieties

- Pentameris pictigluma var. mannii

==== Xyridaceae ====
- Xyris angustifolia
- Xyris subsetigera

=== Zingiberales ===
- Amomum calcicolum
- Amomum tsao-ko, Tsao-ko cardamom
- Calathea ecuadoriana
- Calathea pallidicosta
- Calathea paucifolia
- Calathea plurispicata
- Calathea utilis
- Calathea veitchiana
- Costus glaucus
- Costus montanus
- Curcuma alismatifolia, Siam tulip
- Curcuma sparganiifolia
- Ensete superbum
- Hedychium glabrum
- Heliconia sclerotricha
- Renealmia dolichocalyx
- Renealmia sessilifolia
- Zingiber fragile

== See also ==
- Lists of IUCN Red List near threatened species
- List of least concern plants
- List of vulnerable plants
- List of endangered plants
- List of critically endangered plants
- List of recently extinct plants
- List of data deficient plants
