= Pitcairnia pavonii =

Conservation status
- Near Threatened (IUCN 3.1)

Scientific classification
- Kingdom: Plantae
- Clade: Embryophytes
- Clade: Tracheophytes
- Clade: Spermatophytes
- Clade: Angiosperms
- Clade: Monocots
- Clade: Commelinids
- Order: Poales
- Family: Bromeliaceae
- Genus: Pitcairnia
- Species: P. pavonii

Binomial name
- Pitcairnia pavonii (Mez) Mez

Synonyms
- Homotypic Synonyms: Hepetis pavonii Mez

Species of flowering plant

Pitcairnia pavonii is a species of flowering plant in the family Bromeliaceae. It is endemic to Ecuador. Its natural habitats are subtropical or tropical moist montane forests, subtropical or tropical dry shrubland, and subtropical or tropical high-altitude shrubland. It is threatened by habitat loss.
