= Disa extinctoria =

Conservation status
- Near Threatened (IUCN 3.1)

Scientific classification
- Kingdom: Plantae
- Clade: Embryophytes
- Clade: Tracheophytes
- Clade: Spermatophytes
- Clade: Angiosperms
- Clade: Monocots
- Order: Asparagales
- Family: Orchidaceae
- Subfamily: Orchidoideae
- Genus: Disa
- Species: D. extinctoria

Binomial name
- Disa extinctoria Rchb.f.

Species of flowering plant

Disa extincttoria is a perennial plant and geophyte belonging to the genus Disa. The plant is native to Eswatini, Limpopo and Mpumalanga and occurs from Tzaneen to Eswatini. The plant grows in wet grasslands and swamps at altitudes of 1000 - 1300 m. It has an area of occurrence of 16 000 km2. Any activity that affects the water table affects the plant. Drainage such as the construction of golf courses, trout dams and invasive plants, affects the water table. Urban growth and invasive plants have also affected the plant's population.
