= Psittacanthus barlowii =

Conservation status
- Near Threatened (IUCN 3.1)

Scientific classification
- Kingdom: Plantae
- Clade: Tracheophytes
- Clade: Angiosperms
- Clade: Eudicots
- Order: Santalales
- Family: Loranthaceae
- Genus: Psittacanthus
- Species: P. barlowii

Binomial name
- Psittacanthus barlowii Kuijt

Species of mistletoe

Psittacanthus barlowii is a species of plant of the genus, Psittacanthus, in the family Loranthaceae. It is endemic to Ecuador. Its natural habitat is subtropical or tropical moist lowland forests.
