= Capparis discolor =

Conservation status
- Near Threatened (IUCN 2.3)

Scientific classification
- Kingdom: Plantae
- Clade: Tracheophytes
- Clade: Angiosperms
- Clade: Eudicots
- Clade: Rosids
- Order: Brassicales
- Family: Capparaceae
- Genus: Capparis
- Species: C. discolor

Binomial name
- Capparis discolor J.D. Smith

Species of flowering plant

Capparis discolor is a species of plant in the Capparaceae family. It is found in Colombia, Costa Rica, Mexico, Nicaragua, and Panama. It is threatened by habitat loss.
