= Eugenia marchiana =

Conservation status
- Near Threatened (IUCN 2.3)

Scientific classification
- Kingdom: Plantae
- Clade: Tracheophytes
- Clade: Angiosperms
- Clade: Eudicots
- Clade: Rosids
- Order: Myrtales
- Family: Myrtaceae
- Genus: Eugenia
- Species: E. marchiana

Binomial name
- Eugenia marchiana Griseb.

Species of flowering plant

Eugenia marchiana is a species of plant in the family Myrtaceae. It is endemic to Jamaica. It is threatened by habitat loss.
