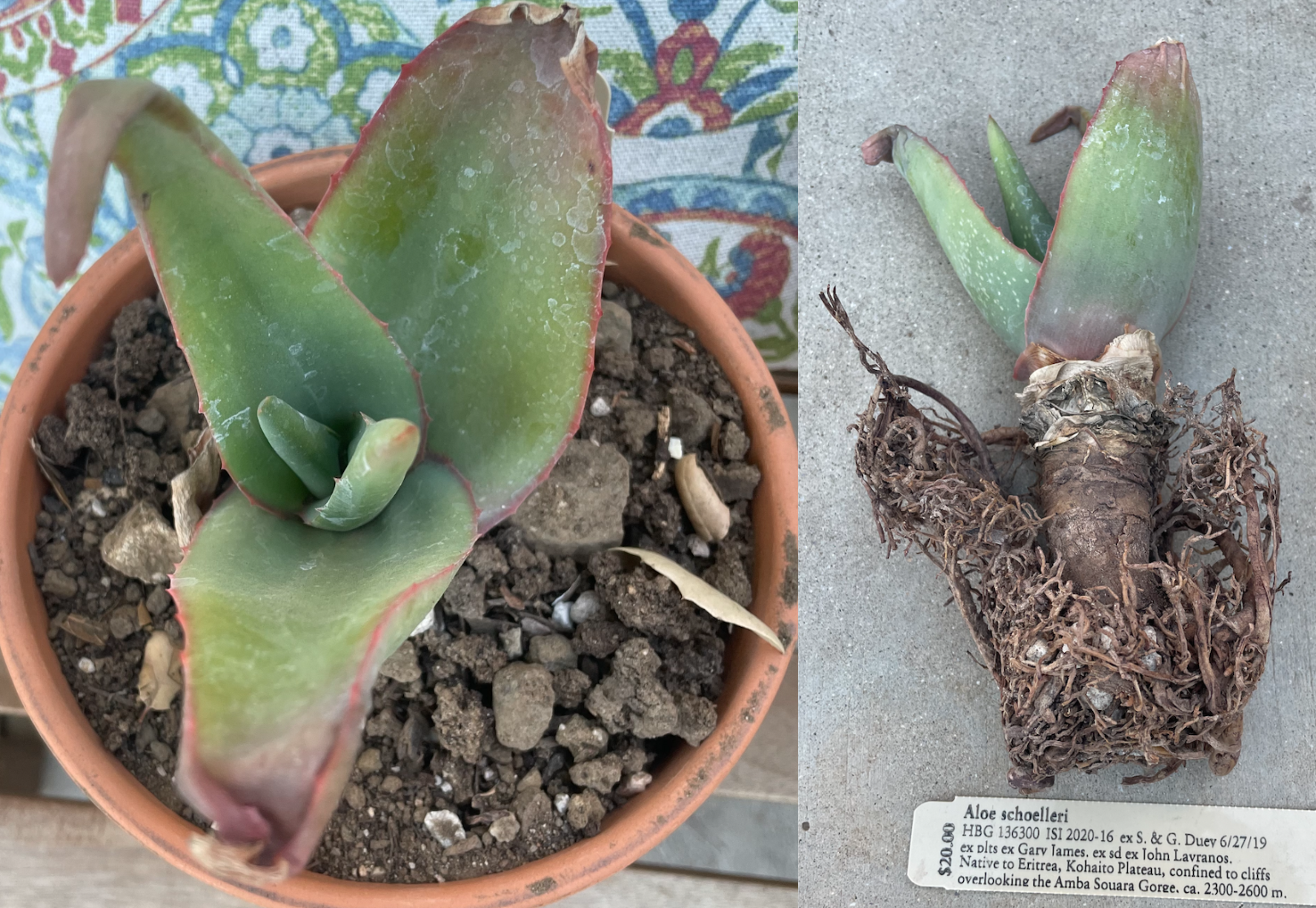

Conservation status
- Near Threatened (IUCN 3.1)
- CITES Appendix II (CITES)

Scientific classification
- Kingdom: Plantae
- Clade: Tracheophytes
- Clade: Angiosperms
- Clade: Monocots
- Order: Asparagales
- Family: Asphodelaceae
- Subfamily: Asphodeloideae
- Genus: Aloe
- Species: A. schoelleri

Binomial name
- Aloe schoelleri Schweinf.

= Aloe schoelleri =

Species of plant

Aloe schoelleri is a species of Aloe native to Eritrea, on the cliffs above Amba Souara Gorge.

== Description ==
When the plants are in drought, the leaves are gray-green, and will be curved in and purple. In cultivation however, it will be green, erect and have very obvious red margins with small widely spaced teeth. Plants can get very large.

== Flowers ==
Flowers grow on very long racemes, and are pastel orange, and run along around half of each raceme. May branch. The stamens are a more bright orange color.
