= Vriesea boeghii =

Conservation status
- Near Threatened (IUCN 3.1)

Scientific classification
- Kingdom: Plantae
- Clade: Tracheophytes
- Clade: Angiosperms
- Clade: Monocots
- Clade: Commelinids
- Order: Poales
- Family: Bromeliaceae
- Genus: Vriesea
- Species: V. boeghii

Binomial name
- Vriesea boeghii H.Luther

Synonyms
- Tillandsia boeghii (H.E.Luther) J.R.Grant

Species of epiphyte

Vriesea boeghii is a species of plant in the family Bromeliaceae, endemic to Loja Province in Ecuador. Its natural habitats are subtropical or tropical moist montane forests and subtropical or tropical high-altitude shrubland. It is threatened by habitat loss.
