= Vriesea arpocalyx =

Conservation status
- Near Threatened (IUCN 3.1)

Scientific classification
- Kingdom: Plantae
- Clade: Tracheophytes
- Clade: Angiosperms
- Clade: Monocots
- Clade: Commelinids
- Order: Poales
- Family: Bromeliaceae
- Genus: Vriesea
- Species: V. arpocalyx

Binomial name
- Vriesea arpocalyx (Andrè) L.B.Sm.

Synonyms
- Tillandsia arpocalyx André

Species of plant

Vriesea arpocalyx is a species of plant in the family Bromeliaceae. It is endemic to Ecuador. Its natural habitats are subtropical or tropical moist montane forests and subtropical or tropical dry shrubland, at altitudes of 1500–3000 m. It is threatened by habitat loss, mostly through wildfires.
