= Peperomia thomeana =

Conservation status
- Near Threatened (IUCN 2.3)

Scientific classification
- Kingdom: Plantae
- Clade: Tracheophytes
- Clade: Angiosperms
- Clade: Magnoliids
- Order: Piperales
- Family: Piperaceae
- Genus: Peperomia
- Species: P. thomeana

Binomial name
- Peperomia thomeana C.DC.

Species of flowering plant

Peperomia thomeana is a species of plant in the family Piperaceae. It is found in Cameroon, Equatorial Guinea, and São Tomé and Príncipe. Its natural habitat is subtropical or tropical dry forests. It is threatened by habitat loss.

== Physical description ==
This plant has very slender branches with alternating obovate-oblong leaves that are each approximately 2 inches (5.08 cm) in length and 1 inch (2.54 cm) in diameter.
