= Piper verrucosum =

Conservation status
- Near Threatened (IUCN 2.3)

Scientific classification
- Kingdom: Plantae
- Clade: Tracheophytes
- Clade: Angiosperms
- Clade: Magnoliids
- Order: Piperales
- Family: Piperaceae
- Genus: Piper
- Species: P. verrucosum

Binomial name
- Piper verrucosum Sw.

Species of flowering plant

Piper verrucosum is a species of plant in the family Piperaceae. It is endemic to Jamaica.
