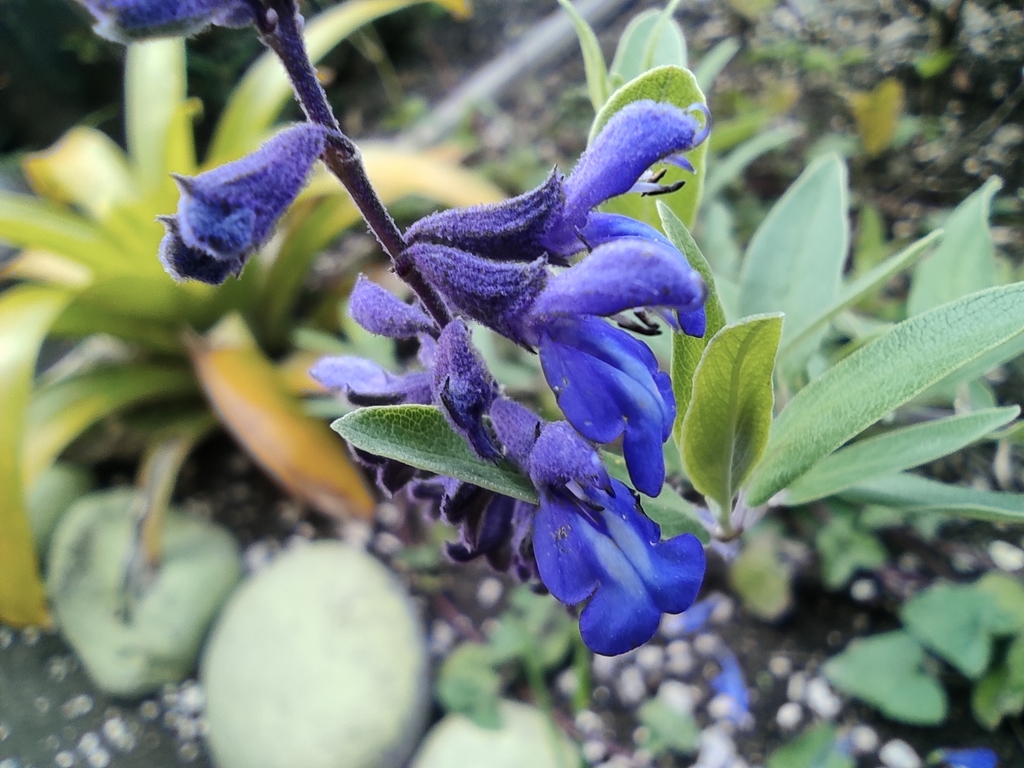

Conservation status
- Near Threatened (IUCN 3.1)

Scientific classification
- Kingdom: Plantae
- Clade: Embryophytes
- Clade: Tracheophytes
- Clade: Spermatophytes
- Clade: Angiosperms
- Clade: Eudicots
- Clade: Asterids
- Order: Lamiales
- Family: Lamiaceae
- Genus: Salvia
- Species: S. humboltiana

Binomial name
- Salvia humboltiana F.Dietr.

= Salvia humboldtiana =

Species of plant

Salvia humboldtiana is a species of flowering plant in the family Lamiaceae, endemic to Ecuador. Its natural habitat is subtropical or tropical dry valley shrubland.
