= Euphorbia smithii =

Conservation status
- Near Threatened (IUCN 2.3)

Scientific classification
- Kingdom: Plantae
- Clade: Tracheophytes
- Clade: Angiosperms
- Clade: Eudicots
- Clade: Rosids
- Order: Malpighiales
- Family: Euphorbiaceae
- Genus: Euphorbia
- Species: E. smithii

Binomial name
- Euphorbia smithii S.Carter

Species of flowering plant

Euphorbia smithii is a species of plant in the family Euphorbiaceae. It is endemic to Oman. It is threatened by habitat loss.
