= Cyperus afroalpinus =

Conservation status
- Near Threatened (IUCN 3.1)

Scientific classification
- Kingdom: Plantae
- Clade: Embryophytes
- Clade: Tracheophytes
- Clade: Spermatophytes
- Clade: Angiosperms
- Clade: Monocots
- Clade: Commelinids
- Order: Poales
- Family: Cyperaceae
- Genus: Cyperus
- Species: C. afroalpinus

Binomial name
- Cyperus afroalpinus Lye

Species of plant native to Africa

Cyperus afroalpinus is a species of sedge that is native to Africa and was described by the botanist Kåre Arnstein Lye in 1983.

== Description ==
The slender and perennial sedge typically grows to a height of around 40 cm (16 in) with a short creeping rhizome and have multiple, crowded culms with a length of 24 to 36 cm (9.4 to 14.2 in) and a width of 1 to 1.6 mm (0.039 to 0.063 in) and are trigonous to triquetrous.

== Distribution and habitat ==
It is found in tropical parts of central Africa in Tanzania, Uganda, Zaïre and Kenya where it is commonly situated in clearings in upper montane forest communities at elevations of 2,400 to 2,700 m (7,900 to 8,900 ft) where it is associated with bamboo and giant heath.

== Status ==
The species was listed as Near Threatened by the International Union for the Conservation of Nature in 2017. It has a severely fragmented population with a declining number of mature individuals over an area of 300 km^{2} (120 sq mi) in 10 to 12 locations.

== See also ==
- List of Cyperus species
