= Begonia sodiroi =

Conservation status
- Near Threatened (IUCN 3.1)

Scientific classification
- Kingdom: Plantae
- Clade: Tracheophytes
- Clade: Angiosperms
- Clade: Eudicots
- Clade: Rosids
- Order: Cucurbitales
- Family: Begoniaceae
- Genus: Begonia
- Species: B. sodiroi

Binomial name
- Begonia sodiroi C.DC.

Species of flowering plant

Begonia sodiroi is a species of plant in the family Begoniaceae. It is endemic to Ecuador. Its natural habitats are subtropical or tropical moist lowland forests, subtropical or tropical moist montane forests, and subtropical or tropical high-altitude shrubland. It is threatened by habitat loss.
