= Carex tricephala =

Scientific classification
- Kingdom: Plantae
- Clade: Tracheophytes
- Clade: Angiosperms
- Clade: Monocots
- Clade: Commelinids
- Order: Poales
- Family: Cyperaceae
- Genus: Carex
- Species: C. tricephala

Binomial name
- Carex tricephala Boeckeler

Species of grass-like plant

Carex tricephala is a species in the genus Carex, family Cyperaceae. It is one of only about seven species in Carex sect. Scabrellae. Members of this section have leaf-like bracts, and small spicate inflorescences. Carex tricephala is native to Southeast Asia, reported from Cambodia, Indonesia, Laos, Myanmar, Thailand, Vietnam and the Chinese province of Yunnan.
