= Quercus jenseniana =

Conservation status
- Near Threatened (IUCN 3.1)

Scientific classification
- Kingdom: Plantae
- Clade: Embryophytes
- Clade: Tracheophytes
- Clade: Spermatophytes
- Clade: Angiosperms
- Clade: Eudicots
- Clade: Rosids
- Order: Fagales
- Family: Fagaceae
- Genus: Quercus
- Subgenus: Quercus subg. Cerris
- Section: Quercus sect. Cyclobalanopsis
- Species: Q. jenseniana

Binomial name
- Quercus jenseniana Hand.-Mazz. 1877

Synonyms
- Cyclobalanopsis jenseniana (Hand.-Mazz.) W.C. Cheng & T. Hong ex Q.F. Zheng; Cyclobalanopsis jensenianum (Hand.-Mazz.) W.T.Chun & T.Hong ex Q.F.Zheng; Lithocarpus dunnii F.P.Metcalf; Lithocarpus jensenianus (Hand.-Mazz.) Chun & Metcalf; Quercus pinbianense (Y.C. Hsu & H.Wei Jen) C.C. Huang & Y.T. Chang

Species of tree

Quercus jenseniana is an Asian species of trees in the beech family Fagaceae. It is native to southern China, found in the Provinces of Fujian, Guangdong, Guangxi, Guizhou, Hubei, Hunan, Jiangxi, Yunnan, and Zhejiang. It is placed in subgenus Cerris, section Cyclobalanopsis.

Quercus jenseniana is a large tree up to 35 meters tall. Leaves can be as much as 30 cm long.
