= Quercus sumatrana =

Conservation status
- Near Threatened (IUCN 3.1)

Scientific classification
- Kingdom: Plantae
- Clade: Embryophytes
- Clade: Tracheophytes
- Clade: Spermatophytes
- Clade: Angiosperms
- Clade: Eudicots
- Clade: Rosids
- Order: Fagales
- Family: Fagaceae
- Genus: Quercus
- Subgenus: Quercus subg. Cerris
- Section: Quercus sect. Cyclobalanopsis
- Species: Q. sumatrana

Binomial name
- Quercus sumatrana Soepadmo

Species of oak tree

Quercus sumatrana is an oak native to the islands of Sumatra and Borneo in Indonesia and Malaysia. On Borneo, it is reported from Sarawak, Sabah and East Kalimantan. This is a very large emergent tree up to 60 m (200 ft) tall, growing in mixed dipterocarp forest up to 1,400 m (4,600 ft) elevation. It is placed in subgenus Cerris, section Cyclobalanopsis.
