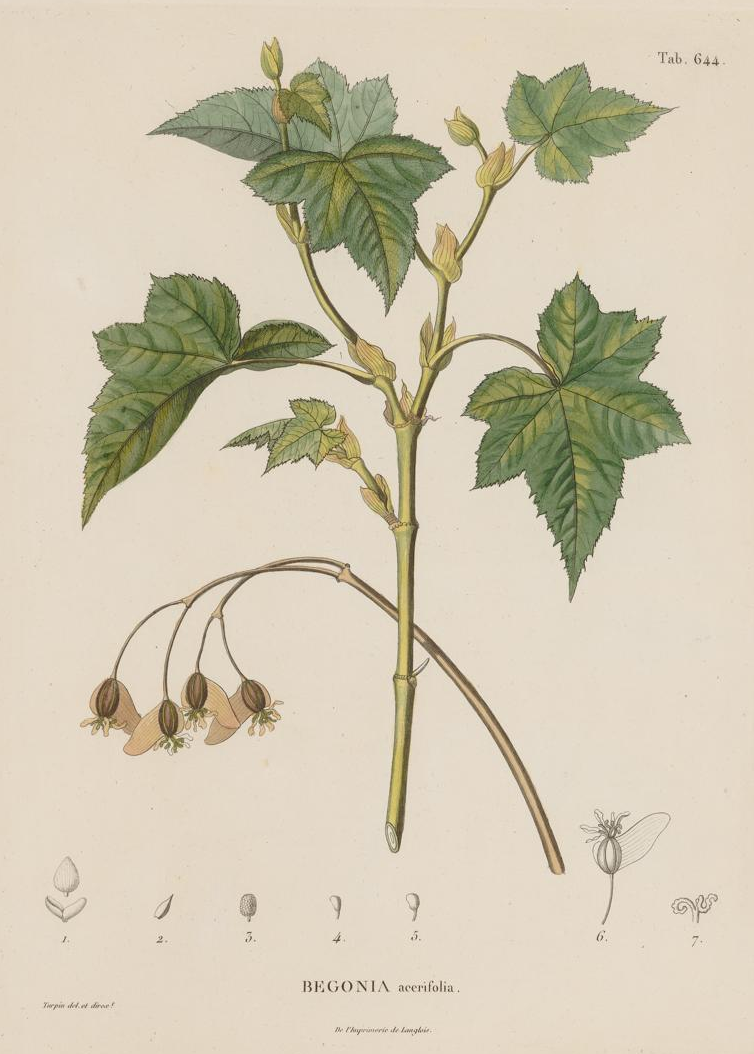

Conservation status
- Near Threatened (IUCN 3.1)

Scientific classification
- Kingdom: Plantae
- Clade: Tracheophytes
- Clade: Angiosperms
- Clade: Eudicots
- Clade: Rosids
- Order: Cucurbitales
- Family: Begoniaceae
- Genus: Begonia
- Species: B. acerifolia

Binomial name
- Begonia acerifolia Kunth

Synonyms
- List: Begonia dolabrifera C.DC.; Begonia erythrocarpa A.DC.; Begonia griseocaulis Irmsch.; Begonia lobatopeltata Irmsch.; Begonia macbrideana Irmsch.; Begonia pennellii L.B.Sm. & B.G.Schub.; Begonia pennellii subsp. lobato-ovata Irmsch.; Begonia pennellii var. longiloba Irmsch.; Begonia pennellii f. macrantha Irmsch.; Begonia triramosa Irmsch.; Begonia xerophyta L.B.Sm. & Wassh.

= Begonia acerifolia =

Species of flowering plant

Begonia acerifolia is a species of plant in the family Begoniaceae. It is native to Ecuador, Peru and Bolivia. Its natural habitats are subtropical or tropical moist montane forests and subtropical or tropical dry shrubland. It is threatened by habitat loss. The species was first described in 1825.
