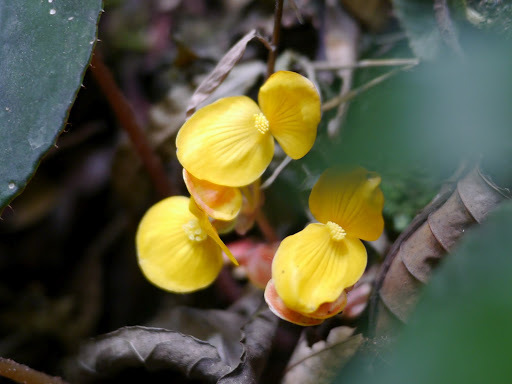

Conservation status
- Near Threatened (IUCN 3.1)

Scientific classification
- Kingdom: Plantae
- Clade: Embryophytes
- Clade: Tracheophytes
- Clade: Spermatophytes
- Clade: Angiosperms
- Clade: Eudicots
- Clade: Rosids
- Order: Cucurbitales
- Family: Begoniaceae
- Genus: Begonia
- Species: B. schaeferi

Binomial name
- Begonia schaeferi Engl.

= Begonia schaeferi =

Species of flowering plant

Begonia schaeferi is a species of plant in the family Begoniaceae. It is found in Cameroon and Nigeria. Its natural habitats are subtropical or tropical moist montane forests and rocky areas. It is threatened by habitat loss.
