= Pyrus oxyprion =

Conservation status
- Near Threatened (IUCN 2.3)

Scientific classification
- Kingdom: Plantae
- Clade: Tracheophytes
- Clade: Angiosperms
- Clade: Eudicots
- Clade: Rosids
- Order: Rosales
- Family: Rosaceae
- Genus: Pyrus
- Species: P. oxyprion

Binomial name
- Pyrus oxyprion Woronow

Species of pear tree

Pyrus oxyprion is a species of pear in the family Rosaceae that is native to the mountainous regions of Armenia, Turkey, Georgia and Iran. This deciduous shrub or small tree grows 3–5 metres tall with an irregular, spreading form, featuring grey-brown branches with stout spines and dark brown, densely leafy young shoots. It bears narrow, elliptical leaves with sharp-toothed margins, white five-petalled flowers arranged in clusters of 7–12 blooms, and produces somewhat pear-shaped, green-yellow fruits about 3 centimetres in diameter when ripe. The species grows on dry, rocky slopes and in open thickets between 600 and 1700 metres above sea level, preferring well-drained soils and full sun, and is currently classified as a near-threatened species on the IUCN Red List.

== Description ==
Pyrus oxyprion is a deciduous shrub or small tree, typically 3–5 m tall, with an irregular, often spreading crown. Older branches are grey‑brown and armed with stout spines; young branchlets are dark brown and densely leafy. Buds are broadly ovoid, about 5 by 4 mm, and covered in a dense, short woolly hair (tomentum). Leaves are narrow, shaped from oblanceolate to long‑elliptic (broadest above the middle), 3–8 by 0.7–2.0 cm; they have an acute tip and taper gradually to the base, with irregularly sharp teeth along the margin. The upper surface of the leaf is smooth and glossy, while the lower surface bears scattered hairs that soon wear away. Flower clusters (corymbs) comprise 7–12 white, five‑petalled flowers, each about 2 cm across; individual flowers have a short stalk (pedicel) 2.0–2.5 cm long, and a cup‑shaped hypanthium densely covered in hairs. There are typically five styles and 15–21 stamens arranged in two rings. Fruit is a subpyriform (somewhat pear‑shaped) pome about 3 cm in diameter, green‑yellow when ripe, with numerous gritty cells and persistent sepals appressed to its surface.

== Habitat and distribution ==
This species occurs on dry, rocky slopes and open thickets in montane areas of Armenia, north‑eastern Turkey and north‑western Iran, from about 600 m up to 1700 m above sea level. It often grows with other scrub species and under light woodland cover, favouring well‑drained soils and full sun.

The IUCN Red List suggests that it is endemic to Turkey; however, the species is listed as present in Georgia, Armenia, Nakhchivan, and Kermanshah Province, Iran.

== Taxonomy ==
Pyrus oxyprion was first validly published by Woronow in 1916 (as cited by Maleev 1971). It has sometimes been treated as a variety of Pyrus syriaca owing to similarities in leaf and fruit characters, but most modern authorities recognise it as a distinct species based on its narrowly oblanceolate, coarsely serrate leaves with attenuate bases and its characteristic subpyriform fruit. Specimens referred to this species have been collected in the province of Kars (now in Turkey) and verified in herbaria across the Caucasus region.

A phylogenetic study places it as most closely related to P. sosnovskyi (Fed.) and P. georgica (Kuth.).
