= Pitcairnia sodiroi =

Conservation status
- Near Threatened (IUCN 3.1)

Scientific classification
- Kingdom: Plantae
- Clade: Tracheophytes
- Clade: Angiosperms
- Clade: Monocots
- Clade: Commelinids
- Order: Poales
- Family: Bromeliaceae
- Genus: Pitcairnia
- Species: P. sodiroi

Binomial name
- Pitcairnia sodiroi Mez

Species of flowering plant

Pitcairnia sodiroi is a species of plant in the family Bromeliaceae, it is a perennial and epiphyte. It is endemic to Ecuador. Its natural habitat is subtropical or tropical moist montane forests. It is threatened by habitat loss.

The specific epithet of sodiroi refers to Luis Sodiro (1836–1909), who was an Italian Jesuit priest and a field botanist, who collected many plants in Ecuador.

It was first published in Bull. Herb. Boissier, sér. 2, vol.4 on page 622 in 1904.
