= Solanum hypocalycosarcum =

Conservation status
- Near Threatened (IUCN 3.1)

Scientific classification
- Kingdom: Plantae
- Clade: Tracheophytes
- Clade: Angiosperms
- Clade: Eudicots
- Clade: Asterids
- Order: Solanales
- Family: Solanaceae
- Genus: Solanum
- Species: S. hypocalycosarcum

Binomial name
- Solanum hypocalycosarcum Bitter

Species of flowering plant

Solanum hypocalycosarcum is a species of plant in the family Solanaceae. It is endemic to Ecuador.
