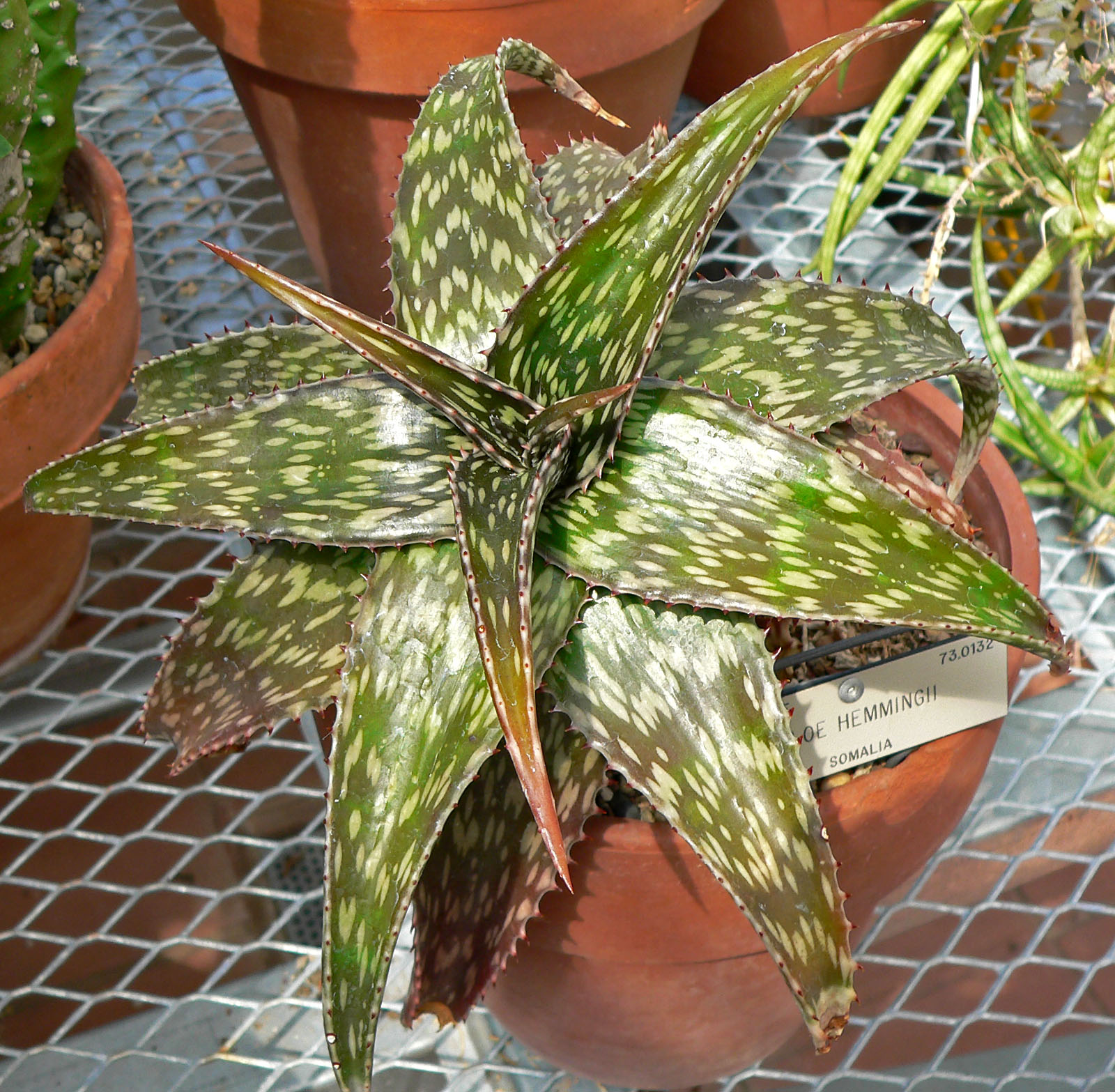

Conservation status
- Near Threatened (IUCN 3.1)
- CITES Appendix II (CITES)

Scientific classification
- Kingdom: Plantae
- Clade: Tracheophytes
- Clade: Angiosperms
- Clade: Monocots
- Order: Asparagales
- Family: Asphodelaceae
- Subfamily: Asphodeloideae
- Genus: Aloe
- Species: A. hemmingii

Binomial name
- Aloe hemmingii Reynolds & P.R.O.Bally

= Aloe hemmingii =

Species of succulent

Aloe hemmingii is a species of Aloe found in Somalia.
