= List of Ilex species =

The following species and natural hybrids in the flowering plant genus Ilex, the hollies, are accepted by Plants of the World Online. Ilex has the most species of any woody dioecious angiosperm genus.

== A ==
- Ilex abscondita Steyerm.
- Ilex aculeolata Nakai
- Ilex acutidenticulata Steyerm.
- Ilex affinis Gardner
- Ilex aggregata (Ruiz & Pav.) Loes.
- Ilex alternifolia (Zoll. & Moritzi) Loes.
- Ilex altiplana Steyerm.
- Ilex amazonensis Edwin
- Ilex ambigua (Michx.) Torr.
- Ilex amelanchier M.A.Curtis ex Chapm.
- Ilex amplifolia Rusby
- Ilex amygdalina Reissek ex Loes.
- Ilex andicola Loes.
- Ilex angulata Merr. & Chun
- Ilex angustissima Reissek
- Ilex annamensis Tardieu
- Ilex anodonta Standl. & Steyerm.
- Ilex anomala Hook. & Arn.
- Ilex anonoides Loes.
- Ilex antonii Elmer
- Ilex apicidens N.E.Br.
- Ilex apiensis S.Andrews
- Ilex aquifolium L.
- Ilex aracamuniana Steyerm.
- Ilex archeri Edwin
- Ilex ardisiifrons Reissek
- Ilex argentina Lillo
- Ilex arimensis (Loes.) Britton ex R.O.Williams
- Ilex arisanensis Yamam.
- Ilex arnhemensis (F.Muell.) Loes.
- Ilex asperula Mart. ex Reissek
- Ilex asprella Champ. ex Benth.
- Ilex atabapoensis T.R.Dudley
- Ilex atrata W.W.Sm.
- Ilex × attenuata Ashe
- Ilex auricula S.Andrews
- Ilex austrosinensis C.J.Tseng
- Ilex azuensis Loes.

== B ==
- Ilex baasiana B.C.Stone & Kiew
- Ilex bahiahondica (Loes.) P.A.González
- Ilex barahonica Loes.
- Ilex belizensis Lundell
- Ilex berteroi Loes.
- Ilex bidens C.Y.Wu ex Y.R.Li
- Ilex bidoupensis Yahara & Tagane
- Ilex bioritsensis Hayata
- Ilex biserrulata Loes.
- Ilex blancheana Judd
- Ilex blanchetii Loes.
- Ilex boliviana Britton
- Ilex brachyphylla (Hand.-Mazz.) S.Y.Hu
- Ilex brandegeeana Loes.
- Ilex brasiliensis (Spreng.) Loes.
- Ilex brevicuspis Reissek
- Ilex brevipedicellata Steyerm.
- Ilex buergeri Miq.
- Ilex bullata Cuatrec.
- Ilex buxifolia Gardner
- Ilex buxoides S.Y.Hu

== C ==
- Ilex calcicola W.B.Liao & K.W.Xu
- Ilex canariensis Poir.
- Ilex cardonae Steyerm.
- Ilex casiquiarensis Loes.
- Ilex cassine L.
- Ilex cauliflora H.W.Li ex Y.R.Li
- Ilex celebensis Capit.
- Ilex centrochinensis S.Y.Hu
- Ilex cerasifolia Reissek
- Ilex chamaebuxus C.Y.Wu ex Y.R.Li
- Ilex chamaedryfolia Reissek
- Ilex championii Loes.
- Ilex chapaensis Merr.
- Ilex chengbuensis C.J.Qi & Q.Z.Lin
- Ilex chengkouensis C.J.Tseng
- Ilex cheniana T.R.Dudley
- Ilex chevalieri Tardieu
- Ilex chinensis Sims
- Ilex chingiana Hu & Tang
- Ilex chiriquensis Standl.
- Ilex chuguangii M.M.Lin
- Ilex chuniana S.Y.Hu
- Ilex ciliolata Steyerm.
- Ilex cinerea Champ. ex Benth.
- Ilex clementis Britton & P.Wilson
- Ilex clethriflora S.Andrews
- Ilex cochinchinensis (Lour.) Loes.
- Ilex cognata Reissek
- Ilex colchica Pojark.
- Ilex collina Alexander
- Ilex colombiana Cuatrec.
- Ilex condensata Turcz.
- Ilex condorensis Pierre
- Ilex confertiflora Merr.
- Ilex congesta Reissek
- Ilex conocarpa Reissek
- Ilex cookii Britton & P.Wilson
- Ilex corallina Franch.
- Ilex coriacea (Pursh) Chapm.
- Ilex cornuta Lindl. & Paxton
- Ilex costaricensis Donn.Sm.
- Ilex costata Edwin
- Ilex cowanii Wurdack
- Ilex crassifolioides Loes.
- Ilex crenata Thunb.
- Ilex cubana Loes.
- Ilex cuiabensis Reissek
- Ilex culmenicola Steyerm.
- Ilex curranii Merr.
- Ilex cuthbertii Small
- Ilex cuzcoana Loes.
- Ilex cymosa Blume
- Ilex cyrtura Merr.

== D ==
- Ilex dabieshanensis K.Yao & M.B.Deng
- Ilex danielis Killip & Cuatrec.
- Ilex daphnogenea Reissek
- Ilex dasyclada C.Y.Wu ex Y.R.Li
- Ilex dasyphylla Merr.
- Ilex davidsei Steyerm.
- Ilex decidua Walter
- Ilex dehongensis S.K.Chen & Y.X.Feng
- Ilex delavayi Franch.
- Ilex densifolia Miq.
- Ilex denticulata Wall. ex Wight
- Ilex depressifructu Pruesapan & Welzen
- Ilex dianguiensis C.J.Tseng
- Ilex dicarpa Y.R.Li
- Ilex dictyoneura Loes.
- Ilex dimorphophylla Koidz.
- Ilex dioica (Vahl) Griseb.
- Ilex diospyroides Reissek
- Ilex dipyrena Wall.
- Ilex discolor Hemsl.
- Ilex diuretica Mart. ex Reissek
- Ilex divaricata Mart. ex Reissek
- Ilex dolichopoda Merr. & Chun
- Ilex duarteensis Loes.
- Ilex dugesii Fernald
- Ilex duidae Gleason
- Ilex dumosa Reissek

== E ==
- Ilex editicostata Hu & Tang
- Ilex elliptica Kunth
- Ilex elmerrilliana S.Y.Hu
- Ilex embelioides Hook.f.
- Ilex emmae D.M.Hicks
- Ilex englishii Lace
- Ilex eoa Alain
- Ilex ericoides Loes.
- Ilex estriata C.J.Tseng
- Ilex euryoides C.J.Tseng
- Ilex excavata Pierre
- Ilex excelsa (Wall.) Voigt

== F ==
- Ilex fanshawei Edwin
- Ilex farallonensis Cuatrec.
- Ilex fargesii Franch.
- Ilex fengqingensis C.Y.Wu ex Y.R.Li
- Ilex ferruginea Hand.-Mazz.
- Ilex ficifolia C.J.Tseng ex S.K.Chen & Y.X.Feng
- Ilex ficoidea Hemsl.
- Ilex floribunda Reissek ex Maxim.
- Ilex florifera Fawc. & Rendle
- Ilex flosparva Cuatrec.
- Ilex formosana Maxim.
- Ilex forrestii H.F.Comber
- Ilex fragilis Hook.f.
- Ilex friburgensis Loes.
- Ilex fruticosa S.Andrews
- Ilex fuertensiana (Loes.) T.R.Dudley
- Ilex fukienensis S.Y.Hu

== G ==
- Ilex gabinetensis Cuatrec.
- Ilex gabrielleana Loizeau & Spichiger
- Ilex gagnepainiana Tardieu
- Ilex gale Triana & Planch.
- Ilex gansuensis D.Y.Hong
- Ilex gardneriana Wight
- Ilex geniculata Maxim.
- Ilex georgei H.F.Comber
- Ilex glabella Steyerm.
- Ilex glabra (L.) A.Gray
- Ilex glaucophylla Steyerm.
- Ilex glazioviana Loes.
- Ilex gleasoniana Steyerm.
- Ilex glomerata King
- Ilex godajam Colebr. ex Hook.f.
- Ilex goshiensis Hayata
- Ilex gotardensis Loizeau & Spichiger
- Ilex goudotii Loes.
- Ilex graciliflora Champ. ex Benth.
- Ilex grandiflora Ridl.
- Ilex gransabanensis Steyerm.
- Ilex guaiquinimae Steyerm.
- Ilex guangnanensis C.J.Tseng & Y.R.Li
- Ilex guaramacalensis Cuello & Aymard
- Ilex guayusa Loes.
- Ilex guerreroii Merr. ex Elmer
- Ilex guianensis (Aubl.) Kuntze
- Ilex guizhouensis C.J.Tseng
- Ilex gundlachiana Loes.

== H ==
- Ilex haberi (Lundell) W.J.Hahn
- Ilex hahnii Doweld
- Ilex hainanensis Merr.
- Ilex hanceana Maxim.
- Ilex harmandiana Pierre
- Ilex harrisii Loes.
- Ilex havilandii Loes.
- Ilex hayatana Loes.
- Ilex hemiepiphytica W.J.Hahn
- Ilex hicksii I.M.Turner
- Ilex hippocrateoides Kunth
- Ilex hirsuta C.J.Tseng ex S.K.Chen & Y.X.Feng
- Ilex holstii Steyerm.
- Ilex honbaensis Tardieu
- Ilex hondurensis Standl.
- Ilex hongiaoensis Tagane
- Ilex hookeri King
- Ilex huachamacariana Edwin
- Ilex hualgayoca Loizeau & Spichiger
- Ilex huana C.J.Tseng ex S.K.Chen & Y.X.Feng
- Ilex huberi J.R.Grande
- Ilex hylonoma Hu & Tang
- Ilex hypaneura Loes.
- Ilex hypoglauca (Miq.) Loes.

== I ==
- Ilex ignicola Steyerm.
- Ilex ijuensis S.Andrews
- Ilex illustris Ridl.
- Ilex impressa Ekman & Loes.
- Ilex integerrima Reissek
- Ilex integra Thunb.
- Ilex intermedia Loes.
- Ilex intricata Hook.f.
- Ilex inundata Poepp. ex Reissek

== J ==
- Ilex jacobsii S.Andrews
- Ilex jamaicana Proctor
- Ilex jaramillana Cuatrec.
- Ilex jauaensis Steyerm.
- Ilex jelskii Zahlbr.
- Ilex jenmanii Loes.
- Ilex jiangmenensis Lei Jiang & K.W.Xu
- Ilex jiaolingensis C.J.Tseng & H.H.Liu
- Ilex jingxiensis Y.F.Huang & M.X.Lai
- Ilex jinyunensis Z.M.Tan
- Ilex jiuwanshanensis C.J.Tseng
- Ilex julianii Edwin
- Ilex juttana Loizeau & Spichiger

== K ==
- Ilex karstenii Loes.
- Ilex karuaiana Steyerm.
- Ilex kaushue S.Y.Hu
- Ilex kelabitana S.Andrews
- Ilex kelsallii Ridl.
- Ilex kengii S.Y.Hu
- Ilex keranjiensis S.Andrews
- Ilex ketambensis T.R.Dudley
- Ilex khasiana Purkay.
- Ilex kiangsiensis (S.Y.Hu) C.J.Tseng & B.W.Liu
- Ilex kinabaluensis S.Andrews
- Ilex kingiana Cockerell
- Ilex × kiusiana Hatus.
- Ilex knucklesensis Philcox
- Ilex kobuskiana S.Y.Hu
- Ilex krugiana Loes.
- Ilex kunmingensis H.W.Li ex Y.R.Li
- Ilex kunthiana Triana
- Ilex kusanoi Hayata
- Ilex kwangtungensis Merr.

== L ==
- Ilex laevigata A.Gray
- Ilex lamprophylla Standl.
- Ilex lancilimba Merr.
- Ilex lasseri Edwin
- Ilex latifolia Thunb.
- Ilex latifrons Chun
- Ilex laureola Triana
- Ilex laurina Kunth
- Ilex leucoclada (Maxim.) Makino
- Ilex liana S.Y.Hu
- Ilex liangii S.Y.Hu
- Ilex liebmannii Standl.
- Ilex liesneri Steyerm.
- Ilex lihuaiensis T.R.Dudley
- Ilex lilianeae Loizeau & Spichiger
- Ilex linii C.J.Tseng
- Ilex litseifolia Hu & Tang
- Ilex liukiuensis Loes.
- Ilex loeseneri Tardieu
- Ilex lohfauensis Merr.
- Ilex longecaudata H.F.Comber
- Ilex longipes Chapm. ex Trel.
- Ilex longipetiolata Loes.
- Ilex longipilosa Steyerm.
- Ilex longzhouensis C.J.Tseng
- Ilex lonicerifolia Hayata
- Ilex loranthoides Mart. ex Reissek
- Ilex loretoica Loes.
- Ilex ludianensis S.C.Huang ex Y.R.Li
- Ilex lundii Warm.

== M ==
- Ilex maasiana Loizeau & Spichiger
- Ilex macarenensis Cuatrec.
- Ilex macbridiana Edwin
- Ilex macfadyenii (Walp.) Rehder
- Ilex machilifolia H.W.Li ex Y.R.Li
- Ilex maclurei Merr.
- Ilex macrocarpa Oliv.
- Ilex macropoda Miq.
- Ilex macrostigma C.Y.Wu ex Y.R.Li
- Ilex magnifolia Cuatrec.
- Ilex magnifructa Edwin
- Ilex maguirei Wurdack
- Ilex maigualidensis J.R.Grande
- Ilex maingayi Hook.f.
- Ilex × makinoi H.Hara
- Ilex malabarica Bedd.
- Ilex malaccensis Loes.
- Ilex mandonii Loes.
- Ilex manitzii P.A.González
- Ilex manneiensis S.Y.Hu
- Ilex marahuacae Steyerm.
- Ilex marginata Edwin
- Ilex martiniana D.Don
- Ilex matanoana Makino
- Ilex maxima W.J.Hahn
- Ilex maximowicziana Loes.
- Ilex medogensis Y.R.Li
- Ilex megalophylla Edwin ex T.R.Dudley
- Ilex megaphylla S.Andrews
- Ilex melanophylla H.T.Chang
- Ilex memecylifolia Champ. ex Benth.
- Ilex mertensii Maxim.
- Ilex mesilauensis S.Andrews
- Ilex metabaptista Loes.
- Ilex micrantha Triana & Planch.
- Ilex micrococca Maxim.
- Ilex microdonta Reissek
- Ilex microphylla Hook.
- Ilex microsticta Loes.
- Ilex microwrightioides Loes.
- Ilex miguensis S.Y.Hu
- Ilex mitis (L.) Radlk.
- Ilex montana Torr. & A.Gray
- Ilex montebellensis Lozada-Pérez
- Ilex mucronata (L.) M.Powell, Savol. & S.Andrews
- Ilex mucronulata Cuatrec.
- Ilex mucugensis Groppo
- Ilex myricoides Kunth
- Ilex myrtifolia Walter
- Ilex myrtillus Ridl.

== N ==
- Ilex nanchuanensis Z.M.Tan
- Ilex nanningensis Hand.-Mazz.
- Ilex nayana Cuatrec.
- Ilex neblinensis Edwin
- Ilex nemorosa Rizzini
- Ilex neocaledonica Maxim.
- Ilex neomamillata I.M.Turner
- Ilex neoreticulata I.M.Turner
- Ilex nervosa Triana
- Ilex nervulosa (Loes.) S.Andrews
- Ilex nigropunctata Miers
- Ilex ningdeensis C.J.Tseng
- Ilex nipponica Makino
- Ilex nitida (Vahl) Maxim.
- Ilex nitidissima C.J.Tseng
- Ilex nothofagifolia Kingdon-Ward
- Ilex nothophoeboides I.M.Turner
- Ilex nubicola C.Y.Wu ex Y.R.Li
- Ilex nuculicava S.Y.Hu
- Ilex nummularia Reissek

== O ==
- Ilex obcordata Sw.
- Ilex oblonga C.J.Tseng
- Ilex obtusata Triana & Planch.
- Ilex occulta C.J.Tseng
- Ilex odorata Buch.-Ham. ex D.Don
- Ilex oligodonta Merr. & Chun
- Ilex oligoneura Loes.
- Ilex oliveriana Loes.
- Ilex omeiensis Hu & Tang
- Ilex opaca Aiton
- Ilex organensis Loes.
- Ilex ovalifolia G.Mey.
- Ilex ovalis (Ruiz & Pav.) Loes.
- Ilex × owariensis Hatus. & M.Kobay.

== P ==
- Ilex pachyphylla Merr.
- Ilex pallida Standl.
- Ilex paltorioides Reissek
- Ilex paraguariensis A.St.-Hil.
- Ilex paruensis Steyerm.
- Ilex parvifructa Edwin
- Ilex patens Ridl.
- Ilex pauciflora Ridl.
- Ilex paucinervia Merr.
- Ilex paujiensis Steyerm.
- Ilex pedunculosa Miq.
- Ilex peiradena S.Y.Hu
- Ilex pentagona S.K.Chen, Y.X.Feng & C.F.Liang
- Ilex perado Aiton
- Ilex perlata C.Chen & S.C.Huang ex Y.R.Li
- Ilex permicrophylla Merr.
- Ilex pernervata Cuatrec.
- Ilex pernyi Franch.
- Ilex perryana S.Y.Hu
- Ilex petiolaris Benth.
- Ilex phanganensis Pruesapan & Welzen
- Ilex phillyreifolia Reissek
- Ilex pingheensis C.J.Tseng
- Ilex pingnanensis S.Y.Hu
- Ilex poiensis S.Andrews
- Ilex poilanei Tardieu
- Ilex polita Steyerm.
- Ilex polypyrena C.J.Tseng & B.W.Liu
- Ilex praetermissa Kiew
- Ilex pringlei Standl.
- Ilex promecophylla S.Andrews
- Ilex prostrata Groppo
- Ilex psammophila Mart. ex Reissek
- Ilex pseudobuxus Reissek
- Ilex pseudoebenacea Loes.
- Ilex pseudomachilifolia C.Y.Wu ex Y.R.Li
- Ilex pseudo-odorata Loes.
- Ilex pseudothea Reissek
- Ilex pseudotheezans Loes.
- Ilex pseudoumbelliformis T.R.Dudley
- Ilex pseudovaccinium Reissek ex Maxim.
- Ilex ptariana Steyerm.
- Ilex pubescens Hook. & Arn.
- Ilex pubifructa Pruesapan, S.Andrews & D.A.Simpson
- Ilex pubigera (C.Y.Wu ex Y.R.Li) S.K.Chen & Y.X.Feng
- Ilex pubilimba Merr. & Chun
- Ilex pustulosa Triana & Planch.
- Ilex pyrifolia C.J.Tseng

== Q ==
- Ilex qianlingshanensis C.J.Tseng
- Ilex qingyuanensis C.Z.Zheng
- Ilex quercetorum I.M.Johnst.
- Ilex quitensis (Humb. & Bonpl. ex Schult.) Loes.

== R ==
- Ilex ramonensis Standl.
- Ilex rarasanensis Sasaki
- Ilex renae S.Andrews
- Ilex retusa Klotzsch ex Reissek
- Ilex retusifolia S.Y.Hu
- Ilex revoluta Stapf
- Ilex rimbachii Standl.
- Ilex robusta C.J.Tseng
- Ilex robustinervosa C.J.Tseng ex S.K.Chen & Y.X.Feng
- Ilex rotunda Thunb.
- Ilex rubra S.Watson
- Ilex rubrinervia Tardieu
- Ilex rugosa F.Schmidt
- Ilex rupicola Kunth

== S ==
- Ilex salicina Hand.-Mazz.
- Ilex sanqingshanensis W.B.Liao, Q.Fan & S.Shi
- Ilex sapiiformis Reissek
- Ilex sapotifolia Reissek
- Ilex savannarum Wurdack
- Ilex saxicola C.J.Tseng & H.H.Liu
- Ilex schwackeana Loes.
- Ilex sclerophylla Hook.f.
- Ilex sclerophylloides Loes.
- Ilex scopulorum Kunth
- Ilex scutiiformis Reissek
- Ilex sebertii Pancher
- Ilex serrata Thunb.
- Ilex servinii E.Carranza
- Ilex sessiliflora Triana & Planch.
- Ilex sessilifructa Edwin
- Ilex shennongjiaensis T.R.Dudley & S.C.Sun
- Ilex shimeica K.F.Kwok
- Ilex shukunii Y.Yang & H.Peng
- Ilex shweliensis H.F.Comber
- Ilex sideroxyloides (Sw.) Griseb.
- Ilex sikkimensis Kurz
- Ilex sinica (Loes.) S.Y.Hu
- Ilex sipapoana Edwin
- Ilex socorroensis Brandegee
- Ilex soderstromii Edwin
- Ilex solida Edwin
- Ilex spicata Blume
- Ilex spinigera (Loes.) Loes.
- Ilex spinulosa Cuatrec.
- Ilex spruceana Reissek
- Ilex stellata W.J.Hahn
- Ilex stenocarpa Pojark.
- Ilex stenura (Merr. & L.M.Perry) D.M.Hicks
- Ilex sterrophylla Merr. & Chun
- Ilex stewardii S.Y.Hu
- Ilex steyermarkii Edwin
- Ilex strigillosa T.R.Dudley
- Ilex suaveolens (H.Lév.) Loes.
- Ilex subcaudata Merr. ex Elmer
- Ilex subcordata Reissek
- Ilex subcrenata S.Y.Hu
- Ilex suber Loes.
- Ilex subficoidea S.Y.Hu
- Ilex sublongecaudata C.J.Tseng & S.Liu ex Y.R.Li
- Ilex subodorata S.Y.Hu
- Ilex subrotundifolia Steyerm.
- Ilex subrugosa Loes.
- Ilex subtriflora Griseb. ex Loes.
- Ilex sugerokii Maxim.
- Ilex suichangensis C.Z.Zheng
- Ilex summa Steyerm.
- Ilex suprema Cuatrec.
- Ilex suzukii S.Y.Hu
- Ilex synpyrena C.J.Tseng
- Ilex syzygiophylla C.J.Tseng ex S.K.Chen & Y.X.Feng
- Ilex szechwanensis Loes.

== T ==
- Ilex tadiandamolensis Kesh.Murthy, Yogan. & Vasud.Nair
- Ilex tahanensis Kiew
- Ilex tamii T.R.Dudley
- Ilex tarapotina Loes.
- Ilex tateana Steyerm.
- Ilex taubertiana Loes.
- Ilex tectonica W.J.Hahn
- Ilex tenuis C.J.Tseng
- Ilex tepuiana Steyerm. ex Edwin
- Ilex teratopis Loes.
- Ilex tetramera (Rehder) C.J.Tseng
- Ilex theezans Mart.
- Ilex thyrsiflora Klotzsch ex Reissek
- Ilex tiricae Edwin
- Ilex tonii Lundell
- Ilex tonkinensis Pierre
- Ilex toroidea D.M.Hicks
- Ilex trachyphylla Loes.
- Ilex trichocarpa H.W.Li ex Y.R.Li
- Ilex trichoclada Loes.
- Ilex trichothyrsa Loes.
- Ilex triflora Blume
- Ilex truxillensis Turcz.
- Ilex tsangii S.Y.Hu
- Ilex tsiangiana C.J.Tseng
- Ilex tsoi Merr. & Chun
- Ilex tugitakayamensis Sasaki
- Ilex tutcheri Merr.

== U ==
- Ilex uaramae Edwin
- Ilex uleana Loes.
- Ilex umbellata Klotzsch ex Reissek
- Ilex umbellulata (Wall.) Loes.
- Ilex uniflora Benth.
- Ilex uraiensis Yamam.
- Ilex urbaniana Loes.
- Ilex urceolatus C.B.Shang, K.S.Tang & D.Q.Du

== V ==
- Ilex vacciniifolia Klotzsch ex Reissek
- Ilex valenzuelana Alain
- Ilex velutina Mart. ex Reissek
- Ilex velutinulosa Cuatrec.
- Ilex venezuelensis Steyerm.
- Ilex venulosa Hook.f.
- Ilex venusta H.Peng & W.B.Liao
- Ilex verisimilis C.J.Tseng ex S.K.Chen & Y.X.Feng
- Ilex verticillata (L.) A.Gray
- Ilex vesparum Steyerm.
- Ilex victorinii Alain
- Ilex vietnamensis T.R.Dudley
- Ilex villosula Loes.
- Ilex virgata Loes.
- Ilex viridis Champ. ex Benth.
- Ilex vismiifolia Reissek
- Ilex vitiensis A.Gray
- Ilex volkensiana (Loes.) Kaneh. & Hatus.
- Ilex vomitoria Aiton
- Ilex vulcanicola Standl.

== W ==
- Ilex walkeri Wight & Gardner ex Thwaites
- Ilex wallichii Hook.f.
- Ilex walsinghamii R.A.Howard
- Ilex × wandoensis C.F.Mill. & M.Kim
- Ilex warburgii Loes.
- Ilex wattii Loes.
- Ilex weberlingii Loizeau & Spichiger
- Ilex wenchowensis S.Y.Hu
- Ilex wenzelii Merr.
- Ilex wightiana Wall. ex Wight
- Ilex williamsii Standl.
- Ilex wilsonii Loes.
- Ilex wugongshanensis C.J.Tseng ex S.K.Chen & Y.X.Feng
- Ilex wuiana T.R.Dudley
- Ilex wurdackiana Steyerm.

== X ==
- Ilex xiaojinensis Y.Q.Wang & P.Y.Chen

== Y ==
- Ilex yangchunensis C.J.Tseng
- Ilex yunnanensis Franch.
- Ilex yurumanguinis Cuatrec.
- Ilex yutajensis Wurdack

== Z ==
- Ilex zeylanica (Hook.f.) Maxim.
- Ilex zhejiangensis C.J.Tseng ex S.K.Chen & Y.X.Feng

== Artificial hybrids ==
Some artificial hybrids are also known, including:

- Ilex × altaclerensis (Loudon) Dallim. – I. aquifolium × I. perado
- Ilex × koehneana Loes. – I. aquifolium × I. latifolia
