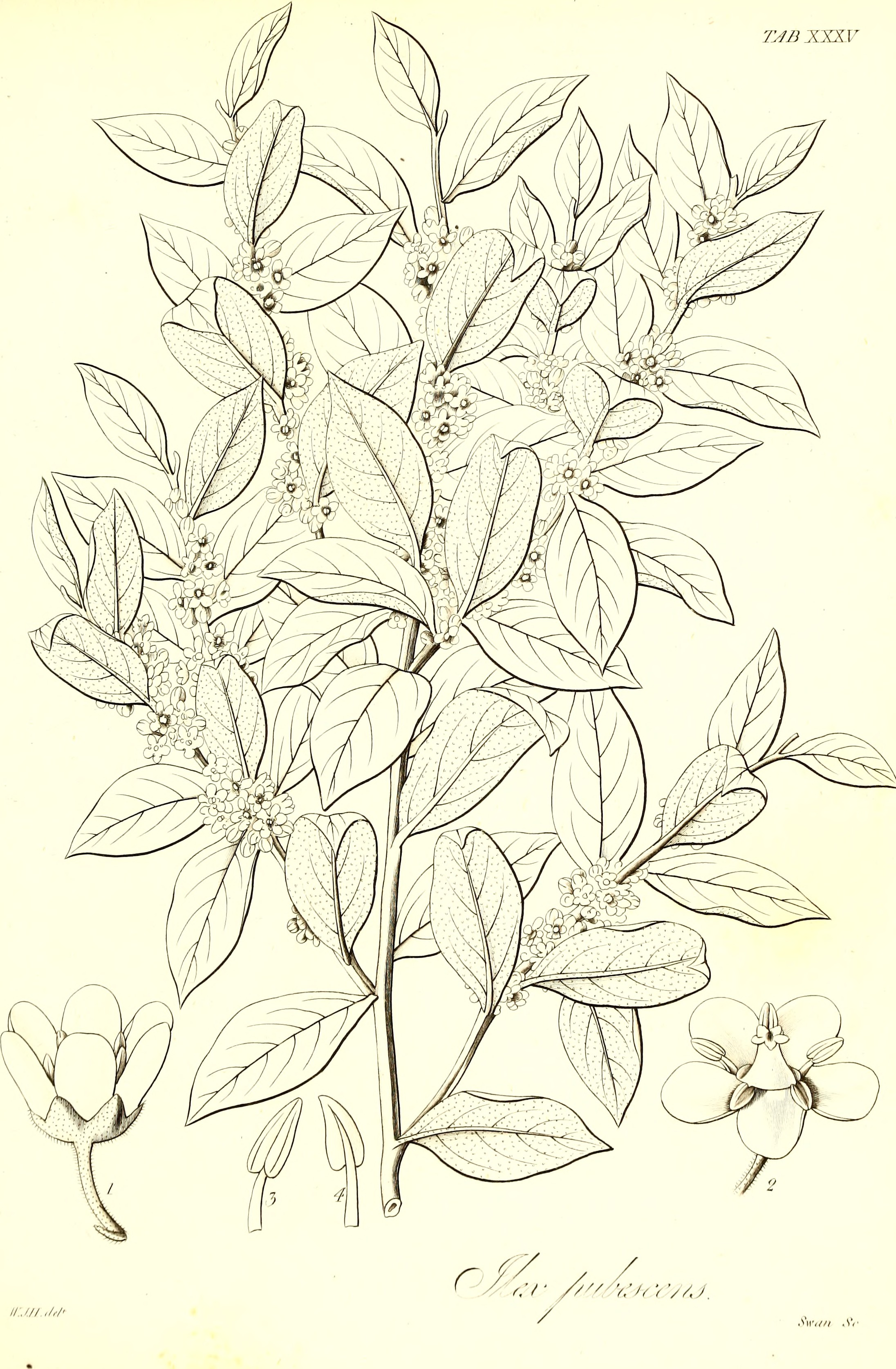
- Botanical illustration

Scientific classification
- Kingdom: Plantae
- Clade: Tracheophytes
- Clade: Angiosperms
- Clade: Eudicots
- Clade: Asterids
- Order: Aquifoliales
- Family: Aquifoliaceae
- Genus: Ilex
- Species: I. pubescens

Binomial name
- Ilex pubescens Hook. & Arn.

Synonyms
- Ilex pubescens var. glabra H.T.Chang; Ilex trichoclada Hayata

= Ilex pubescens =

Species of plant

Ilex pubescens, the downy holly or pubescent holly, is a species of flowering plant in the family Aquifoliaceae, native to southern China, Hainan, and Taiwan. A shrub or small tree, it is found in a variety of habitats from sea level to about 1,000 m (3,300 ft). It is widely used in traditional Chinese medicine for a variety of ailments.

== Subtaxa ==
The following varieties are accepted:

- Ilex pubescens var. kwangsiensis Hand.-Mazz. – mainland China
- Ilex pubescens var. pubescens – entire range
