= Ilex marginata =

Conservation status
- Near Threatened (IUCN 2.3)

Scientific classification
- Kingdom: Plantae
- Clade: Tracheophytes
- Clade: Angiosperms
- Clade: Eudicots
- Clade: Asterids
- Order: Aquifoliales
- Family: Aquifoliaceae
- Genus: Ilex
- Species: I. marginata

Binomial name
- Ilex marginata Edwin

Species of holly

Ilex marginata is a species of plant in the family Aquifoliaceae. It is endemic to Venezuela. Otherwise known as the variegated English Holly. The female Ilex Marginata produces inedible small berries. The plant is popular for decoration along the midline of the United States where the climate seems to agree with the plant better. The Ilex marginata produces small white flowers. The hedge shape of the plant and its color scheme makes it a popular holiday decoration.
