= Ilex stenura =

Conservation status
- Vulnerable (IUCN 2.3)

Scientific classification
- Kingdom: Plantae
- Clade: Tracheophytes
- Clade: Angiosperms
- Clade: Eudicots
- Clade: Asterids
- Order: Aquifoliales
- Family: Aquifoliaceae
- Genus: Ilex
- Species: I. stenura

Binomial name
- Ilex stenura (Merr. & L. M. Perry) D. M. Hicks

Species of holly

Ilex stenura is a species of small tree in the family Aquifoliaceae. It is endemic to New Guinea, growing in subalpine areas up to 2500 metres above sea level.
