= Ilex tarapotina =

Conservation status
- Vulnerable (IUCN 3.1)

Scientific classification
- Kingdom: Plantae
- Clade: Tracheophytes
- Clade: Angiosperms
- Clade: Eudicots
- Clade: Asterids
- Order: Aquifoliales
- Family: Aquifoliaceae
- Genus: Ilex
- Species: I. tarapotina

Binomial name
- Ilex tarapotina Loes.

Species of plant

Ilex tarapotina is a species of flowering plant in the family, Aquifoliaceae. This holly is used in northern Peru to make a special type of maté known as "té o' maté" which is said to produce unknown effects.
