= Ilex jacobsii =

Conservation status
- Near Threatened (IUCN 3.1)

Scientific classification
- Kingdom: Plantae
- Clade: Tracheophytes
- Clade: Angiosperms
- Clade: Eudicots
- Clade: Asterids
- Order: Aquifoliales
- Family: Aquifoliaceae
- Genus: Ilex
- Species: I. jacobsii

Binomial name
- Ilex jacobsii S.Andrews

Species of plant in the holly family

Ilex jacobsii is a plant in the family Aquifoliaceae, native to Borneo. The specific epithet jacobsii is for the botanist Marius Jacobs.

== Description ==
Ilex jacobsii may grow as a tree up to 7 metres (23 ft) tall or as an epiphyte. Its leathery leaves are elliptic to oblong and measure up to 16.5 cm (6 in) long. The flowers are greenish to white.

== Distribution and habitat ==
Ilex jacobsii is endemic to Borneo, where it is confined to Sarawak and Brunei. Its habitat is lowland dipterocarp forests.

== Conservation ==
Ilex jacobsii has been assessed as near threatened on the IUCN Red List. While the species is currently mostly in protected areas, if these habitats were to lose protection then land conversion and logging could threaten the species.
