= Ilex brachyphylla =

Conservation status
- Endangered (IUCN 3.1)

Scientific classification
- Kingdom: Plantae
- Clade: Tracheophytes
- Clade: Angiosperms
- Clade: Eudicots
- Clade: Asterids
- Order: Aquifoliales
- Family: Aquifoliaceae
- Genus: Ilex
- Species: I. brachyphylla

Binomial name
- Ilex brachyphylla (Hand.-Mazz.)S.Y.Hu

Species of plant

Ilex brachyphylla is a type of holly - a species of plant in the family Aquifoliaceae. It is endemic to China where it grows as a shrub or small tree from 4 to 15 m (13 to 49 ft) in height. It has leathery glossy green leaves which have serrated edges and a sharp point. Although male flowers have been described, the Flora of China records that female flowers have not been observed and neither has the fruit. It is rare and an endangered species found only on mountain slopes in south-west Hunan province.
