= Ilex affinis =

Conservation status
- Least Concern (IUCN 3.1)

Scientific classification
- Kingdom: Plantae
- Clade: Tracheophytes
- Clade: Angiosperms
- Clade: Eudicots
- Clade: Asterids
- Order: Aquifoliales
- Family: Aquifoliaceae
- Genus: Ilex
- Species: I. affinis

Binomial name
- Ilex affinis Gardner (1824)

Species of hollu

Ilex affinis is an evergreen tree in the holly family.

It has a dense, elongate crown and can grow 4–8 metres (13–26 ft) tall. The straight, more or less cylindrical bole can be 30–45 cm (12–18 in) in diameter.

This small tree or shrub species occurs in Argentina, Bolivia, Brazil and Paraguay. It has an estimated extent of occurrence of 7,241,593 km2. It is used locally to make a tea, as a medicine and as a timber. The plant is classified as 'Least Concern' in the IUCN Red List of Threatened Species (2021).
