= Ilex hayatana =

Scientific classification
- Kingdom: Plantae
- Clade: Tracheophytes
- Clade: Angiosperms
- Clade: Eudicots
- Clade: Asterids
- Order: Aquifoliales
- Family: Aquifoliaceae
- Genus: Ilex
- Species: I. hayatana

Binomial name
- Ilex hayatana Loes.

Species of plant

Ilex hayatana is a species of flowering plant in the holly family, Aquifoliaceae. It is native to Taiwan. There is some confusion about the identity of this species; for example Flora of China states that it is an evergreen tree with "pale gray‑black" bark reaching 12 m (39 ft) tall, found in forests at 200 to 300 m (700 to 1,000 ft) a.s.l., and also native to Japan, but the International Dendrology Society states that the original specimen, which is still alive, lives at 1,900 m (6,200 ft) and was described as either an 18 m (59 ft) tree or a 4 m (13 ft) shrub.
