= Ilex subtriflora =

Conservation status
- Critically Endangered (IUCN 2.3)

Scientific classification
- Kingdom: Plantae
- Clade: Tracheophytes
- Clade: Angiosperms
- Clade: Eudicots
- Clade: Asterids
- Order: Aquifoliales
- Family: Aquifoliaceae
- Genus: Ilex
- Species: I. subtriflora

Binomial name
- Ilex subtriflora Griseb. ex Loes.

Species of holly

Ilex subtriflora is a species of flowering plant in the family Aquifoliaceae.

== Distribution ==
It is endemic to Jamaica.
