= Ilex hypoglauca =

Scientific classification
- Kingdom: Plantae
- Clade: Tracheophytes
- Clade: Angiosperms
- Clade: Eudicots
- Clade: Asterids
- Order: Aquifoliales
- Family: Aquifoliaceae
- Genus: Ilex
- Species: I. hypoglauca

Binomial name
- Ilex hypoglauca (Miq.) Loes.

Synonyms
- Prinos hypoglaucus Miq.; Ilex beccariana Loes.; Prinos lacunosa Miq.

Species of tree in the holly family

Ilex hypoglauca is a tree in the family Aquifoliaceae. The specific epithet hypoglauca means 'glaucous beneath' referring to the leaves.

== Description ==
Ilex hypoglauca grows up to 18 metres (59 ft) tall. Its smooth bark is grey. The leathery leaves are oblong to elliptic and measure up to 22.5 cm (9 in) long. The inflorescences, in cymes, feature white flowers. The roundish fruits are black.

== Distribution and habitat ==
Ilex hypoglauca is native to Borneo and Sumatra. Its habitat is in peat swamp forests.
