= Ilex florifera =

Conservation status
- Endangered (IUCN 3.1)

Scientific classification
- Kingdom: Plantae
- Clade: Tracheophytes
- Clade: Angiosperms
- Clade: Eudicots
- Clade: Asterids
- Order: Aquifoliales
- Family: Aquifoliaceae
- Genus: Ilex
- Species: I. florifera

Binomial name
- Ilex florifera Fawc. & Rendle

Species of holly

Ilex florifera is a species of plant in the family Aquifoliaceae. It is endemic to Jamaica.
