= Ilex condensata =

Conservation status
- Endangered (IUCN 3.1)

Scientific classification
- Kingdom: Plantae
- Clade: Tracheophytes
- Clade: Angiosperms
- Clade: Eudicots
- Clade: Asterids
- Order: Aquifoliales
- Family: Aquifoliaceae
- Genus: Ilex
- Species: I. condensata

Binomial name
- Ilex condensata Turcz.

Synonyms
- Ilex ambigua var. condensata (Turcz.) Loes.

Species of plant

Ilex condensata, the mezquite blanco, is a species of flowering plant in the holly family Aquifoliaceae, native to Mexico. It is typically found in forests at elevations from 100 to 1,950 m (330 to 6,400 ft).
