= Ilex diospyroides =

Conservation status
- Least Concern (IUCN 2.3)

Scientific classification
- Kingdom: Plantae
- Clade: Embryophytes
- Clade: Tracheophytes
- Clade: Spermatophytes
- Clade: Angiosperms
- Clade: Eudicots
- Clade: Asterids
- Order: Aquifoliales
- Family: Aquifoliaceae
- Genus: Ilex
- Species: I. diospyroides

Binomial name
- Ilex diospyroides Reissek

Species of holly

Ilex diospyroides is a species of plant in the family Aquifoliaceae. It is endemic to Venezuela.
