= Ilex glomerata =

Conservation status
- Least Concern (IUCN 3.1)

Scientific classification
- Kingdom: Plantae
- Clade: Tracheophytes
- Clade: Angiosperms
- Clade: Eudicots
- Clade: Asterids
- Order: Aquifoliales
- Family: Aquifoliaceae
- Genus: Ilex
- Species: I. glomerata

Binomial name
- Ilex glomerata King

Species of holly

Ilex glomerata is a species of tree or shrub in the family Aquifoliaceae. It grows up to 20 metres (70 ft). The flowers are yellow green or yellow. The fruits are round, red, up to 1 cm (0.4 in) in diameter. The specific epithet glomerata is from the Latin meaning 'closely gathered', referring to the flowers. Habitat is forests from sea level to 1,700 metres (5,600 ft) altitude. I. glomerata is found in Burma, Sumatra, Peninsular Malaysia and Borneo.
