= Ilex chapaensis =

Scientific classification
- Kingdom: Plantae
- Clade: Tracheophytes
- Clade: Angiosperms
- Clade: Eudicots
- Clade: Asterids
- Order: Aquifoliales
- Family: Aquifoliaceae
- Genus: Ilex
- Species: I. chapaensis

Binomial name
- Ilex chapaensis Merr.

Species of holly

Ilex chapaensis is a species of holly native to China. It is a deciduous shrub. The fruits are black when mature. The fruits are drupes which are eaten by civets that disperse the seeds through their droppings. It is grown as an ornamental plant.
