= Ilex ericoides =

Conservation status
- Vulnerable (IUCN 3.1)

Scientific classification
- Kingdom: Plantae
- Clade: Tracheophytes
- Clade: Angiosperms
- Clade: Eudicots
- Clade: Asterids
- Order: Aquifoliales
- Family: Aquifoliaceae
- Genus: Ilex
- Species: I. ericoides

Binomial name
- Ilex ericoides Loes.

Synonyms
- Ilex spinulosa Cuatrec.

Species of plant

Ilex ericoides is a species of flowering plant in the family Aquifoliaceae. It is native to Colombia, Ecuador, and Peru.
