= Ilex cerasifolia =

Scientific classification
- Kingdom: Plantae
- Clade: Tracheophytes
- Clade: Angiosperms
- Clade: Eudicots
- Clade: Asterids
- Order: Aquifoliales
- Family: Aquifoliaceae
- Genus: Ilex
- Species: I. cerasifolia

Binomial name
- Ilex cerasifolia Reissek

Species of holly

Ilex cerasifolia is a species of the genus Ilex in the family Aquifoliaceae. It is native to Brazil, typically in Cerrado vegetation.
