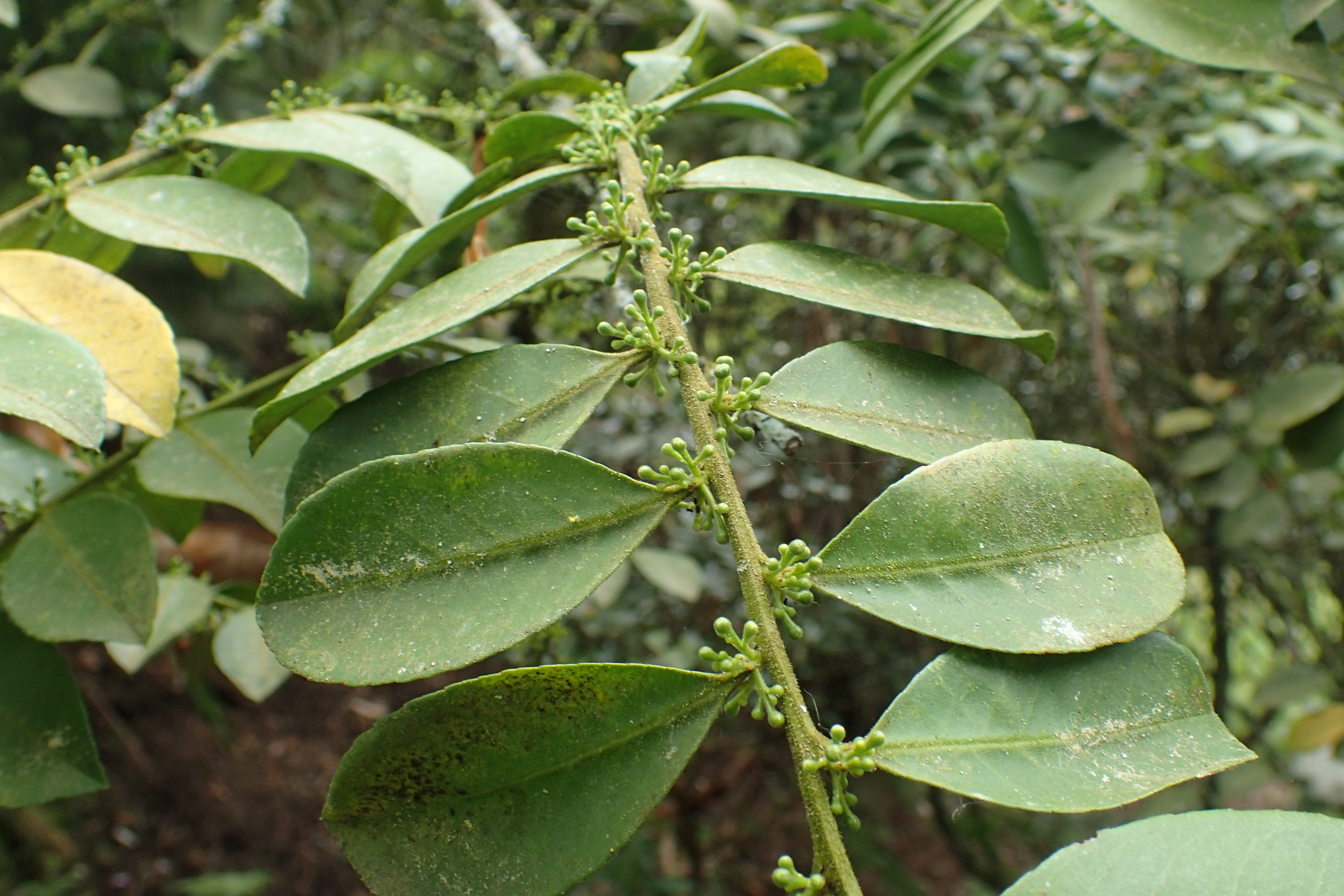
- At Hackfalls Arboretum, New Zealand

Conservation status
- Least Concern (IUCN 3.1)

Scientific classification
- Kingdom: Plantae
- Clade: Tracheophytes
- Clade: Angiosperms
- Clade: Eudicots
- Clade: Asterids
- Order: Aquifoliales
- Family: Aquifoliaceae
- Genus: Ilex
- Species: I. triflora

Binomial name
- Ilex triflora Blume

Synonyms
- Ilex fleuryana Tardieu; Ilex griffithii Hook.f.; Ilex horsfieldii Miq.; Ilex leptophylla W.P.Fang & Z.M.Tan; Ilex lobbiana Rolfe; Ilex theicarpa Hand.-Mazz.

= Ilex triflora =

Species of plant in the holly family

Ilex triflora is a plant in the family Aquifoliaceae, native to tropical Asia. The specific epithet triflora means 'three-flowered'.

== Description ==
Ilex triflora grows as a shrub or tree up to 8 metres (26 ft) tall, sometimes as an epiphyte. The bark is smooth. The leathery leaves are elliptic to ovate and measure up to 10 cm (4 in) long. The inflorescences, in cymes, feature purple to pink to white flowers. The roundish fruits are purple to black.

== Distribution and habitat ==
Ilex triflora is native to a wide area from the Assam region east to southern China and south to the Maluku Islands. Its habitat is in hill and montane forests, at elevations to 2,300 m (7,500 ft).
