= Ilex andicola =

Scientific classification
- Kingdom: Plantae
- Clade: Tracheophytes
- Clade: Angiosperms
- Clade: Eudicots
- Clade: Asterids
- Order: Aquifoliales
- Family: Aquifoliaceae
- Genus: Ilex
- Species: I. andicola

Binomial name
- Ilex andicola Loes.

Synonyms
- Ilex hualgayoca Loizeau & Spichiger

Species of holly

Ilex andicola is a species of tree in the family Aquifoliaceae. It is native to Bolivia, Ecuador, and Peru.
