= Ilex dabieshanensis =

Conservation status
- Endangered (IUCN 3.1)

Scientific classification
- Kingdom: Plantae
- Clade: Tracheophytes
- Clade: Angiosperms
- Clade: Eudicots
- Clade: Asterids
- Order: Aquifoliales
- Family: Aquifoliaceae
- Genus: Ilex
- Species: I. dabieshanensis

Binomial name
- Ilex dabieshanensis K.Yao & M.P.Deng

Species of holly

Ilex dabieshanensis is a species of flowering plant in the family Aquifoliaceae. It is a shrub or tree endemic to western Anhui Province in southeastern China.
