= Ilex harrisii =

Conservation status
- Near Threatened (IUCN 2.3)

Scientific classification
- Kingdom: Plantae
- Clade: Tracheophytes
- Clade: Angiosperms
- Clade: Eudicots
- Clade: Asterids
- Order: Aquifoliales
- Family: Aquifoliaceae
- Genus: Ilex
- Species: I. harrisii

Binomial name
- Ilex harrisii Loes.

Species of holly

Ilex harrisii is a species of flowering plant in the family Aquifoliaceae. It is endemic to Jamaica.
