= Ilex malaccensis =

Conservation status
- Least Concern (IUCN 3.1)

Scientific classification
- Kingdom: Plantae
- Clade: Tracheophytes
- Clade: Angiosperms
- Clade: Eudicots
- Clade: Asterids
- Order: Aquifoliales
- Family: Aquifoliaceae
- Genus: Ilex
- Species: I. malaccensis

Binomial name
- Ilex malaccensis Loes.

Species of holly

Ilex malaccensis is a species of flowering plant in the family Aquifoliaceae. It is distributed from Sumatra to New Guinea, with specimens from New Guinea differing from the western members of this species by their smaller leaves which are rust-coloured below.
