= Ilex spicata =

Conservation status
- Least Concern (IUCN 3.1)

Scientific classification
- Kingdom: Plantae
- Clade: Tracheophytes
- Clade: Angiosperms
- Clade: Eudicots
- Clade: Asterids
- Order: Aquifoliales
- Family: Aquifoliaceae
- Genus: Ilex
- Species: I. spicata

Binomial name
- Ilex spicata Blume

Synonyms
- Prinos spicatus (Blume) Miq.

Species of plant in the holly family

Ilex spicata is a plant in the family Aquifoliaceae, native to maritime Southeast Asia. The specific epithet spicata refers to the spike form of the inflorescence.

== Description ==
Ilex spicata grows as a shrub or tree up to 13.5 metres (40 ft) tall. Its smooth bark is white or grey. The leathery leaves are oblong to elliptic and measure up to 8.5 cm (3 in) long, occasionally to 13 cm (5 in). The inflorescences, in spikes, feature white flowers. The roundish fruits are red, ripening to black.

== Varieties ==
Two varieties of Ilex spicata are recognised:

- Ilex spicata var. spicata – native to Sumatra, Java, Borneo, Sulawesi, in montane forests to elevations of 1,800 m (6,000 ft)
- Ilex spicata var. harmsiana (Loes.) S.Andrews – endemic to Borneo, in montane forests and on ridges, to elevations of 2,300 m (8,000 ft)
