= Ilex ciliolata =

Conservation status
- Near Threatened (IUCN 3.1)

Scientific classification
- Kingdom: Plantae
- Clade: Tracheophytes
- Clade: Angiosperms
- Clade: Eudicots
- Clade: Asterids
- Order: Aquifoliales
- Family: Aquifoliaceae
- Genus: Ilex
- Species: I. ciliolata

Binomial name
- Ilex ciliolata Steyerm.

Species of holly

Ilex ciliolata is a species of plant in the family Aquifoliaceae. It is endemic to Venezuela.
