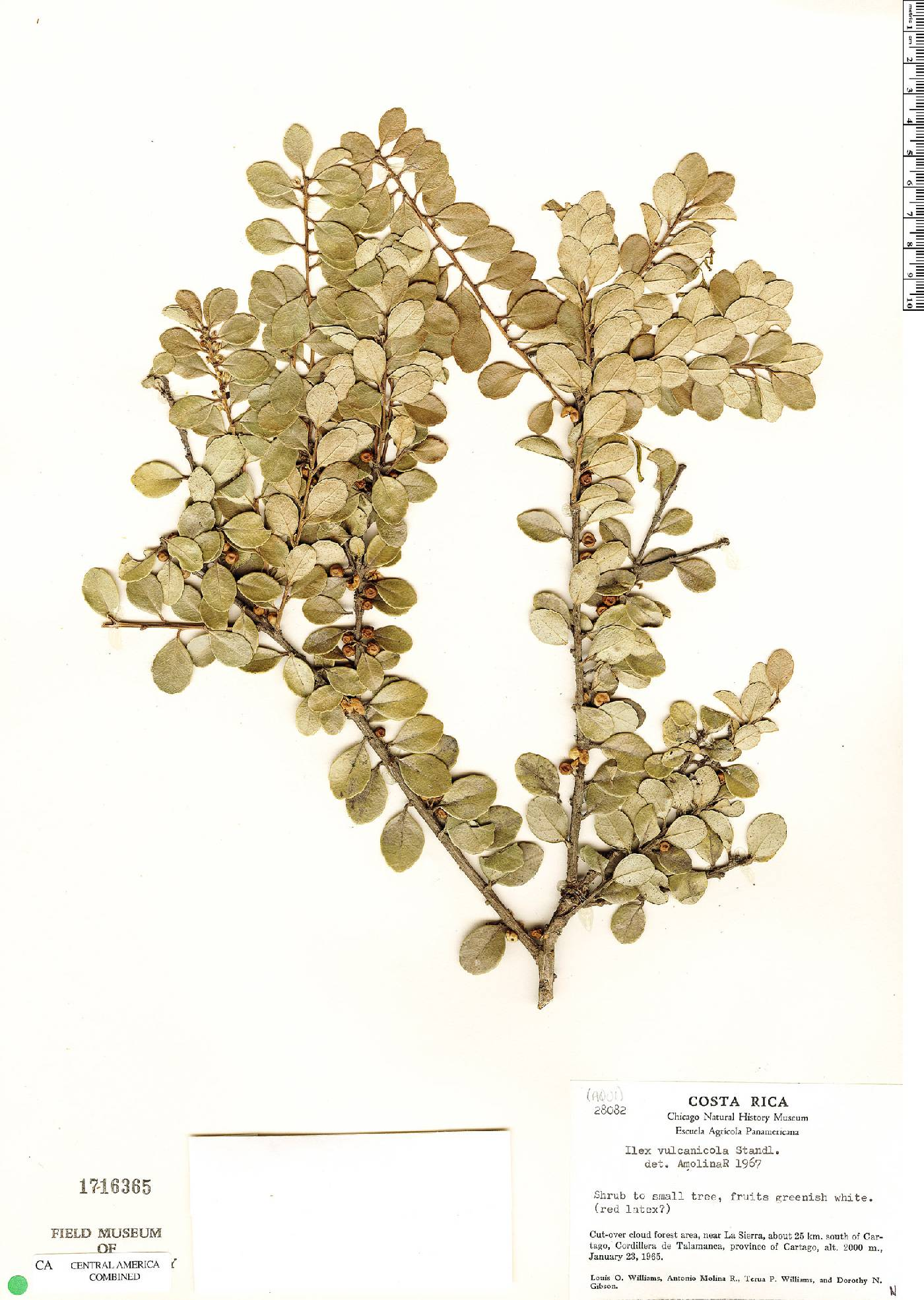

Conservation status
- Near Threatened (IUCN 3.1)

Scientific classification
- Kingdom: Plantae
- Clade: Embryophytes
- Clade: Tracheophytes
- Clade: Spermatophytes
- Clade: Angiosperms
- Clade: Eudicots
- Clade: Asterids
- Order: Aquifoliales
- Family: Aquifoliaceae
- Genus: Ilex
- Species: I. vulcanicola

Binomial name
- Ilex vulcanicola Standl.

= Ilex vulcanicola =

Species of holly

Ilex vulcanicola is a species of plant in the family Aquifoliaceae. It is found in Costa Rica and Panama. It is threatened by habitat loss.
