= Ilex pauciflora =

Conservation status
- Endangered (IUCN 2.3)

Scientific classification
- Kingdom: Plantae
- Clade: Tracheophytes
- Clade: Angiosperms
- Clade: Eudicots
- Clade: Asterids
- Order: Aquifoliales
- Family: Aquifoliaceae
- Genus: Ilex
- Species: I. pauciflora

Binomial name
- Ilex pauciflora Ridl.

Species of holly

Ilex pauciflora is a species of flowering plant in the family Aquifoliaceae. It is a tree endemic to Peninsular Malaysia. It is threatened by habitat loss.

== Taxonomy ==
The specific epithet pauciflora is Latin for 'few-flowered'.
