= Ilex wallichii =

Conservation status
- Least Concern (IUCN 3.1)

Scientific classification
- Kingdom: Plantae
- Clade: Tracheophytes
- Clade: Angiosperms
- Clade: Eudicots
- Clade: Asterids
- Order: Aquifoliales
- Family: Aquifoliaceae
- Genus: Ilex
- Species: I. wallichii

Binomial name
- Ilex wallichii Hook.f.

Species of plant in the holly family

Ilex wallichii is a plant in the family Aquifoliaceae, native to Southeast Asia. It is named for the Danish botanist Nathaniel Wallich.

== Description ==
Ilex wallichii grows as a shrub or tree up to 18 metres (60 ft) tall. Its smooth bark is white or grey. The leathery leaves are obovate to elliptic to oblong and measure up to 13 cm (5 in) long. The inflorescences, in cymes, feature greenish-white flowers. The fruits are dark red.

== Distribution and habitat ==
Ilex wallichii is native to an area from Myanmar to Borneo. In Borneo, it is found in kerangas and peat swamp forests, at elevations to 1,000 m (3,300 ft).
