= Ilex urbaniana =

Conservation status
- Vulnerable (IUCN 3.1)

Scientific classification
- Kingdom: Plantae
- Clade: Tracheophytes
- Clade: Angiosperms
- Clade: Eudicots
- Clade: Asterids
- Order: Aquifoliales
- Family: Aquifoliaceae
- Genus: Ilex
- Species: I. urbaniana

Binomial name
- Ilex urbaniana Loes. ex Urb.

Species of holly

Ilex urbaniana, known commonly as the Urban's holly, is a species of tree or shrub in the Aquifoliaceae or holly family of flowering plants. It is found on Hispaniola, Puerto Rico, and the U.S. and British Virgin Islands.
