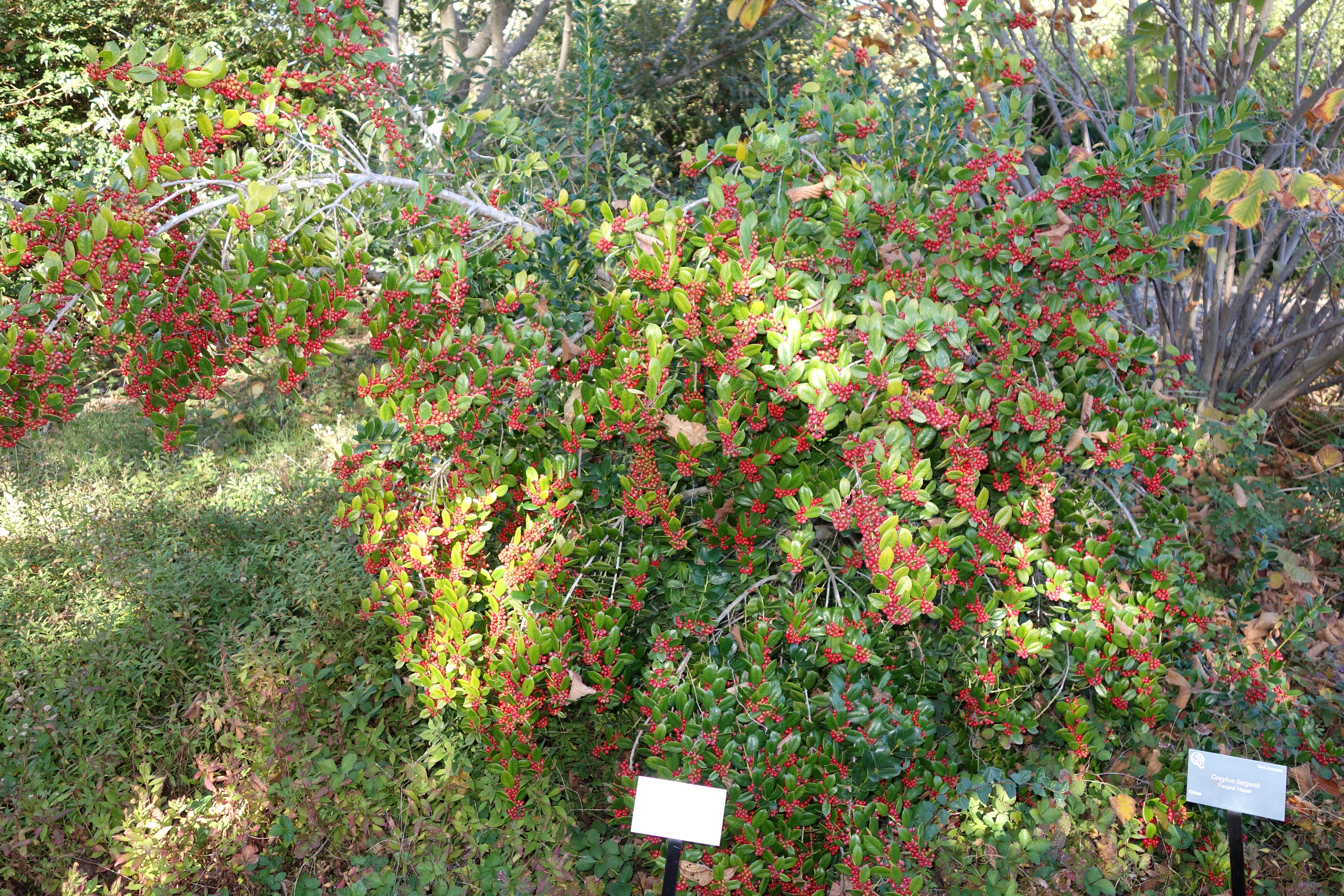

Scientific classification
- Kingdom: Plantae
- Clade: Tracheophytes
- Clade: Angiosperms
- Clade: Eudicots
- Clade: Asterids
- Order: Aquifoliales
- Family: Aquifoliaceae
- Genus: Ilex
- Species: I. dimorphophylla

Binomial name
- Ilex dimorphophylla Koidz.

= Ilex dimorphophylla =

Species of holly

Ilex dimorphophylla, the Okinawa holly, is a holly species endemic to Amami Ōshima of the Ryukyu Islands. It is compact shrub of up to 6 feet in height, with dense green leaves with spines towards the ends, and red berries. It is cultivated as a hedge in Europe and North America.
