= Ilex amygdalina =

Scientific classification
- Kingdom: Plantae
- Clade: Tracheophytes
- Clade: Angiosperms
- Clade: Eudicots
- Clade: Asterids
- Order: Aquifoliales
- Family: Aquifoliaceae
- Genus: Ilex
- Species: I. amygdalina

Binomial name
- Ilex amygdalina Reissek ex Loes.

Species of holly

Ilex amygdalina is a tree in the family Aquifoliaceae. It is endemic to Peru.
