= Ilex jauaensis =

Conservation status
- Least Concern (IUCN 3.1)

Scientific classification
- Kingdom: Plantae
- Clade: Tracheophytes
- Clade: Angiosperms
- Clade: Eudicots
- Clade: Asterids
- Order: Aquifoliales
- Family: Aquifoliaceae
- Genus: Ilex
- Species: I. jauaensis

Binomial name
- Ilex jauaensis Steyerm.

Species of holly

Ilex jauaensis is a species of plant in the family Aquifoliaceae. It is endemic to Venezuela.
