= Ilex emmae =

Conservation status
- Endangered (IUCN 2.3)

Scientific classification
- Kingdom: Plantae
- Clade: Tracheophytes
- Clade: Angiosperms
- Clade: Eudicots
- Clade: Asterids
- Order: Aquifoliales
- Family: Aquifoliaceae
- Genus: Ilex
- Species: I. emmae

Binomial name
- Ilex emmae D.M. Hicks

Species of holly

Ilex emmae is a species of tree in the family Aquifoliaceae. It is endemic to New Guinea, occurring in primary forest and forest edge with grassland at 700–1100 metres above sea level, and named after Holly Emma Hicks.
