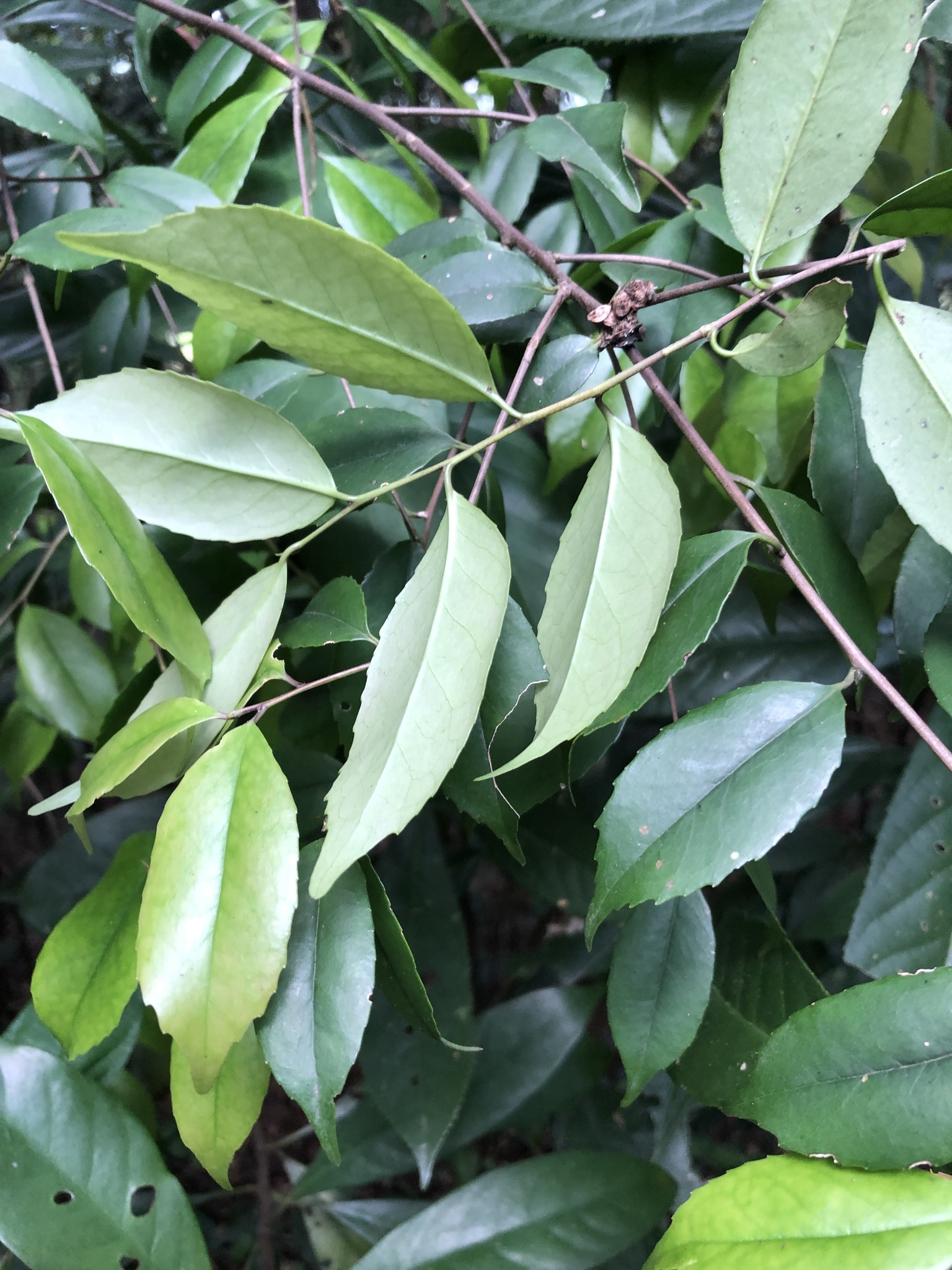

Conservation status
- Endangered (IUCN 3.1)

Scientific classification
- Kingdom: Plantae
- Clade: Tracheophytes
- Clade: Angiosperms
- Clade: Eudicots
- Clade: Asterids
- Order: Aquifoliales
- Family: Aquifoliaceae
- Genus: Ilex
- Species: I. uraiensis

Binomial name
- Ilex uraiensis Yamam.

= Ilex uraiensis =

Species of holly

Ilex uraiensis is a species of plant in the family Aquifoliaceae. It is endemic to Taiwan.

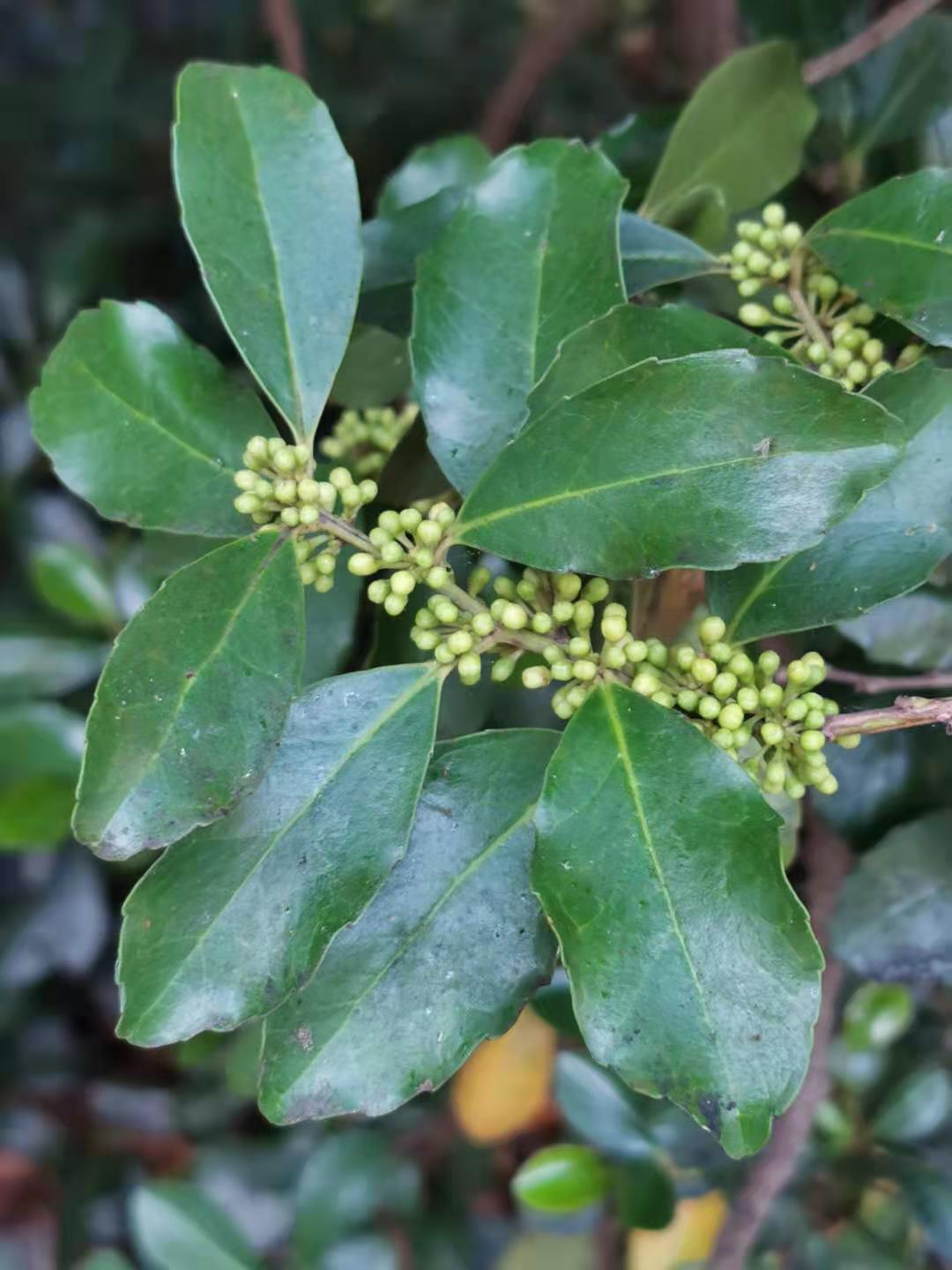
Leaves and inflorescence

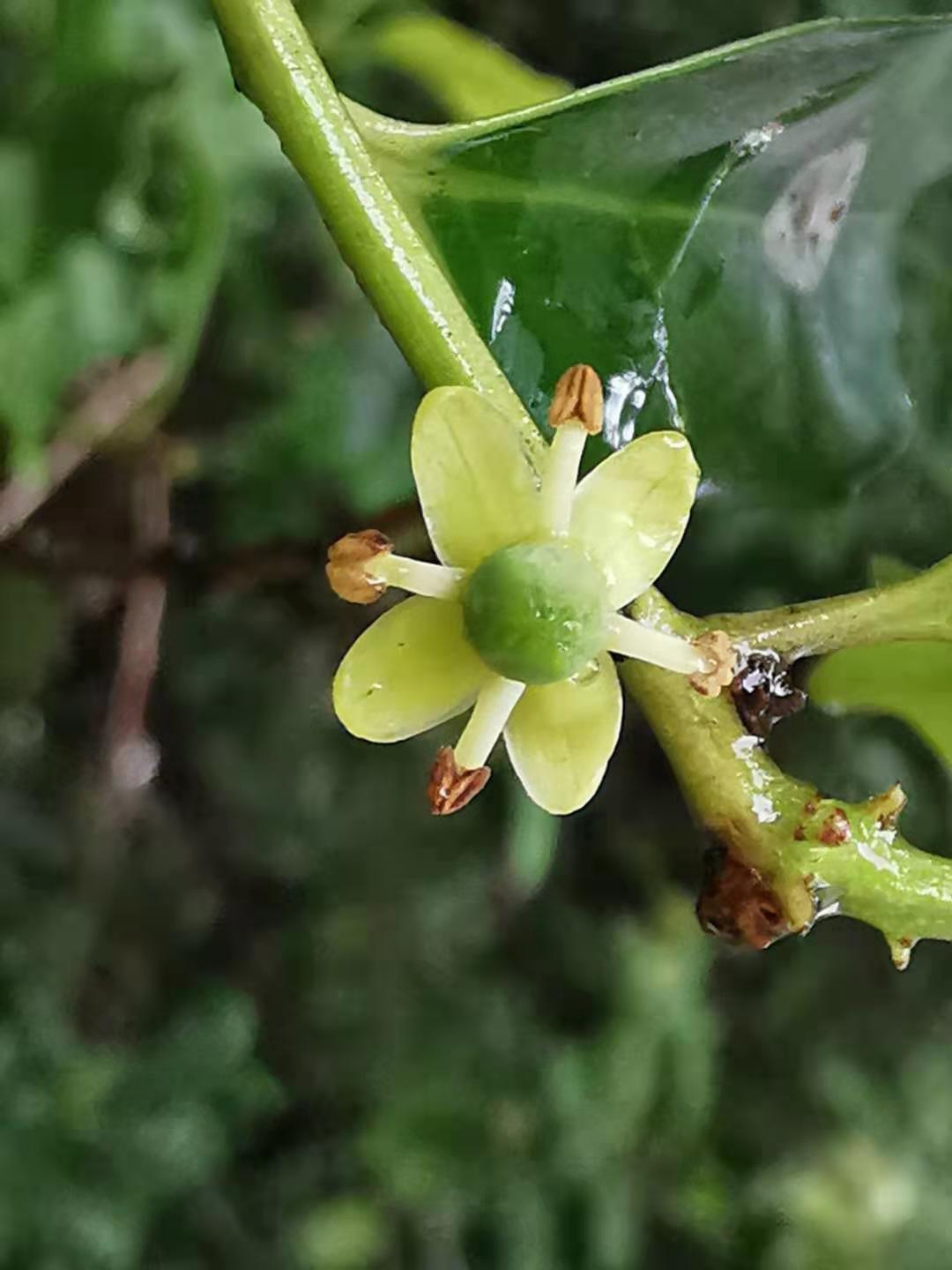
Flower, stamens and petals crisscross

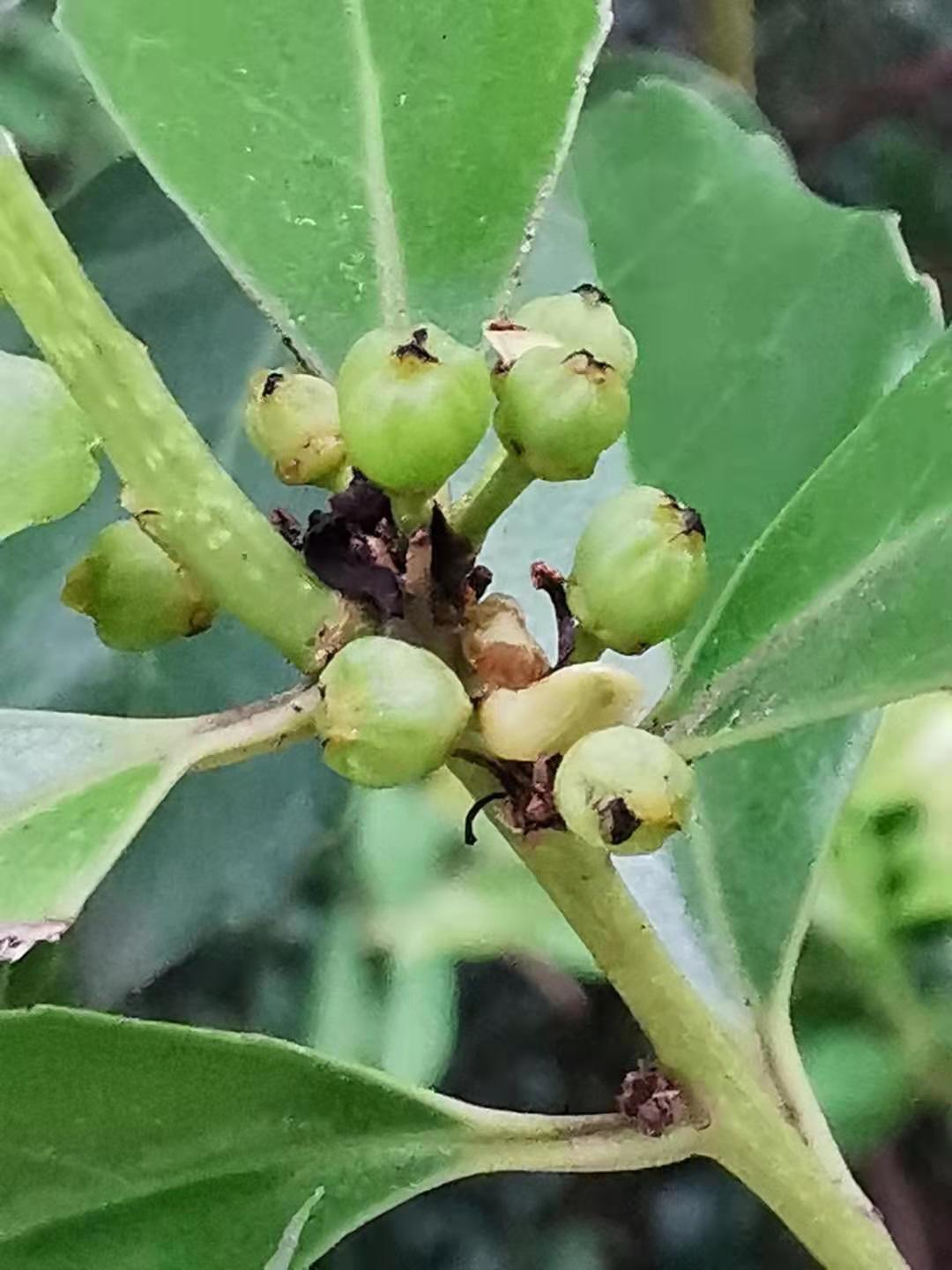
The fruit is red when ripe.

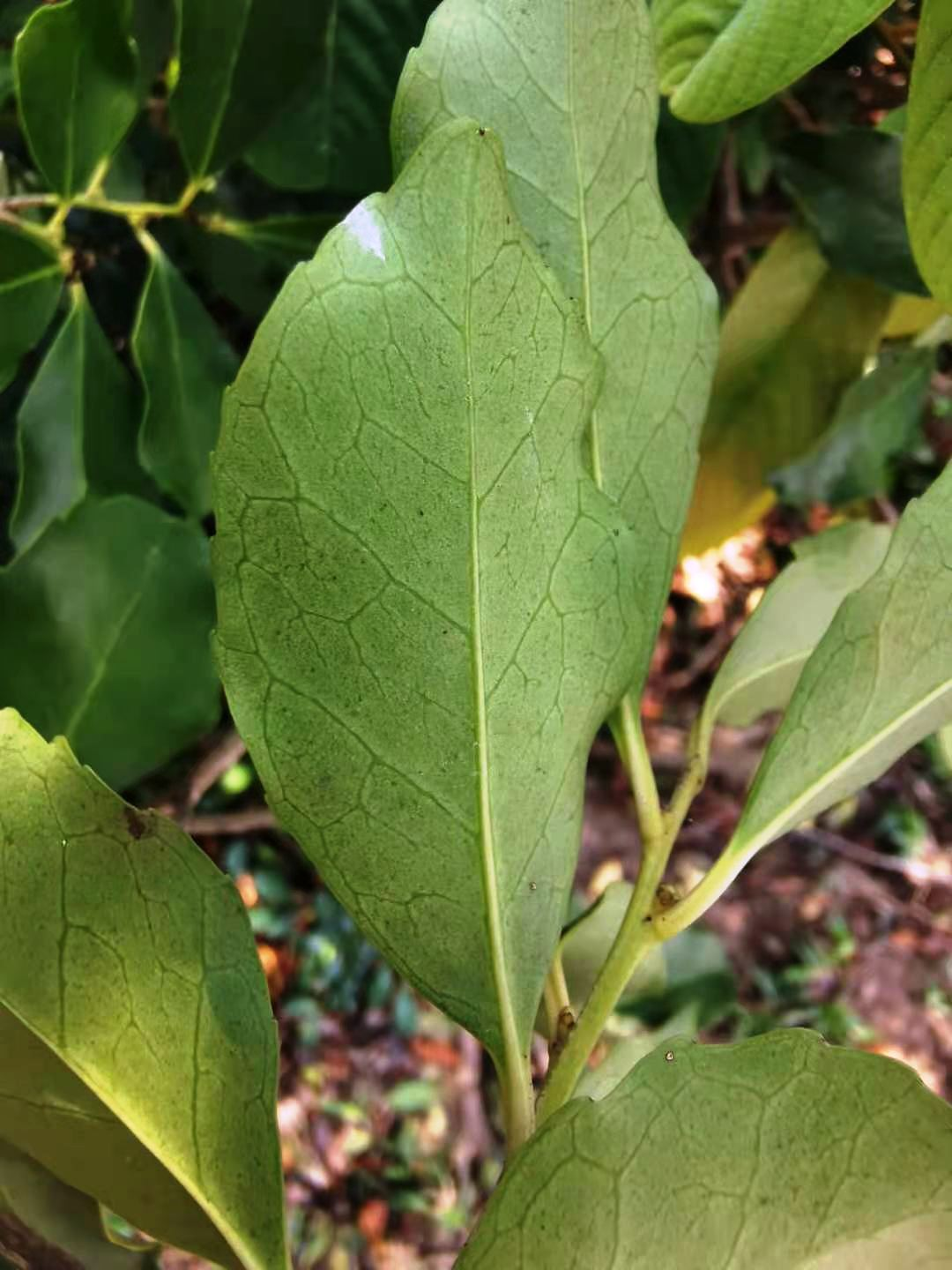
Veins on the underside of leaf.

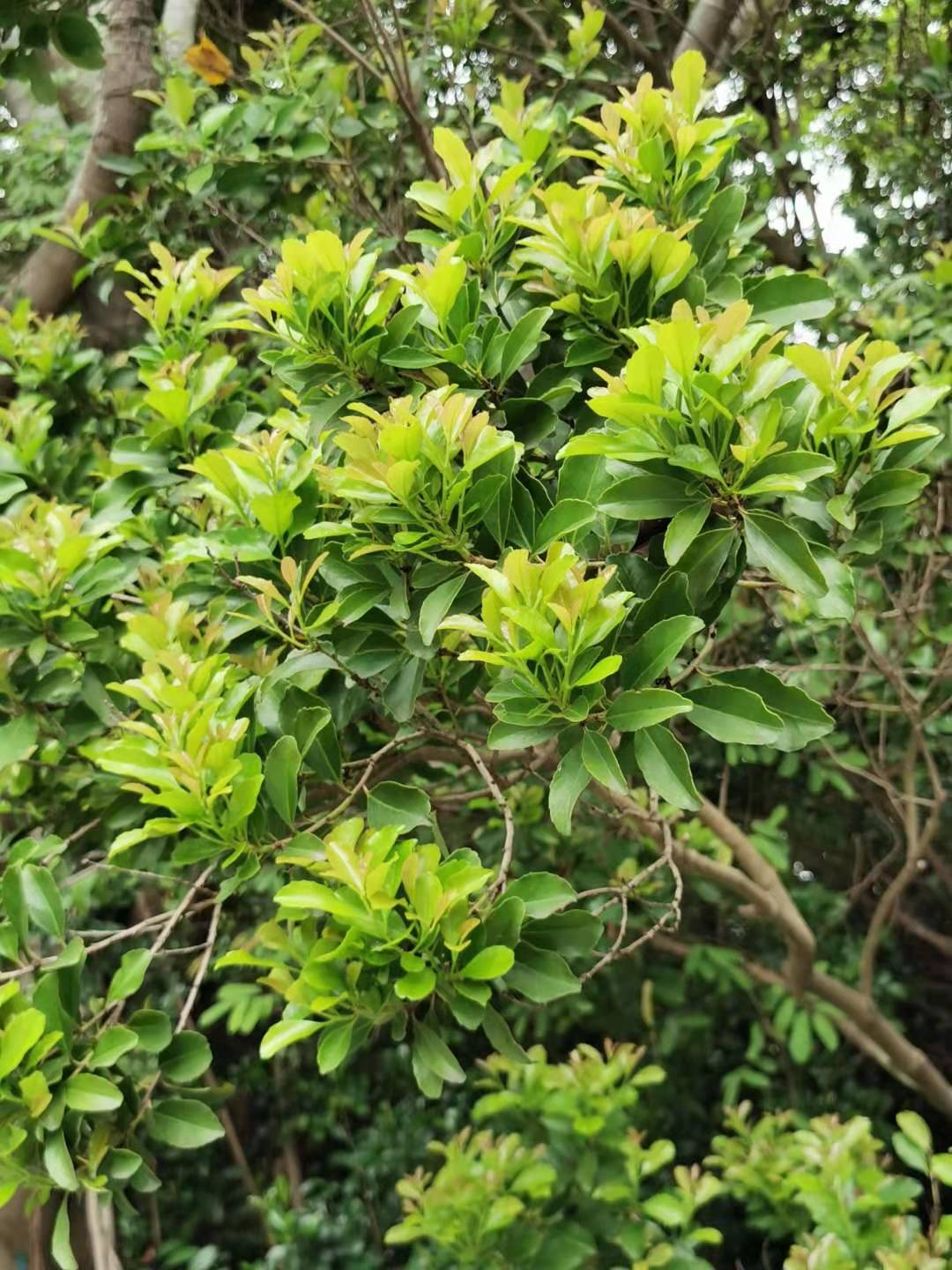
Leaves alternate, dense. Young leaves are red.

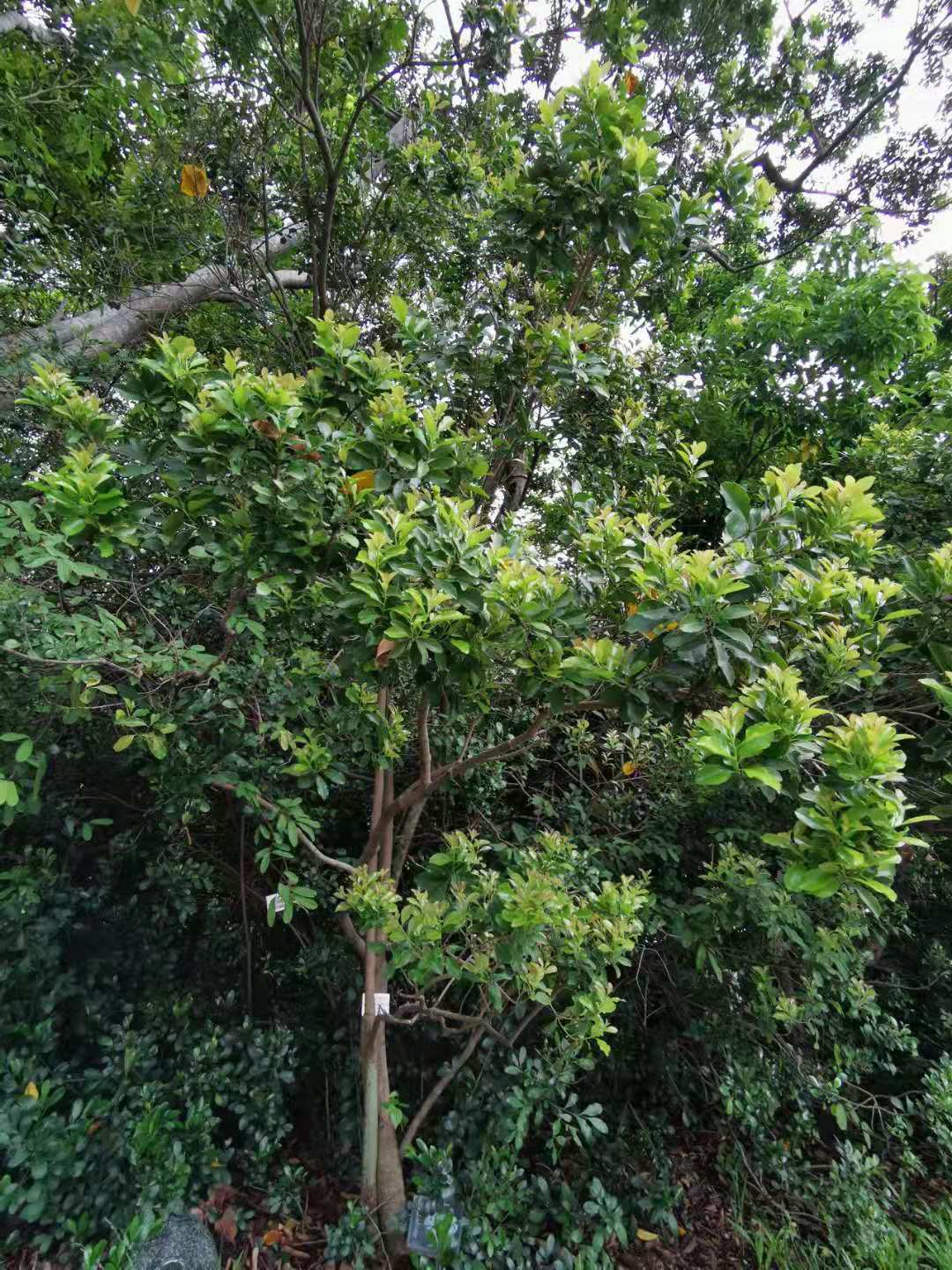
Plant in spring

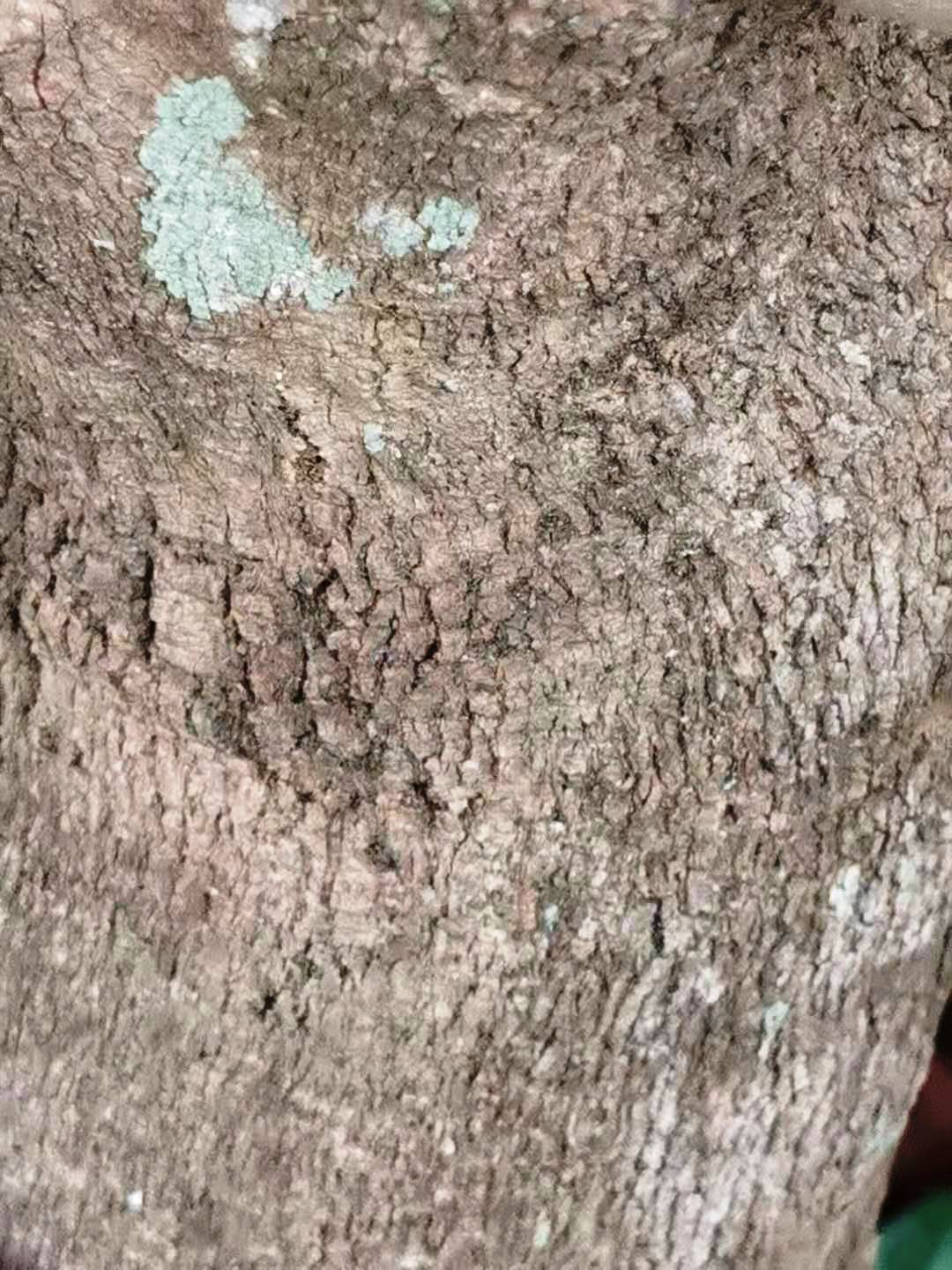
Bark

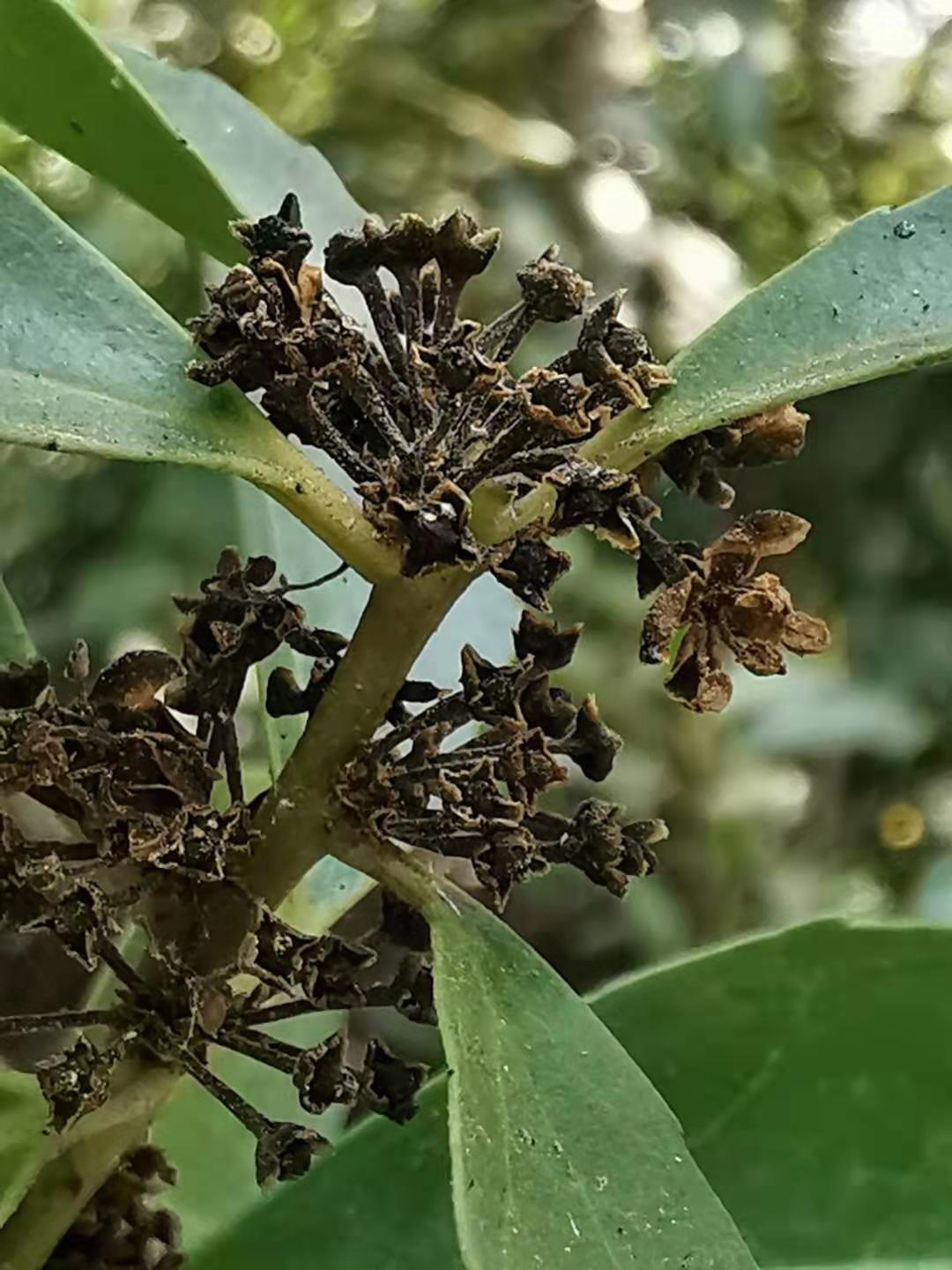
Flowers remain on branches after withering.
