= Ilex trichocarpa =

Conservation status
- Endangered (IUCN 3.1)

Scientific classification
- Kingdom: Plantae
- Clade: Tracheophytes
- Clade: Angiosperms
- Clade: Eudicots
- Clade: Asterids
- Order: Aquifoliales
- Family: Aquifoliaceae
- Genus: Ilex
- Species: I. trichocarpa

Binomial name
- Ilex trichocarpa H.W.Li ex Y.R.Li

Species of holly

Ilex trichocarpa is a species of flowering plant in the family Aquifoliaceae. It is a shrub or tree endemic to southeastern Yunnan Province of south-central China.
