= Ilex promecophylla =

Conservation status
- Data Deficient (IUCN 3.1)

Scientific classification
- Kingdom: Plantae
- Clade: Tracheophytes
- Clade: Angiosperms
- Clade: Eudicots
- Clade: Asterids
- Order: Aquifoliales
- Family: Aquifoliaceae
- Genus: Ilex
- Species: I. promecophylla

Binomial name
- Ilex promecophylla S.Andrews

Species of tree in the holly family

Ilex promecophylla is a tree in the family Aquifoliaceae, native to Borneo. The specific epithet promecophylla means 'oblong leaves'.

== Description ==
Ilex promecophylla grows up to 25 metres (80 ft) tall. The bark is smooth. The leathery leaves are obovate to oblong and measure up to 17 cm (7 in) long, occasionally to 24 cm (9 in) long. The inflorescences, in cymes, feature greenish to white flowers. The roundish fruits are red.

== Distribution and habitat ==
Ilex promecophylla is endemic to Borneo. It is present in some protected areas, including Lambir Hills National Park in Sarawak. Its habitat is forests on hills and ridges, at elevations to around 1,500 m (5,000 ft).
