= Ilex venulosa =

Conservation status
- Endangered (IUCN 2.3)

Scientific classification
- Kingdom: Plantae
- Clade: Tracheophytes
- Clade: Angiosperms
- Clade: Eudicots
- Clade: Asterids
- Order: Aquifoliales
- Family: Aquifoliaceae
- Genus: Ilex
- Species: I. venulosa

Binomial name
- Ilex venulosa Hook.f.

Varieties
- Ilex venulosa var. simplicifrons Hu; Ilex venulosa var. venulosa

Species of holly

Ilex venulosa is a species of flowering plant in the family Aquifoliaceae. It is a shrub or tree native to the eastern Himalayas including Arunachal Pradesh, Assam, Bangladesh, northern Myanmar, and southwestern and southern Yunnan in south-central China.

Two varieties are accepted:

- Ilex venulosa var. simplicifrons Hu – Assam and southwestern Yunnan
- Ilex venulosa var. venulosa – Eastern Himalayas to Assam, Bangladesh, northern Myanmar, and southern and southwestern Yunnan
