= Ilex toroidea =

Conservation status
- Endangered (IUCN 3.1)

Scientific classification
- Kingdom: Plantae
- Clade: Tracheophytes
- Clade: Angiosperms
- Clade: Eudicots
- Clade: Asterids
- Order: Aquifoliales
- Family: Aquifoliaceae
- Genus: Ilex
- Species: I. toroidea

Binomial name
- Ilex toroidea D.M. Hicks

Species of holly

Ilex toroidea is a small tree in the family Aquifoliaceae. It is endemic to Papua New Guinea, occurring at 700–820 metres above sea level.
