= Ilex hicksii =

Conservation status
- Least Concern (IUCN 2.3)

Scientific classification
- Kingdom: Plantae
- Clade: Tracheophytes
- Clade: Angiosperms
- Clade: Eudicots
- Clade: Asterids
- Order: Aquifoliales
- Family: Aquifoliaceae
- Genus: Ilex
- Species: I. hicksii

Binomial name
- Ilex hicksii I.M.Turner

Species of holly

Ilex hicksii is a species of plant in the family Aquifoliaceae. It is endemic to Western New Guinea, occurring to 2300 metres above sea level.
