= Ilex costaricensis =

Conservation status
- Least Concern (IUCN 3.1)

Scientific classification
- Kingdom: Plantae
- Clade: Tracheophytes
- Clade: Angiosperms
- Clade: Eudicots
- Clade: Asterids
- Order: Aquifoliales
- Family: Aquifoliaceae
- Genus: Ilex
- Species: I. costaricensis

Binomial name
- Ilex costaricensis J.D.Sm.

Species of holly

Ilex costaricensis is a species of plant in the family Aquifoliaceae. It is found in Costa Rica, Nicaragua, and Panama. It is threatened by habitat loss.
