= Ilex shimeica =

Conservation status
- Endangered (IUCN 3.1)

Scientific classification
- Kingdom: Plantae
- Clade: Tracheophytes
- Clade: Angiosperms
- Clade: Eudicots
- Clade: Asterids
- Order: Aquifoliales
- Family: Aquifoliaceae
- Genus: Ilex
- Species: I. shimeica

Binomial name
- Ilex shimeica K.F.Kwok

Species of holly

Ilex shimeica is a species of flowering plant in the family Aquifoliaceae. It is a tree endemic to the island of Hainan in southern China.
