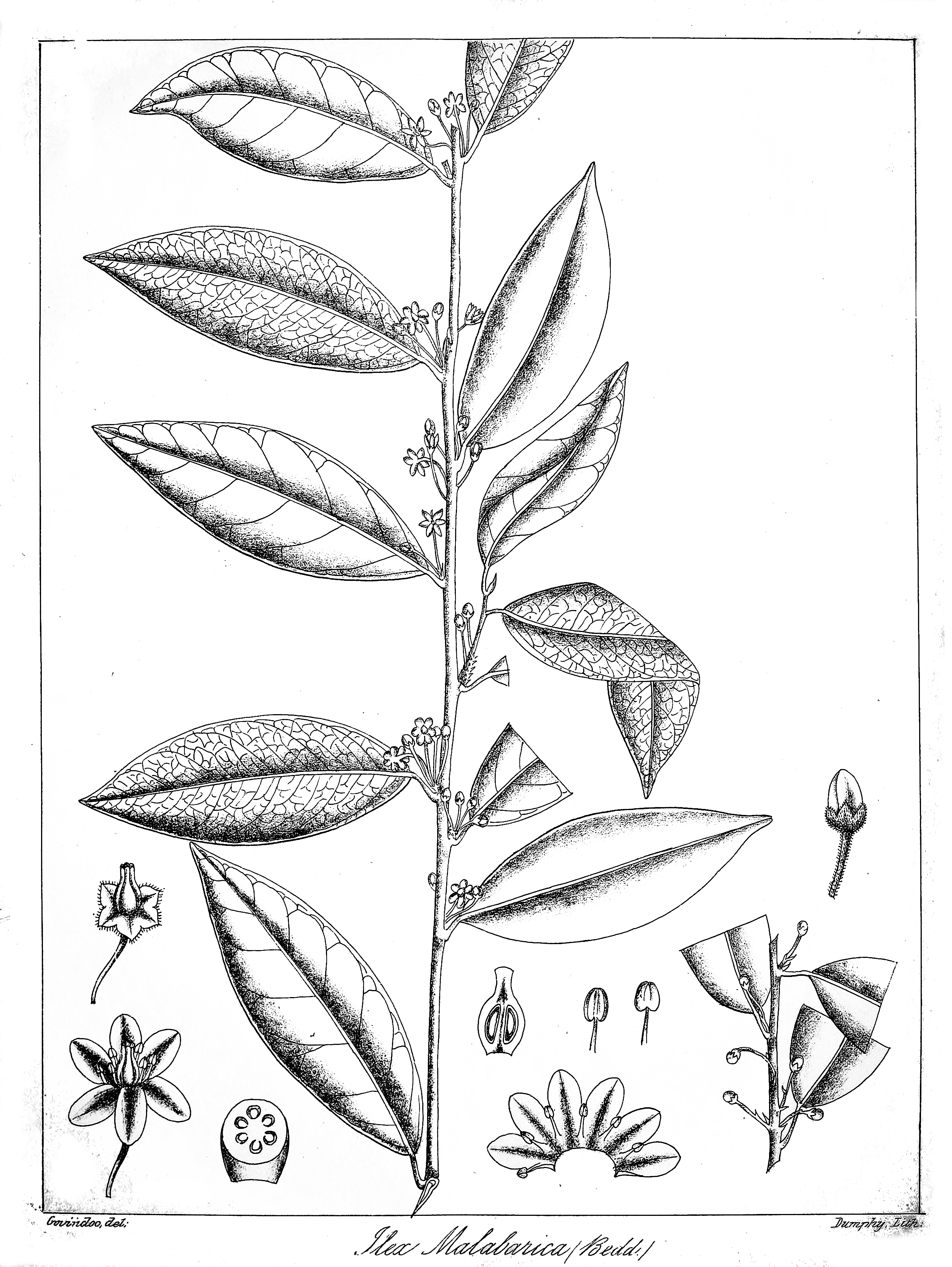

Scientific classification
- Kingdom: Plantae
- Clade: Tracheophytes
- Clade: Angiosperms
- Clade: Eudicots
- Clade: Asterids
- Order: Aquifoliales
- Family: Aquifoliaceae
- Genus: Ilex
- Species: I. malabarica

Binomial name
- Ilex malabarica Bedd.

= Ilex malabarica =

Species of holly

Ilex malabarica is a species of plant in the family Aquifoliaceae. It is native to western India.
