= Ilex peiradena =

Conservation status
- Endangered (IUCN 3.1)

Scientific classification
- Kingdom: Plantae
- Clade: Tracheophytes
- Clade: Angiosperms
- Clade: Eudicots
- Clade: Asterids
- Order: Aquifoliales
- Family: Aquifoliaceae
- Genus: Ilex
- Species: I. peiradena

Binomial name
- Ilex peiradena S.Y.Hu

Species of holly

Ilex peiradena is a species of flowering plant in the family Aquifoliaceae. It is a shrub native to southern Guangxi Province in southern China and to northern Vietnam.

The species was described by Shiu-Ying Hu in 1950.
