= Ilex karuaiana =

Conservation status
- Vulnerable (IUCN 2.3)

Scientific classification
- Kingdom: Plantae
- Clade: Tracheophytes
- Clade: Angiosperms
- Clade: Eudicots
- Clade: Asterids
- Order: Aquifoliales
- Family: Aquifoliaceae
- Genus: Ilex
- Species: I. karuaiana

Binomial name
- Ilex karuaiana Steyerm.

Species of holly

Ilex karuaiana is a species of plant in the family Aquifoliaceae. It is endemic to Venezuela. It has been vulnerable status since 1998.
