= Ilex cymosa =

Conservation status
- Least Concern (IUCN 3.1)

Scientific classification
- Kingdom: Plantae
- Clade: Embryophytes
- Clade: Tracheophytes
- Clade: Spermatophytes
- Clade: Angiosperms
- Clade: Eudicots
- Clade: Asterids
- Order: Aquifoliales
- Family: Aquifoliaceae
- Genus: Ilex
- Species: I. cymosa

Binomial name
- Ilex cymosa Blume

Synonyms
- Ilex cumingiana Rolfe; Ilex fabrilis Pierre; Ilex philippinensis Rolfe; Ilex singapuriana Wall.; Ilex thorelii Pierre; Leucodermis javanica Planch. ex Hook.f.; Prinos cymosa Hassk.; Pseudehretia paniculata Turcz.

Species of tree in the holly family

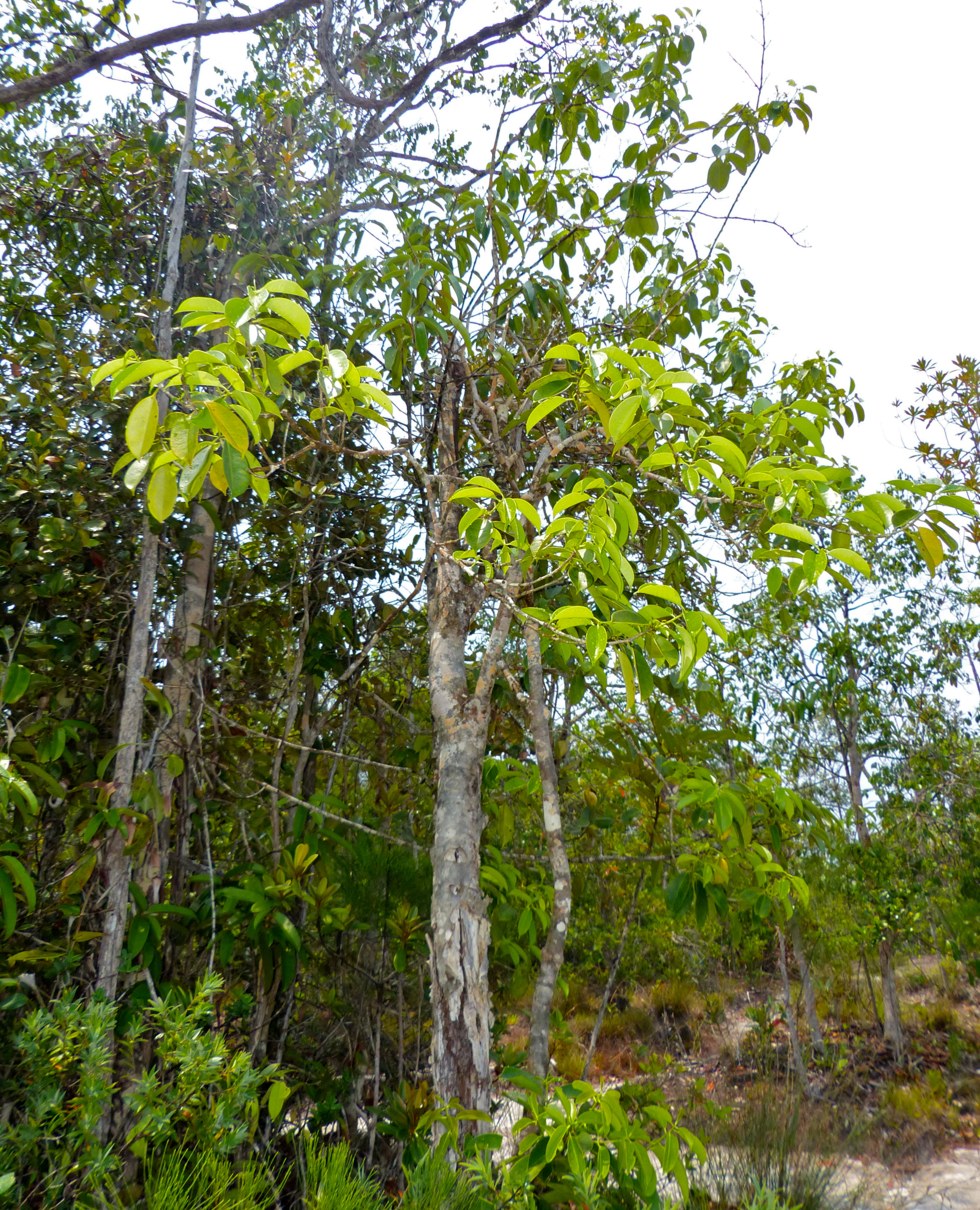

Ilex cymosa is a tree in the family Aquifoliaceae, native to Southeast Asia. The specific epithet cymosa refers to the cymous form of the inflorescence.

== Description ==
Ilex cymosa grows up to 30 metres (100 ft) tall. The papery leaves measure up to 14 cm (6 in) long. The inflorescences, in cymes, feature green to white flowers. The fruits, initially red, ripen to black.

== Distribution and habitat ==
Ilex cymosa is native to an area from Myanmar in the north; south and east through mainland and maritime Southeast Asia; to the Solomon Islands in the east. The species is found in a variety of habitats including in sandy areas, mangrove forests, swamps and hilly dipterocarp forests.

== Uses ==
Ilex cymosa is harvested for its timber. The tree's roots are locally used for medicinal purposes.
