= Ilex conocarpa =

Scientific classification
- Kingdom: Plantae
- Clade: Tracheophytes
- Clade: Angiosperms
- Clade: Eudicots
- Clade: Asterids
- Order: Aquifoliales
- Family: Aquifoliaceae
- Genus: Ilex
- Species: I. conocarpa

Binomial name
- Ilex conocarpa Reissek

Species of holly

Ilex conocarpa is a species in the genus Ilex of the family Aquifoliaceae. It is native to Brazil, typically in Cerrado vegetation.
