= Ilex pallida =

Conservation status
- Least Concern (IUCN 3.1)

Scientific classification
- Kingdom: Plantae
- Clade: Tracheophytes
- Clade: Angiosperms
- Clade: Eudicots
- Clade: Asterids
- Order: Aquifoliales
- Family: Aquifoliaceae
- Genus: Ilex
- Species: I. pallida

Binomial name
- Ilex pallida Standl.

Species of holly

Ilex pallida is a species of plant in the family Aquifoliaceae. It is found in El Salvador, Honduras, Nicaragua, Costa Rica, and Panama. It is threatened by habitat loss.

== Description ==
Ilex pallida is a shrub or small- to medium-sized tree, growing from 2 to 20 meters tall. It flowers from January to July and November, and fruits from March to December.

== Range and habitat ==
Ilex pallida grows in humid mountain forests in central America, from El Salvador and southern Honduras through Nicaragua and Costa Rica to western Panama. It grows between 700 and 3,300 meters elevation.

It is found in humid premontane and montane forests, including montane rainforests, cloud forests, and oak forests.
