= Ilex jamaicana =

Conservation status
- Endangered (IUCN 2.3)

Scientific classification
- Kingdom: Plantae
- Clade: Tracheophytes
- Clade: Angiosperms
- Clade: Eudicots
- Clade: Asterids
- Order: Aquifoliales
- Family: Aquifoliaceae
- Genus: Ilex
- Species: I. jamaicana

Binomial name
- Ilex jamaicana Proctor

Species of holly

Ilex jamaicana is a flowering plant species in the family Aquifoliaceae. It is a tree endemic to Jamaica. It is threatened by habitat loss.
