= Ilex suzukii =

Scientific classification
- Kingdom: Plantae
- Clade: Tracheophytes
- Clade: Angiosperms
- Clade: Eudicots
- Clade: Asterids
- Order: Aquifoliales
- Family: Aquifoliaceae
- Genus: Ilex
- Species: I. suzukii

Binomial name
- Ilex suzukii S.Y.Hu

Synonyms
- Ilex lupingsanensis H.E.Chiang

Species of plant

Ilex suzukii is a species of flowering plant in the holly family Aquifoliaceae, native to Taiwan. An evergreen shrub or small tree found in woods and hills at middle elevations, it has terete young branchlets and shiny castaneous fruit.
