= Ilex ficoidea =

Conservation status
- Least Concern (IUCN 3.1)

Scientific classification
- Kingdom: Plantae
- Clade: Tracheophytes
- Clade: Angiosperms
- Clade: Eudicots
- Clade: Asterids
- Order: Aquifoliales
- Family: Aquifoliaceae
- Genus: Ilex
- Species: I. ficoidea

Binomial name
- Ilex ficoidea Hemsl.

Synonyms
- Ilex buergeri f. glabra Loes.; Ilex glomeratiflora Hayata

Species of plant

Ilex ficoidea, the fig-leaved holly, is a species of flowering plant in the family Aquifoliaceae, native to southern China, Taiwan, and Vietnam. An evergreen shrub or tree usually 2 to 10 m (7 to 33 ft) tall, it is found in a wide variety of habitats at elevations from 100 to 1,500 m (300 to 4,900 ft). It is used as a street tree in Hong Kong.
