= Ilex occulta =

Conservation status
- Endangered (IUCN 3.1)

Scientific classification
- Kingdom: Plantae
- Clade: Tracheophytes
- Clade: Angiosperms
- Clade: Eudicots
- Clade: Asterids
- Order: Aquifoliales
- Family: Aquifoliaceae
- Genus: Ilex
- Species: I. occulta

Binomial name
- Ilex occulta C.J.Tseng

Species of holly

Ilex occulta is a species of flowering plant in the family Aquifoliaceae. It is a shrub endemic to Guangdong and Guangxi in southeastern China.
