= Ilex jelskii =

Conservation status
- Vulnerable (IUCN 2.3)

Scientific classification
- Kingdom: Plantae
- Clade: Tracheophytes
- Clade: Angiosperms
- Clade: Eudicots
- Clade: Asterids
- Order: Aquifoliales
- Family: Aquifoliaceae
- Genus: Ilex
- Species: I. jelskii

Binomial name
- Ilex jelskii Zahlbr.

Species of plant

Ilex jelskii is a species of plant in the family Aquifoliaceae. It is endemic to Peru.
