= Ilex hemiepiphytica =

Scientific classification
- Kingdom: Plantae
- Clade: Tracheophytes
- Clade: Angiosperms
- Clade: Eudicots
- Clade: Asterids
- Order: Aquifoliales
- Family: Aquifoliaceae
- Genus: Ilex
- Species: I. hemiepiphytica

Binomial name
- Ilex hemiepiphytica W.J. Hahn

Species of holly

Ilex hemiepiphytica is a plant species known only from Costa Rica.

Ilex hemiepiphytica is a tree up to 18 m tall, sometimes epiphytic when young (unusual in the genus). Leaves are thick and leathery, green above, olive or yellow-green below, elliptic to ovate, up to 13 cm long. Leaf margins are toothed with a spine at the tip of each tooth. Flowers are greenish to white, borne in small groups of the axils of the leaves. Fruits are spherical, red or purple, about 4 mm in diameter.
