= Ilex inundata =

Conservation status
- Least Concern (IUCN 3.1)

Scientific classification
- Kingdom: Plantae
- Clade: Tracheophytes
- Clade: Angiosperms
- Clade: Eudicots
- Clade: Asterids
- Order: Aquifoliales
- Family: Aquifoliaceae
- Genus: Ilex
- Species: I. inundata

Binomial name
- Ilex inundata Poepp. ex Reissek

Synonyms
- Ilex riparia Reissek

Species of holly

Ilex inundata is a species of tree in the family Aquifoliaceae. It is native to South America.
