= Ilex hualgayoca =

Scientific classification
- Kingdom: Plantae
- Clade: Tracheophytes
- Clade: Angiosperms
- Clade: Eudicots
- Clade: Asterids
- Order: Aquifoliales
- Family: Aquifoliaceae
- Genus: Ilex
- Species: I. hualgayoca

Binomial name
- Ilex hualgayoca Loizeau & Spichiger

Species of holly

Ilex hualgayoca is a species of tree in the family Aquifoliaceae. It is native to South America, being found at heights up to 2,900 metres (9,500 ft). It grows to a height of about 4 metres (13 ft).
