= Ilex williamsii =

Conservation status
- Critically Endangered (IUCN 3.1)

Scientific classification
- Kingdom: Plantae
- Clade: Tracheophytes
- Clade: Angiosperms
- Clade: Eudicots
- Clade: Asterids
- Order: Aquifoliales
- Family: Aquifoliaceae
- Genus: Ilex
- Species: I. williamsii

Binomial name
- Ilex williamsii Standl.

Species of holly

Ilex williamsii is a species of plant in the family Aquifoliaceae. It is endemic to Honduras. It is a seldom-collected cloud forest species. The plant is critically endangered as of 1998.
