= Ilex neblinensis =

Conservation status
- Vulnerable (IUCN 2.3)

Scientific classification
- Kingdom: Plantae
- Clade: Tracheophytes
- Clade: Angiosperms
- Clade: Eudicots
- Clade: Asterids
- Order: Aquifoliales
- Family: Aquifoliaceae
- Genus: Ilex
- Species: I. neblinensis

Binomial name
- Ilex neblinensis Edwin

Species of holly

Ilex neblinensis is a species of plant in the family Aquifoliaceae. It is found in Brazil and Venezuela.
