= M. spectabilis =

M. spectabilis may refer to:

- Macrocybe spectabilis, a mushroom species
- Madhuca spectabilis, a tree species
- Malus spectabilis, a crabapple species
- Manilkara spectabilis, a tree species
- Marumba spectabilis, a moth species
- Melaleuca spectabilis, a plant species
- Melanophryniscus spectabilis, a toad species
- Melica spectabilis, a grass species
- Micropholis spectabilis, a flowering plant species
- Miltonia spectabilis, an orchid species
- Mopalia spectabilis, a mollusc species
- Murex spectabilis, a sea snail species
- Myelobia spectabilis, a moth species
