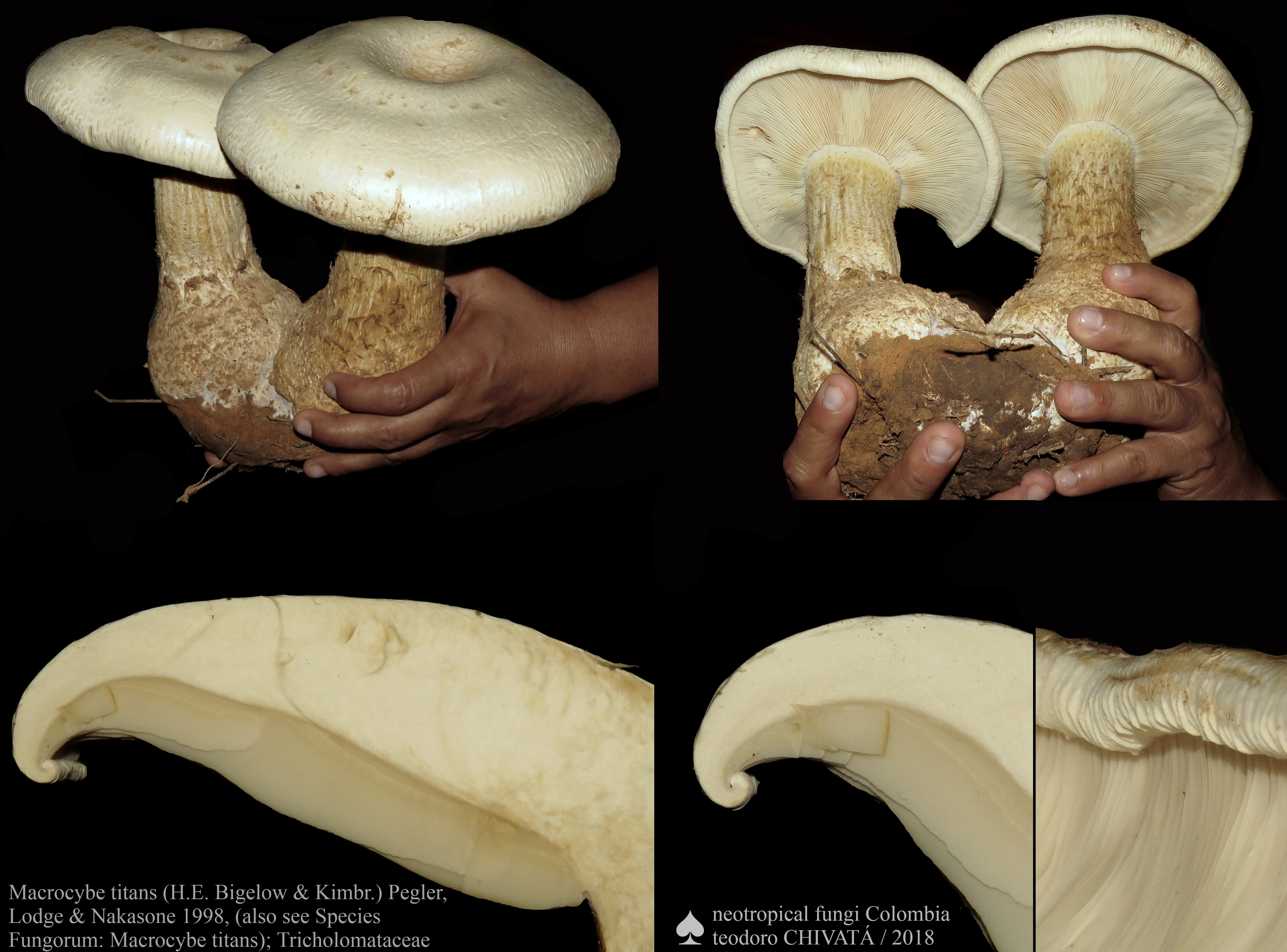

Scientific classification
- Kingdom: Fungi
- Division: Basidiomycota
- Class: Agaricomycetes
- Order: Agaricales
- Family: Callistosporiaceae
- Genus: Macrocybe
- Species: M. titans

Binomial name
- Macrocybe titans (H.E. Bigelow & Kimbr.) Pegler, Lodge & Nakasone

= Macrocybe titans =

Species of mushroom

Macrocybe titans
- Mycological characteristics
- Gills on hymenium
- Cap is convex
- Hymenium is adnexed
- Stipe is bare
- Spore print is cream
- Ecology is saprotrophic
- Edibility is unknown

Macrocybe titans (sometimes referred to as the "American Titan", or "Giant Gilled Mushroom") Is a species of edible mushroom native to Florida, Central and South America,

This mushroom was described as Tricholoma titans in 1980 by Howard E. Bigelow and J. W. Kimbrough, before being reclassified in Macrocybe in 1998.

== Description ==
Macrocybe titans form solid, large mushrooms that grow in clumps. The cap is from 8–50 centimetres (3.1–20 in) across, with rare specimens up to 100 centimetres (40 in) in diameter. Buff-ochre with a darker centre and greyish at the margins, and becoming white with age. The crowded white to pale grey or pale brown gills are sinuate and up to 2 cm thick. The cylindrical stout white stem is 6 to 15 centimetres (2.4 to 5.9 in) high and 1.5 to 4 centimetres (0.59 to 1.57 in) across with a swollen base up to 12 centimetres (4.7 in) in diameter. Rare specimens have stems up to 38 centimetres (15 in) high and 12.7 centimetres (5.0 in) wide.
