= Macrocybe lobayensis =

Scientific classification
- Domain: Eukaryota
- Kingdom: Fungi
- Division: Basidiomycota
- Class: Agaricomycetes
- Order: Agaricales
- Family: Callistosporiaceae
- Genus: Macrocybe
- Species: M. lobayensis

Binomial name
- Macrocybe lobayensis (R. Heim) Pegler & Lodge

Species of fungus

Macrocybe lobayensis is a species of mushroom that is native to west Africa.
