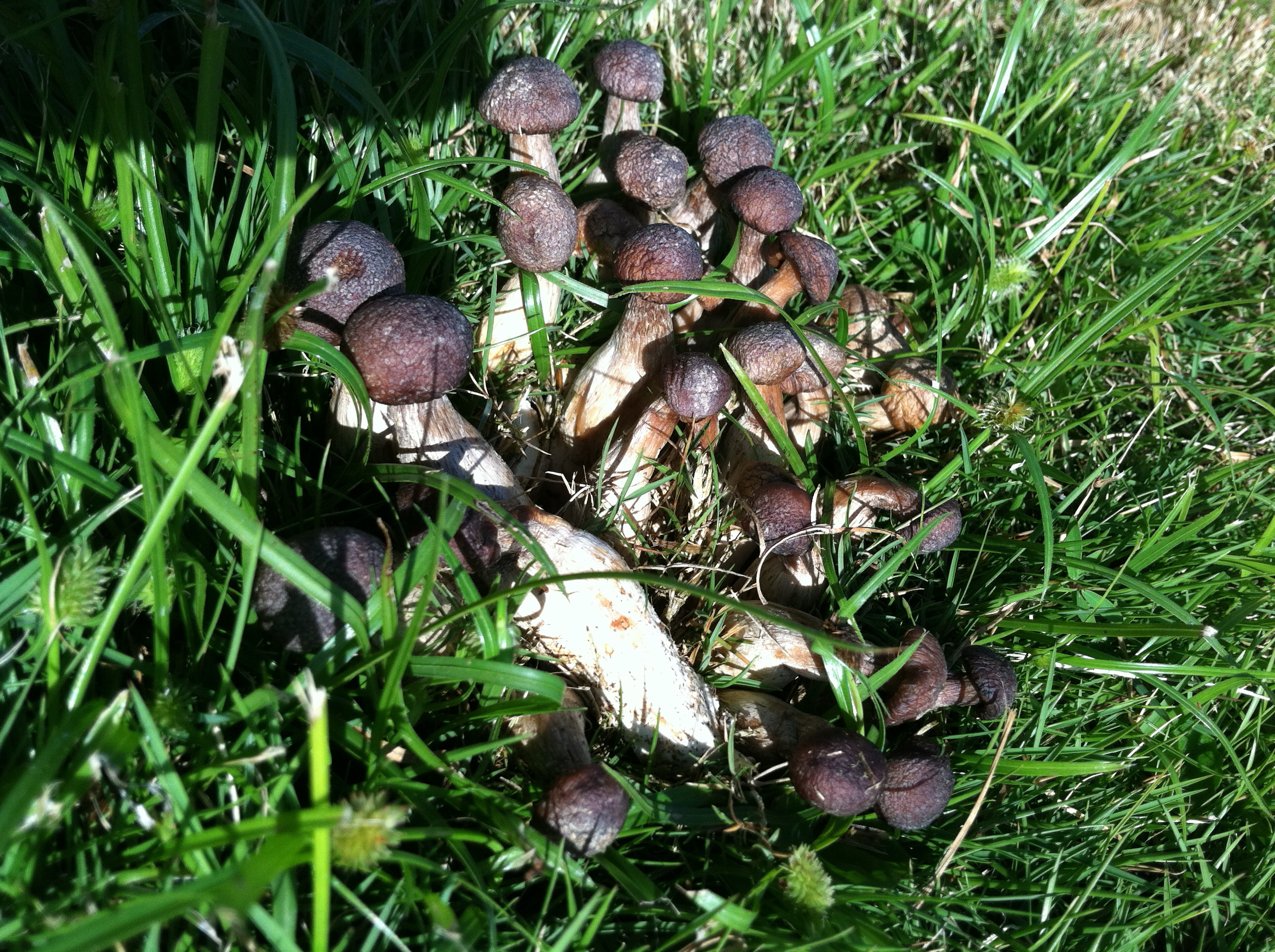

Scientific classification
- Domain: Eukaryota
- Kingdom: Fungi
- Division: Basidiomycota
- Class: Agaricomycetes
- Order: Agaricales
- Family: Callistosporiaceae
- Genus: Macrocybe
- Species: M. spectabilis

Binomial name
- Macrocybe spectabilis (Peerally & Sutra) Pegler & Lodge (1998)

Synonyms
- Tricholoma spectabile Peerally & Sutra (1973)

= Macrocybe spectabilis =

Species of fungus

Macrocybe spectabilis is a species of mushroom-forming fungus. It is found in Mauritius, Japan, and Hawaii. It is associated with sugarcane. It and Macrocybe titans contain large concentrations of cyanide. This mushroom is listed 食用 (edible) in the book きのこ ("Mushrooms") in the series "New Yama-Kei Pocket Guide."
