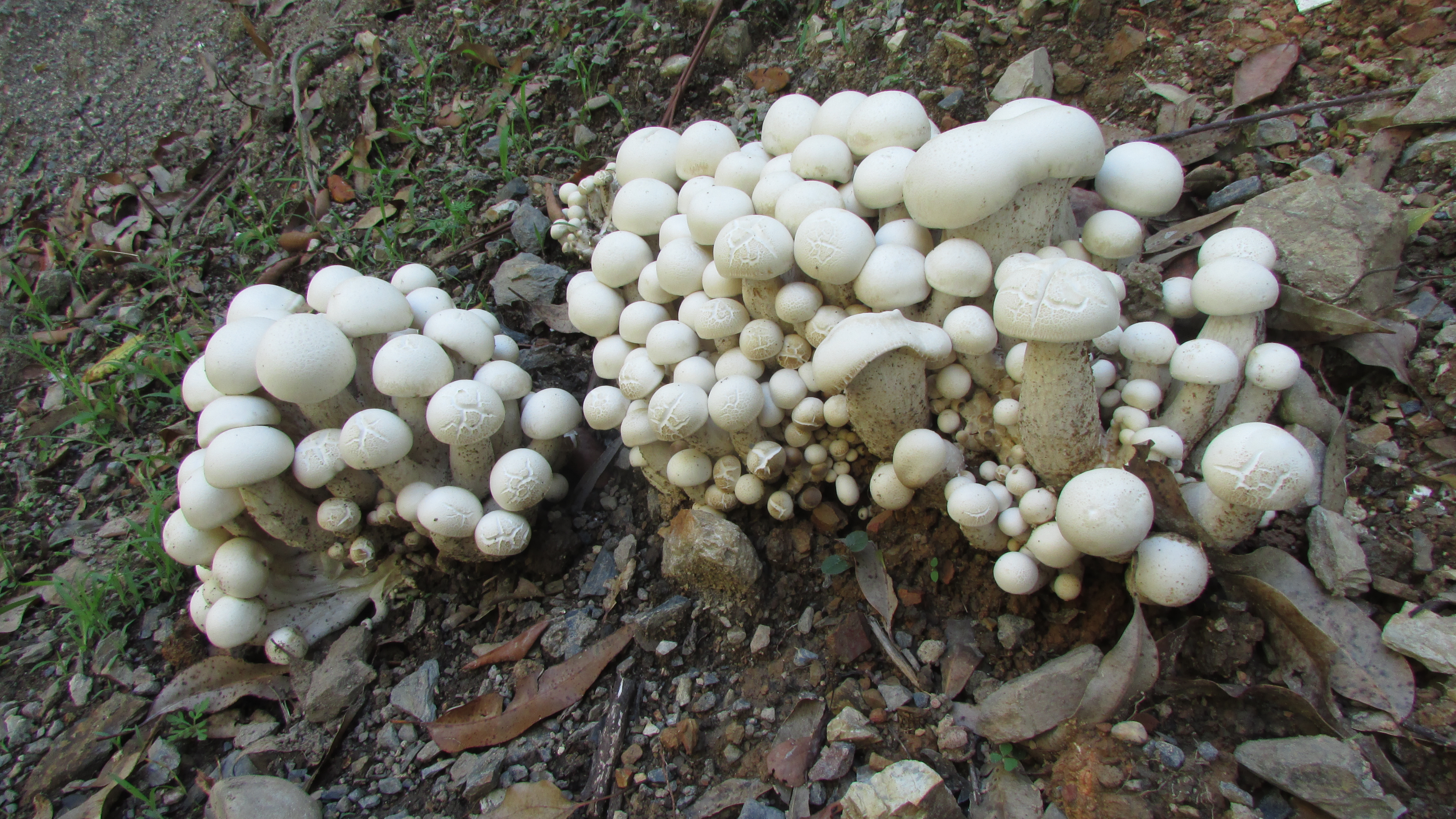
- Macrocybe

Scientific classification
- Kingdom: Fungi
- Division: Basidiomycota
- Class: Agaricomycetes
- Order: Agaricales
- Family: Callistosporiaceae
- Genus: Macrocybe; Pegler & Lodge (1998)

Type species
- Macrocybe titans (H.E.Bigelow & Kimbr.) Pegler, Lodge & Nakasone (1998)

Species
- M. crassa M. gigantea M. lobayensis M. pachymeres M. praegrandis M. sardoa M. spectabilis M. titans

= Macrocybe =

Genus of fungi

Macrocybe is a genus of fungi in the family Callistosporiaceae. Basidiocarps (fruit bodies) are agarics (gilled mushrooms) and were previously referred to Tricholoma, but are all large, whitish, and saprotrophic (Tricholoma species are ectomycorrhizal). Recent molecular research, based on cladistic analysis of DNA sequences, has shown that the genus is a natural, monophyletic grouping, though the status of several species is uncertain. Macrocybe species have a tropical to subtropical distribution.

The name is derived from the Ancient Greek words makros "long" and kube "head".

== Description ==
The species form huge, pale, fleshy fruit bodies that often grow in clumps on dead wood in the ground. The weight of the cluster may exceed 30 kg. The caps are convex to depressed, and sometimes have a central boss (umbo), and are white to cream or pale ochre or grey. One species, M. titans, has a cap that can reach a metre (40 in) in diameter. The white gills are sinuate. The flesh is white and does not change colour when bruised. The stipe is white and often has a swollen base. The spore print is white. The round to oval spores are less than 10 micrometres long and smooth.

== Habitat ==
The species are saprotrophic, generally growing on dead wood in grass. One species, M. gigantea, has been found growing on elephant dung in Kerala state in India, and M. crassa has been cultivated on horse manure in Thailand.

== Edibility ==
Several species are edible and eaten locally in Africa and southern Asia. An undescribed species is eaten by the Patamona people in Guyana. Although edible, some species do contain traces of cyanide that require cooking to eliminate.

== Species ==
Eight species have been described, though it is not yet clear that they are all distinct.

- M. crassa – Sri Lanka, India (Kerala), Malaysia, Thailand
- M. gigantea – India (West Bengal), Pakistan, Nepal
- M. lobayensis – West Africa
- M. pachymeres – Sri Lanka, India
- M. praegrandis – Brazil
- M. sardoa - Sardinia
- M. spectabilis – Mauritius, Japan, Hawaii
- M. titans – USA (Florida), Mexico, Caribbean, Central & South America

== See also ==
- List of Agaricales genera
