= Macrocybe pachymeres =

Scientific classification
- Domain: Eukaryota
- Kingdom: Fungi
- Division: Basidiomycota
- Class: Agaricomycetes
- Order: Agaricales
- Family: Callistosporiaceae
- Genus: Macrocybe
- Species: M. pachymeres

Binomial name
- Macrocybe pachymeres (Berk. & Broome) Pegler & Lodge

Species of fungus

Macrocybe pachymeres is a species of mushroom that is native to Sri Lanka and India.
