= Callistosporium palmarum =

Scientific classification
- Domain: Eukaryota
- Kingdom: Fungi
- Division: Basidiomycota
- Class: Agaricomycetes
- Order: Agaricales
- Family: Callistosporiaceae
- Genus: Callistosporium
- Species: C. palmarum

Binomial name
- Callistosporium palmarum (Murrill) Singer

Synonyms
- 1939 Gymnopus palmarum Murrill; 1939 Collybia palmarum (Murrill) Murrill

Species of fungus

Callistosporium palmarum is a species of fungus in the family Callistosporiaceae, and the type species of the genus Callistosporium. Originally named Gymnopus palmarum by William Alphonso Murrill in 1939, the species was transferred to the genus Callistosporium by Rolf Singer in 1944.
