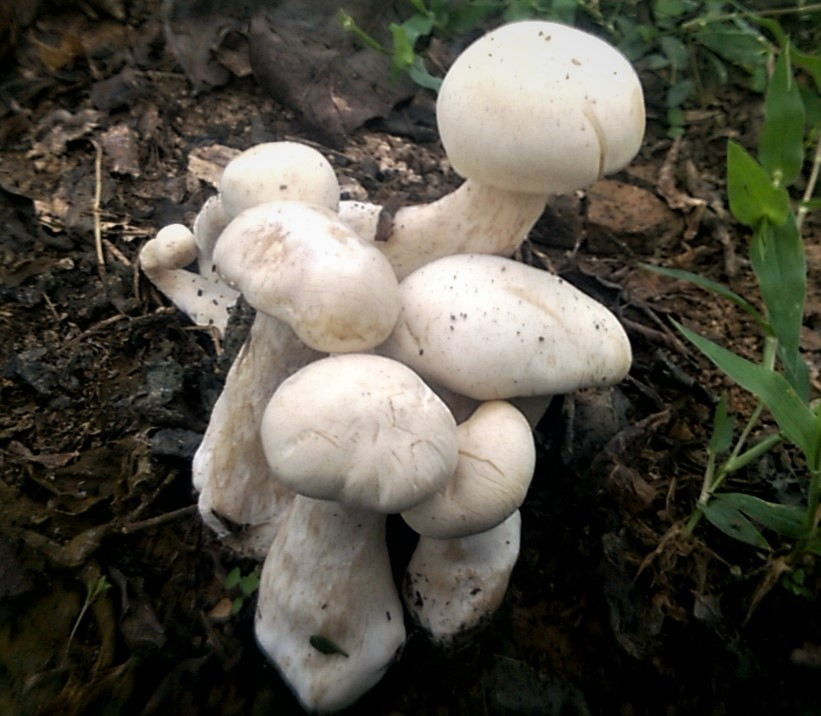

Scientific classification
- Domain: Eukaryota
- Kingdom: Fungi
- Division: Basidiomycota
- Class: Agaricomycetes
- Order: Agaricales
- Family: Callistosporiaceae
- Genus: Macrocybe
- Species: M. crassa

Binomial name
- Macrocybe crassa (Sacc.) Pegler & Lodge

Synonyms
- Tricholoma crassum Sacc.

= Macrocybe crassa =

Species of fungus

Macrocybe crassa is a species of fungus that is native to Sri Lanka, India (Kerala), Thailand and Malaysia. The large pale cream to brownish mushrooms can weigh up to 1.25 kg and have 40 cm diameter caps. They are widely consumed and highly regarded.

== Taxonomy ==
Miles Joseph Berkeley described this fungus as Agaricus crassus in 1847, calling it a "most magnificent species", from material collected in Peradeniya in Sri Lanka. However the name was illegitimate as the binomial had been used by Scopoli in 1772 for another fungus. Pier Andrea Saccardo placed it in the genus Tricholoma in 1887.

== Description ==
Macrocybe crassa form solid, large mushrooms that can weigh up to 1.25 kilograms (2.8 lb). The cap is from 14–24 centimetres (5.5–9.4 in) across, with rare specimens up to 40 centimetres (16 in) in diameter. Cream-white to yellow- or grey-brown with a darker centre, the cap is initially convex before expanding out and flattening, sometimes with a central boss. The crowded cream to white gills are adnexed to sinuate. The cylindrical stout white stem is 15 to 25 centimetres (5.9 to 9.8 in) high and 1.4 to 5 centimetres (0.55 to 1.97 in) across with a swollen base. The spore print is creamy white, and the oval spores are 5.0–6.5 μm long by 3.7–4.5 μm wide. The flesh is up to 3.5 centimetres (1.4 in) thick under the cap and has a hint of bitterness.

It can be distinguished from the related M. gigantea by the latter species' yellow gills and lack of swollen base to its stalk.

== Distribution and habitat ==
It is native to Sri Lanka, India (Kerala), Thailand and Malaysia. It is highly regarded in Thailand but expensive as it is generally only available after the rainy season. It can be cultivated on sawdust of rubber trees, however.

== Edibility ==
M. crassa mushrooms are cooked in mustard oil and spices in West Bengal. They are known in Bengali as dhoodh chhatu, from the word for "milk" as they are said to smell like milk when dried.
