= Macrocybe praegrandis =

Scientific classification
- Domain: Eukaryota
- Kingdom: Fungi
- Division: Basidiomycota
- Class: Agaricomycetes
- Order: Agaricales
- Family: Callistosporiaceae
- Genus: Macrocybe
- Species: M. praegrandis

Binomial name
- Macrocybe praegrandis (Berk.) Pegler & Lodge

Species of fungus

Macrocybe praegrandis is a species of mushroom that is native to Brazil.
