= Callistosporium vinosobrunneum =

Conservation status
- Vulnerable (IUCN 3.1)

Scientific classification
- Kingdom: Fungi
- Division: Basidiomycota
- Class: Agaricomycetes
- Order: Agaricales
- Family: Callistosporiaceae
- Genus: Callistosporium
- Species: C. vinosobrunneum

Binomial name
- Callistosporium vinosobrunneum Desjardin & Hemmes (2011)
- known only from Hawaiʻi

Species of fungus

Callistosporium vinosobrunneum Mycological characteristics
- Gills on hymenium
- Cap is convex or flat
- Hymenium is adnexed or sinuate
- Stipe is bare
- Ecology is saprotrophic
- Edibility is unknown

Callistosporium vinosobrunneum is a species of agaric fungus in the family Callistosporiaceae. Newly described to science in 2011, it is known only from Hawaiian montane wet forests on the islands of Hawaiʻi and Kauaʻi.

== Taxonomy ==
The species was first described scientifically by mycologists Dennis Desjardin and Don Hemmes in 2011 in Mycologia. Desjardin collected the holotype specimen in Kauaʻi, in Kōkeʻe State Park in January 2009. The specific epithet vinosobrunneum refers to the dark reddish-brown color of the fruit bodies.

== Description ==
The shape of the cap is convex to flattened, and it is translucent with slight grooves, reaching a diameter of 14–20 mm (0.55–0.79 in). The cap surface is smooth, moist, and hygrophanous. Dark reddish-brown near the center, the color fades slightly approaching the margin. The flesh is thin—between 0.5 and 1 mm—and pale grayish to reddish brown. The gills are adnexed or sinuate, seceding in maturity. They are somewhat distantly spaced, with two to four series of interspersed lamellulae (short gills). The gills are reddish brown, and may have a lavender tint. The stem, which is roughly the same color as the cap, measures 2.5 to 3.0 cm (1.0 to 1.2 in) long by 2–2.5 mm thick, and is either more or less equal in width throughout its length or is slightly enlarged in the lower part. The mushroom lacks any distinctive taste or odor.

The spores are ovoid (egg-shaped), smooth, hyaline (translucent), thin-walled, and contain one oil droplet; they measure 6.5–8 by 5–6.5 μm. The basidia (spore-bearing cells) are club-shaped, four-spored with sterigma that are 2.5–5 μm long, and measure 27–36 by 8–10 μm.

== Distribution and habitat ==
Callistosporium vinosobrunneum grows solitarily to scattered on the rotting wood of the flowering evergreen tree ʻōhiʻa lehua (Metrosideros polymorpha). It is endemic to the islands of Hawaiʻi and Kauaʻi.
