= Callistosporium elegans =

Scientific classification
- Kingdom: Fungi
- Division: Basidiomycota
- Class: Agaricomycetes
- Order: Agaricales
- Family: Callistosporiaceae
- Genus: Callistosporium
- Species: C. elegans

Binomial name
- Callistosporium elegans Desjardin & B.A. Perry, 2017

Species of fungus

Callistosporium elegans is a species of fungus known from São Tomé and Príncipe.
