= Macrocybe gigantea =

Scientific classification
- Domain: Eukaryota
- Kingdom: Fungi
- Division: Basidiomycota
- Class: Agaricomycetes
- Order: Agaricales
- Family: Callistosporiaceae
- Genus: Macrocybe
- Species: M. gigantea

Binomial name
- Macrocybe gigantea (Massee) Pegler & Lodge (1998)

Species of fungus

Macrocybe gigantea is a species of mushroom-forming fungus that is native to India (West Bengal), Pakistan, and Nepal.

== Taxonomy ==
The English botanist George Edward Massee described this species as Tricholoma giganteum in 1912 from material collected in Shyamnagar, West Bengal, by Ethel Maud Burkill in 1911. Tricholoma was a wastebasket taxon; the species was moved into the new genus Macrocybe in 1998. Specimens currently classified as M. gigantea from Pakistan and China were more closely related to each other than specimens from India.

== Description ==
The mushroom has a smooth cap that is conical when young before expanding flattening out and can reach 30–35 cm in diameter. It is variable in colour, initially white before ageing to light grey, paler at the margin. The crowded sinuate gills are yellow. The cylindrical stipe is 15–18 cm high by 6 cm wide and is the same colour as the cap. The firm white flesh is up to 3 cm thick under the cap. The spore print is white. The oval spores measure 5.7–7.5 μm long by 4.0–5.3 μm wide.

== Ecology ==
In West Bengal, M. gigantea grows in groups or sometimes fairy rings in shady or grassy areas, or in association with angiosperm trees. M. gigantea has been found growing on elephant dung in Kerala state in India.

== Relationship with humans ==
Known locally as Boro dhoodh chhatu, roughly translated as "smells like milk when dried", M. gigantea is picked and sold at roadside markets in central and coastal West Bengal and cooked in mustard oil and spices. In Tripura, the local Tripuri people also collect and eat this mushroom. M. gigantea is able to be cultivated, with investigations showing that pearl millet (Cenchrus americanus) is a promising substrate.
