= Pleurocollybia =

Scientific classification
- Kingdom: Fungi
- Division: Basidiomycota
- Class: Agaricomycetes
- Order: Agaricales
- Family: Callistosporiaceae
- Genus: Pleurocollybia; Singer (1947)

Type species
- Pleurocollybia praemultifolia (Murrill) Singer (1947)

Genus of fungi

Pleurocollybia is a genus of fungi in the family Callistosporiaceae. Basidiocarps (fruit bodies) are pleurotoid (gilled mushrooms with lateral stems) and grow on wood. DNA research has shown that the type species, P. praemultifolia belongs in the genus Callistosporium, making Pleurocollybia a synonym. Not all species have been investigated, however, and it is not clear that every Pleurocollybia species belongs in Callistosporium. Pleurocollybia cibaria has, for example, been transferred to the genus Gerhardtia.
