= Macrocybe sardoa =

Scientific classification
- Kingdom: Fungi
- Division: Basidiomycota
- Class: Agaricomycetes
- Order: Agaricales
- Family: Callistosporiaceae
- Genus: Macrocybe
- Species: M. sardoa

Binomial name
- Macrocybe sardoa Vizzini, Consiglio, & M. Marchetti, 2020

Species of fungus

Macrocybe sardoa is a species of mushroom-forming fungus that belongs to the family Callistosporiaceae. The species epithet refers to Sardinia, where the original specimen was collected.

Though originally thought to only be in Italy, it was also discovered in India.
