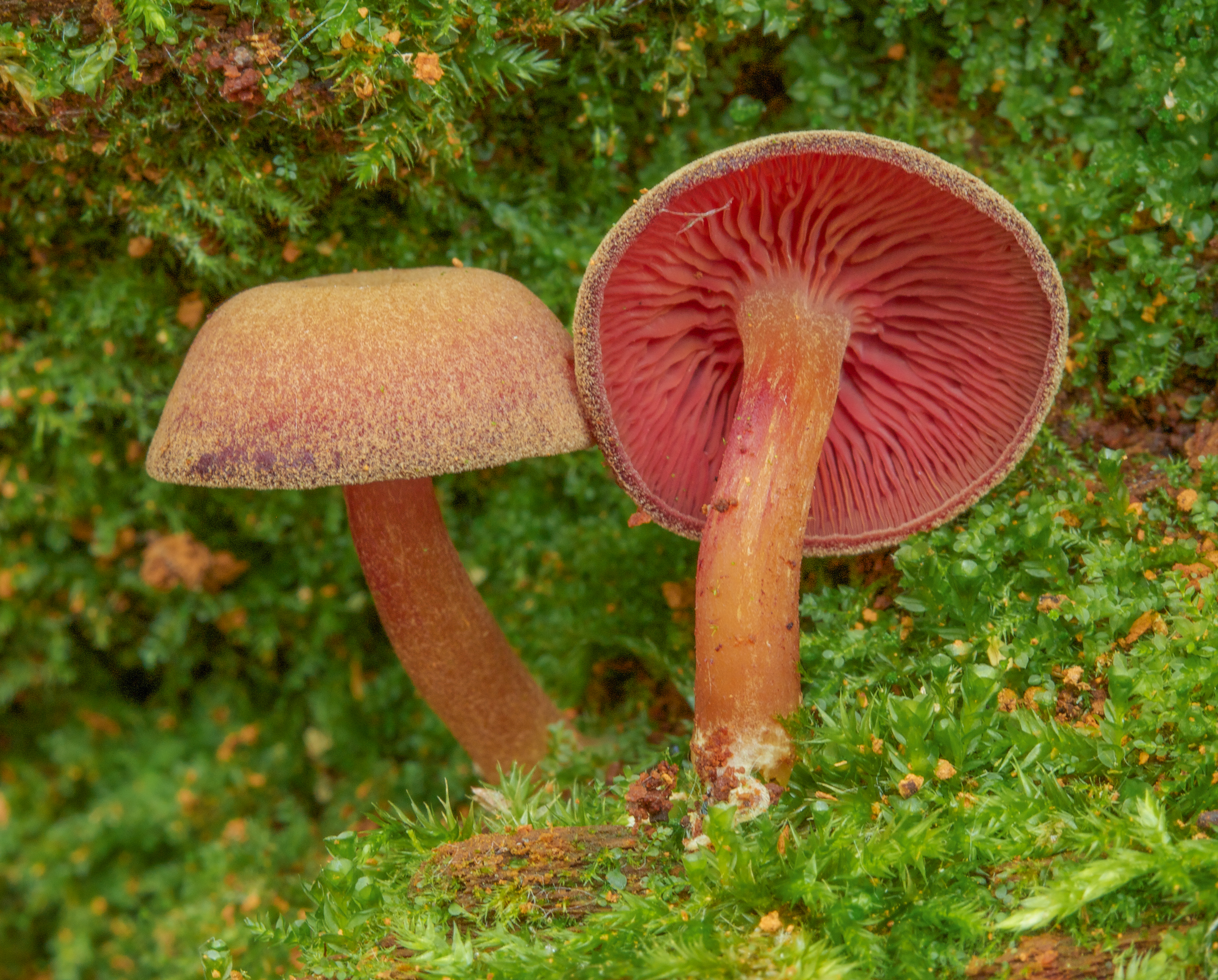

Scientific classification
- Kingdom: Fungi
- Division: Basidiomycota
- Class: Agaricomycetes
- Order: Agaricales
- Family: Callistosporiaceae
- Genus: Callistosporium
- Species: C. purpureomarginatum

Binomial name
- Callistosporium purpureomarginatum Fatto & Bessette (1996)

= Callistosporium purpureomarginatum =

Species of fungus

Callistosporium purpureomarginatum
- Mycological characteristics
- Gills on hymenium
- Cap is convex or flat
- Hymenium is adnate
- Stipe is bare
- Spore print is white
- Ecology is saprotrophic
- Edibility is unknown

Callistosporium purpureomarginatum is a species of agaric fungus in the family Callistosporiaceae. Found in the United States, it was officially described in 1996.

== Taxonomy ==
C. purpureomarginatum was classified by the mycologists Raymond M. Fatto and Alan E. Bessette in 1996.

== Description ==
Callistosporium purpureomarginatum is a small mushroom with a distinctive purplish red cap which discolours at it ages or dries.

Cap: 1-4cm. Starts convex before flattening with age. Stem: 1.5-4cm in height and 2-5mm in thickness. Gills: Purple brown, discolouring to yellow or olive whilst sometimes retaining purple fringes. Spore print: White. Spores: Smooth, ellipsoid. 4.7 x 2.5-4 μm. Taste: Indistinct or bitter. Smell: Indistinct.
