= Micropholis madeirensis =

Conservation status
- Near Threatened (IUCN 2.3)

Scientific classification
- Kingdom: Plantae
- Clade: Tracheophytes
- Clade: Angiosperms
- Clade: Eudicots
- Clade: Asterids
- Order: Ericales
- Family: Sapotaceae
- Genus: Micropholis
- Species: M. madeirensis

Binomial name
- Micropholis madeirensis (Baehni) Aubrév.

Species of tree

Micropholis madeirensis is a species of plant in the family Sapotaceae. It is found in Brazil and Peru.
