= Micropholis polita =

Conservation status
- Vulnerable (IUCN 2.3)

Scientific classification
- Kingdom: Plantae
- Clade: Tracheophytes
- Clade: Angiosperms
- Clade: Eudicots
- Clade: Asterids
- Order: Ericales
- Family: Sapotaceae
- Genus: Micropholis
- Species: M. polita

Binomial name
- Micropholis polita (Griseb.) Pierre

Synonyms
- Pouteria polita (Griseb.) Baehni; Sapota polita Griseb.; Sideroxylon politum (Griseb.) Pierre

Species of flowering plant

Micropholis polita is a species of plant in the family Sapotaceae. It is native to eastern Cuba and Haiti. It is threatened by habitat loss.

Two subspecies have been named:

- Micropholis polita subsp. hotteana Judd – Haiti
- Micropholis polita subsp. polita – eastern Cuba
