= Micropholis cayennensis =

Conservation status
- Least Concern (IUCN 2.3)

Scientific classification
- Kingdom: Plantae
- Clade: Tracheophytes
- Clade: Angiosperms
- Clade: Eudicots
- Clade: Asterids
- Order: Ericales
- Family: Sapotaceae
- Genus: Micropholis
- Species: M. cayennensis

Binomial name
- Micropholis cayennensis T.D.Penn.

Synonyms
- Micropholis cayennesis T.D.Penn. [orth. error]

Species of flowering plant

Micropholis cayennensis is a species of plant in the family Sapotaceae. It is found in Brazil and French Guiana.
