= Myelobia =

Scientific classification
- Kingdom: Animalia
- Phylum: Arthropoda
- Class: Insecta
- Order: Lepidoptera
- Family: Crambidae
- Subfamily: Crambinae
- Tribe: Chiloini
- Genus: Myelobia; Herrich-Schäffer, 1854

Synonyms
- Chilopsis Hampson, 1919; Doratoperas Hampson, 1896; Protaphomia Meyrick, 1936; Xanthopherne Dyar & Heinrich, 1927

Genus of moths

Myelobia is a genus of moths of the family Crambidae.

== Species ==
- Myelobia atrosparsellus (Walker, 1863)
- Myelobia bimaculata (Box, 1931)
- Myelobia biumbrata (Schaus, 1922)
- Myelobia castrellus (Schaus, 1922)
- Myelobia decolorata Herrich-Schäffer, [1854]
- Myelobia dorsipunctellus (Schaus, 1922)
- Myelobia endothermalis (Hampson, 1919)
- Myelobia haplodoxa (Meyrick, 1936) (from Brazil)
- Myelobia heinrichi (Box, 1931)
- Myelobia incanella (Hampson, 1896)
- Myelobia lanceolatus (Zeller, 1881)
- Myelobia nabalalis (Schaus, 1934)
- Myelobia nigristigmellus (Hampson, 1896)
- Myelobia parnahyba (Schaus, 1934)
- Myelobia smerintha (Hübner, 1821)
- Myelobia spectabilis (C. Felder, R. Felder & Rogenhofer, 1875)
- Myelobia squamata (Hampson, 1919)
- Myelobia systrapegus (Dyar, 1913)
- Myelobia vinasella (Schaus, 1913)
- Myelobia zeuzeroides Walker, 1865
