= Micropholis garciniifolia =

Conservation status
- Near Threatened (IUCN 2.3)

Scientific classification
- Kingdom: Plantae
- Clade: Tracheophytes
- Clade: Angiosperms
- Clade: Eudicots
- Clade: Asterids
- Order: Ericales
- Family: Sapotaceae
- Genus: Micropholis
- Species: M. garciniifolia

Binomial name
- Micropholis garciniifolia Pierre (1891)

Synonyms
- Micropholis urbanii Pierre (1891); Pouteria garciniifolia Baehni (1942)

Species of plant

Micropholis garciniifolia is a species of plant in the family Sapotaceae. It is endemic to Puerto Rico, where it is known as caimitillo verde. It is becoming rare due to habitat loss.
