= Myelobia lanceolatus =

Scientific classification
- Kingdom: Animalia
- Phylum: Arthropoda
- Clade: Pancrustacea
- Class: Insecta
- Order: Lepidoptera
- Family: Crambidae
- Subfamily: Crambinae
- Tribe: Chiloini
- Genus: Myelobia
- Species: M. lanceolatus

Binomial name
- Myelobia lanceolatus (Zeller, 1881)

Synonyms
- Donacoscaptes lanceolatus Zeller, 1881

Species of moth

Myelobia lanceolatus is a moth in the family Crambidae. It is found in Colombia.
