= Micropholis oppositifolia =

Conservation status
- Vulnerable (IUCN 2.3)

Scientific classification
- Kingdom: Plantae
- Clade: Tracheophytes
- Clade: Angiosperms
- Clade: Eudicots
- Clade: Asterids
- Order: Ericales
- Family: Sapotaceae
- Genus: Micropholis
- Species: M. oppositifolia

Binomial name
- Micropholis oppositifolia (Ducke) Swenson

Synonyms
- Planchonella oppositifolia (Ducke) P.Royen; Pouteria oppositifolia (Ducke) Baehni; Syzygiopsis oppositifolia Ducke

Species of flowering plant

Micropholis oppositifolia is a species of plant in the family Sapotaceae. It is a tree endemic to the states of Pará and Amapá in northern Brazil, where it is known as abiurana. It grows in lowland rainforest, where it is threatened by habitat loss from deforestation.
