= Micropholis macrophylla =

Conservation status
- Critically Endangered (IUCN 2.3)

Scientific classification
- Kingdom: Plantae
- Clade: Tracheophytes
- Clade: Angiosperms
- Clade: Eudicots
- Clade: Asterids
- Order: Ericales
- Family: Sapotaceae
- Genus: Micropholis
- Species: M. macrophylla

Binomial name
- Micropholis macrophylla (K.Krause) T.D.Penn.

Synonyms
- Lucuma macrophylla K.Krause; Pouteria peruviana Baehni

Species of tree

Micropholis macrophylla is a species of flowering plant in the family Sapotaceae. It is endemic to Peru.
