= Myelobia heinrichi =

Scientific classification
- Kingdom: Animalia
- Phylum: Arthropoda
- Clade: Pancrustacea
- Class: Insecta
- Order: Lepidoptera
- Family: Crambidae
- Subfamily: Crambinae
- Tribe: Chiloini
- Genus: Myelobia
- Species: M. heinrichi

Binomial name
- Myelobia heinrichi (Box, 1931)

Synonyms
- Xanthopherne heinrichi Box, 1931

Species of moth

Myelobia heinrichi is a moth in the family Crambidae. It is found in Peru.
