= Micropholis retusa =

Conservation status
- Endangered (IUCN 2.3)

Scientific classification
- Kingdom: Plantae
- Clade: Tracheophytes
- Clade: Angiosperms
- Clade: Eudicots
- Clade: Asterids
- Order: Ericales
- Family: Sapotaceae
- Genus: Micropholis
- Species: M. retusa

Binomial name
- Micropholis retusa (Spruce ex Miq.) Eyma

Species of flowering plant

Micropholis retusa is a species of plant in the family Sapotaceae. It is endemic to Brazil. It is threatened by habitat loss.
