= Micropholis humboldtiana =

Conservation status
- Near Threatened (IUCN 2.3)

Scientific classification
- Kingdom: Plantae
- Clade: Embryophytes
- Clade: Tracheophytes
- Clade: Spermatophytes
- Clade: Angiosperms
- Clade: Eudicots
- Clade: Asterids
- Order: Ericales
- Family: Sapotaceae
- Genus: Micropholis
- Species: M. humboldtiana

Binomial name
- Micropholis humboldtiana (Roem. & Schult.) T.D.Penn.

Species of flowering plant

Micropholis humboldtiana is a species of plant in the family Sapotaceae. It is found in Brazil and Venezuela.
