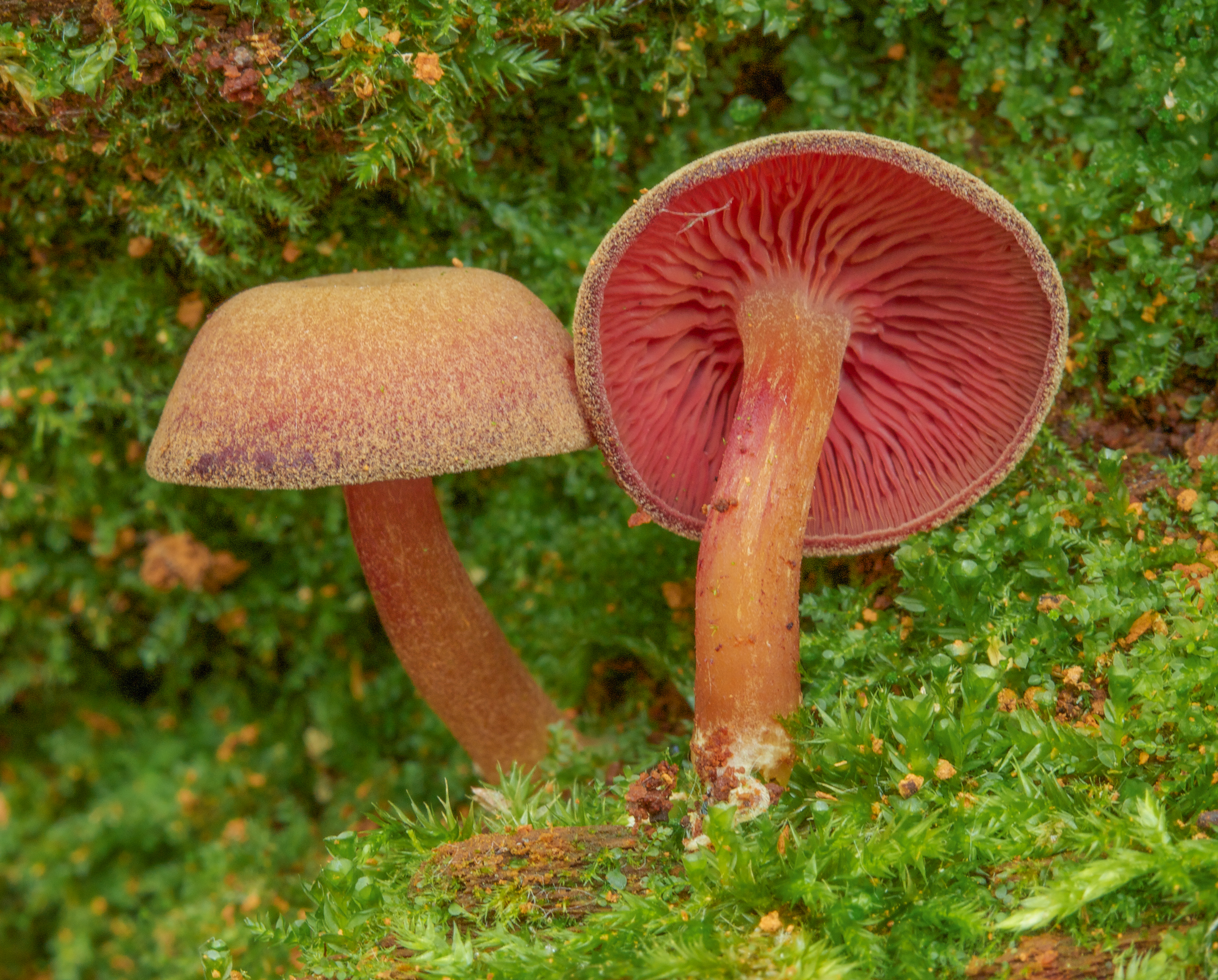
- Callistosporium purpureomarginatum, USA

Scientific classification
- Domain: Eukaryota
- Kingdom: Fungi
- Division: Basidiomycota
- Class: Agaricomycetes
- Order: Agaricales
- Family: Callistosporiaceae
- Genus: Callistosporium; Singer (1944)

Type species
- Callistosporium palmarum (Murrill) Singer (1944)

Synonyms
- Pleurocollybia Singer (1947)

= Callistosporium =

Genus of fungi

Callistosporium is a genus of fungi in the order Agaricales. Basidiocarps (fruit bodies) are agarics (gilled mushrooms), either with a central stipe (stalk) or pleurotoid (with a lateral stipe). The latter group were formerly referred to Pleurocollybia. Recent molecular research, based on cladistic analysis of DNA sequences, has shown that the genus is a natural, monophyletic grouping, though not all species have yet been sequenced. Species are saprotrophic, typically growing on wood, and the genus is found worldwide.

== Species ==
- C. amazonicum
- C. brunescens
- C. chrysophorum
- C. elaeodes
- C. elegans
- C. foetens
- C. galerinoides
- C. heimii
- C. hesleri
- C. imbricatum
- C. krambrukum
- C. luteo-olivaceum
- C. marginatum
- C. palmarum
- C. pinicola
- C. praemultifolium
- C. purpureomarginatum
- C. terrigenum
- C. vinosobrunneum
- C. xerampelinum
