= Myelobia squamata =

Scientific classification
- Kingdom: Animalia
- Phylum: Arthropoda
- Clade: Pancrustacea
- Class: Insecta
- Order: Lepidoptera
- Family: Crambidae
- Subfamily: Crambinae
- Tribe: Chiloini
- Genus: Myelobia
- Species: M. squamata

Binomial name
- Myelobia squamata (Hampson, 1919)

Synonyms
- Chilopsis squamata Hampson, 1919

Species of moth

Myelobia squamata is a moth in the family Crambidae. It is found in Peru. It is nocturnal.
