= Myelobia atrosparsellus =

Scientific classification
- Kingdom: Animalia
- Phylum: Arthropoda
- Clade: Pancrustacea
- Class: Insecta
- Order: Lepidoptera
- Family: Crambidae
- Subfamily: Crambinae
- Tribe: Chiloini
- Genus: Myelobia
- Species: M. atrosparsellus

Binomial name
- Myelobia atrosparsellus (Walker, 1863)

Synonyms
- Crambus atrosparsellus Walker, 1863; Morpheis atrosparsellus; Doratoperas atrosparsellus

Species of moth

Myelobia atrosparsellus is a moth in the family Crambidae. It is found in Brazil and Colombia.
