= Myelobia systrapegus =

Scientific classification
- Kingdom: Animalia
- Phylum: Arthropoda
- Clade: Pancrustacea
- Class: Insecta
- Order: Lepidoptera
- Family: Crambidae
- Subfamily: Crambinae
- Tribe: Chiloini
- Genus: Myelobia
- Species: M. systrapegus

Binomial name
- Myelobia systrapegus (Dyar, 1913)

Synonyms
- Doratoperas systrapegus Dyar, 1913

Species of moth

Myelobia systrapegus is a moth in the family Crambidae. It was described by Harrison Gray Dyar Jr. in 1913. It is found in Mexico.
