= Micropholis resinifera =

Conservation status
- Vulnerable (IUCN 2.3)

Scientific classification
- Kingdom: Plantae
- Clade: Tracheophytes
- Clade: Angiosperms
- Clade: Eudicots
- Clade: Asterids
- Order: Ericales
- Family: Sapotaceae
- Genus: Micropholis
- Species: M. resinifera

Binomial name
- Micropholis resinifera (Ducke) Eyma

Synonyms
- Pouteria resinifera (Ducke) Baehni; Sideroxylon resiniferum Ducke

Species of flowering plant

Micropholis resinifera is a species of plant in the family Sapotaceae. It is endemic to Brazil. It is threatened by habitat loss.
