= Myelobia biumbrata =

Scientific classification
- Kingdom: Animalia
- Phylum: Arthropoda
- Clade: Pancrustacea
- Class: Insecta
- Order: Lepidoptera
- Family: Crambidae
- Subfamily: Crambinae
- Tribe: Chiloini
- Genus: Myelobia
- Species: M. biumbrata

Binomial name
- Myelobia biumbrata (Schaus, 1922)

Synonyms
- Doratoperas biumbrata Schaus, 1922

Species of moth

Myelobia biumbrata is a moth in the family Crambidae. It was described by Schaus in 1922. It is found in Guatemala.
