= Myelobia incanella =

Scientific classification
- Kingdom: Animalia
- Phylum: Arthropoda
- Clade: Pancrustacea
- Class: Insecta
- Order: Lepidoptera
- Family: Crambidae
- Subfamily: Crambinae
- Tribe: Chiloini
- Genus: Myelobia
- Species: M. incanella

Binomial name
- Myelobia incanella (Hampson, 1896)

Synonyms
- Chilo incanella Hampson, 1896

Species of moth

Myelobia incanella is a moth in the family Crambidae. It is found in Brazil (Parana).
