= Micropholis suborbicularis =

Conservation status
- Near Threatened (IUCN 2.3)

Scientific classification
- Kingdom: Plantae
- Clade: Tracheophytes
- Clade: Angiosperms
- Clade: Eudicots
- Clade: Asterids
- Order: Ericales
- Family: Sapotaceae
- Genus: Micropholis
- Species: M. suborbicularis

Binomial name
- Micropholis suborbicularis Aubrév.

Species of flowering plant

Micropholis suborbicularis is a species of plant in the family Sapotaceae. It is endemic to Venezuela.
