= Micropholis compta =

Conservation status
- Vulnerable (IUCN 2.3)

Scientific classification
- Kingdom: Plantae
- Clade: Tracheophytes
- Clade: Angiosperms
- Clade: Eudicots
- Clade: Asterids
- Order: Ericales
- Family: Sapotaceae
- Genus: Micropholis
- Species: M. compta

Binomial name
- Micropholis compta Pierre in I.Urban

Species of tree

Micropholis compta is a species of plant in the family Sapotaceae. The plant is endemic to the Atlantic Forest ecoregion in southeastern Brazil. It is an IUCN Red List Vulnerable species.
