= Myelobia zeuzeroides =

Scientific classification
- Kingdom: Animalia
- Phylum: Arthropoda
- Clade: Pancrustacea
- Class: Insecta
- Order: Lepidoptera
- Family: Crambidae
- Subfamily: Crambinae
- Tribe: Chiloini
- Genus: Myelobia
- Species: M. zeuzeroides

Binomial name
- Myelobia zeuzeroides Walker, 1865

Species of moth

Myelobia zeuzeroides is a moth in the family Crambidae. It is found in Brazil (Ega).
