= Myelobia decolorata =

Scientific classification
- Kingdom: Animalia
- Phylum: Arthropoda
- Clade: Pancrustacea
- Class: Insecta
- Order: Lepidoptera
- Family: Crambidae
- Subfamily: Crambinae
- Tribe: Chiloini
- Genus: Myelobia
- Species: M. decolorata

Binomial name
- Myelobia decolorata (Herrich-Schäffer, 1858)

Synonyms
- Morpheis decolorata; Xyleutes decolorata

Species of moth

Myelobia decolorata is a moth in the family Crambidae. It is found in Colombia, Venezuela and Brazil.
