= Myelobia endothermalis =

Scientific classification
- Kingdom: Animalia
- Phylum: Arthropoda
- Clade: Pancrustacea
- Class: Insecta
- Order: Lepidoptera
- Family: Crambidae
- Subfamily: Crambinae
- Tribe: Chiloini
- Genus: Myelobia
- Species: M. endothermalis

Binomial name
- Myelobia endothermalis (Hampson, 1919)

Synonyms
- Diatraea endothermalis Hampson, 1919

Species of moth

Myelobia endothermalis is a moth in the family Crambidae. It is found in Peru.
