= Myelobia nabalalis =

Scientific classification
- Kingdom: Animalia
- Phylum: Arthropoda
- Clade: Pancrustacea
- Class: Insecta
- Order: Lepidoptera
- Family: Crambidae
- Subfamily: Crambinae
- Tribe: Chiloini
- Genus: Myelobia
- Species: M. nabalalis

Binomial name
- Myelobia nabalalis (Schaus, 1934)

Synonyms
- Doratoperas nabalalis Schaus, 1934

Species of moth

Myelobia nabalalis is a moth in the family Crambidae. It was described by Schaus in 1934. It is found in Brazil (Rio de Janeiro).
