= Micropholis venamoensis =

Conservation status
- Vulnerable (IUCN 2.3)

Scientific classification
- Kingdom: Plantae
- Clade: Tracheophytes
- Clade: Angiosperms
- Clade: Eudicots
- Clade: Asterids
- Order: Ericales
- Family: Sapotaceae
- Genus: Micropholis
- Species: M. venamoensis

Binomial name
- Micropholis venamoensis (Steyerm.) T.D.Penn.

Species of shrub

Micropholis venamoensis is a species of plant in the family Sapotaceae. It is a leafy evergreen shrub that is endemic to Venezuela. It has recently been placed on the list of threatened species.
