= Myelobia smerintha =

Scientific classification
- Kingdom: Animalia
- Phylum: Arthropoda
- Clade: Pancrustacea
- Class: Insecta
- Order: Lepidoptera
- Family: Crambidae
- Subfamily: Crambinae
- Tribe: Chiloini
- Genus: Myelobia
- Species: M. smerintha

Binomial name
- Myelobia smerintha (Hübner, 1821)

Synonyms
- Morpheis smerintha Hübner, 1821; Morpheis smerinthea var. alba Köhler, 1924; Myelobia murina Herrich-Schäffer, [1854]; Myelobia paleacea Herrich-Schäffer, [1854]; Myelobia pustulata Herrich-Schäffer, [1858]; Morpheis smerinthea Köhler, 1924

Species of moth

Myelobia smerintha is a moth in the family Crambidae. It is found in Argentina.
