= Micropholis sanctae-rosae =

Conservation status
- Least Concern (IUCN 2.3)

Scientific classification
- Kingdom: Plantae
- Clade: Tracheophytes
- Clade: Angiosperms
- Clade: Eudicots
- Clade: Asterids
- Order: Ericales
- Family: Sapotaceae
- Genus: Micropholis
- Species: M. sanctae-rosae

Binomial name
- Micropholis sanctae-rosae (Baehni) T.D.Penn.

Species of tree

Micropholis sanctae-rosae is a species of plant in the family Sapotaceae. It is found in Brazil, French Guiana, and Peru.
