= Micropholis caudata =

Conservation status
- Critically Endangered (IUCN 2.3)

Scientific classification
- Kingdom: Plantae
- Clade: Tracheophytes
- Clade: Angiosperms
- Clade: Eudicots
- Clade: Asterids
- Order: Ericales
- Family: Sapotaceae
- Genus: Micropholis
- Species: M. caudata

Binomial name
- Micropholis caudata T.D.Penn.

Species of flowering plant

Micropholis caudata is a species of plant in the family Sapotaceae.

It is endemic to non-flooded Amazonian forest habitat, in Amazonas state of the Amazon region and northeastern Brazil.

It is a Critically endangered species on the IUCN Red List.
