= Myelobia castrellus =

Scientific classification
- Kingdom: Animalia
- Phylum: Arthropoda
- Clade: Pancrustacea
- Class: Insecta
- Order: Lepidoptera
- Family: Crambidae
- Subfamily: Crambinae
- Tribe: Chiloini
- Genus: Myelobia
- Species: M. castrellus

Binomial name
- Myelobia castrellus (Schaus, 1922)

Synonyms
- Chilopsis castrellus Schaus, 1922

Species of moth

Myelobia castrellus is a moth in the family Crambidae. It is found in Brazil (Parana).
