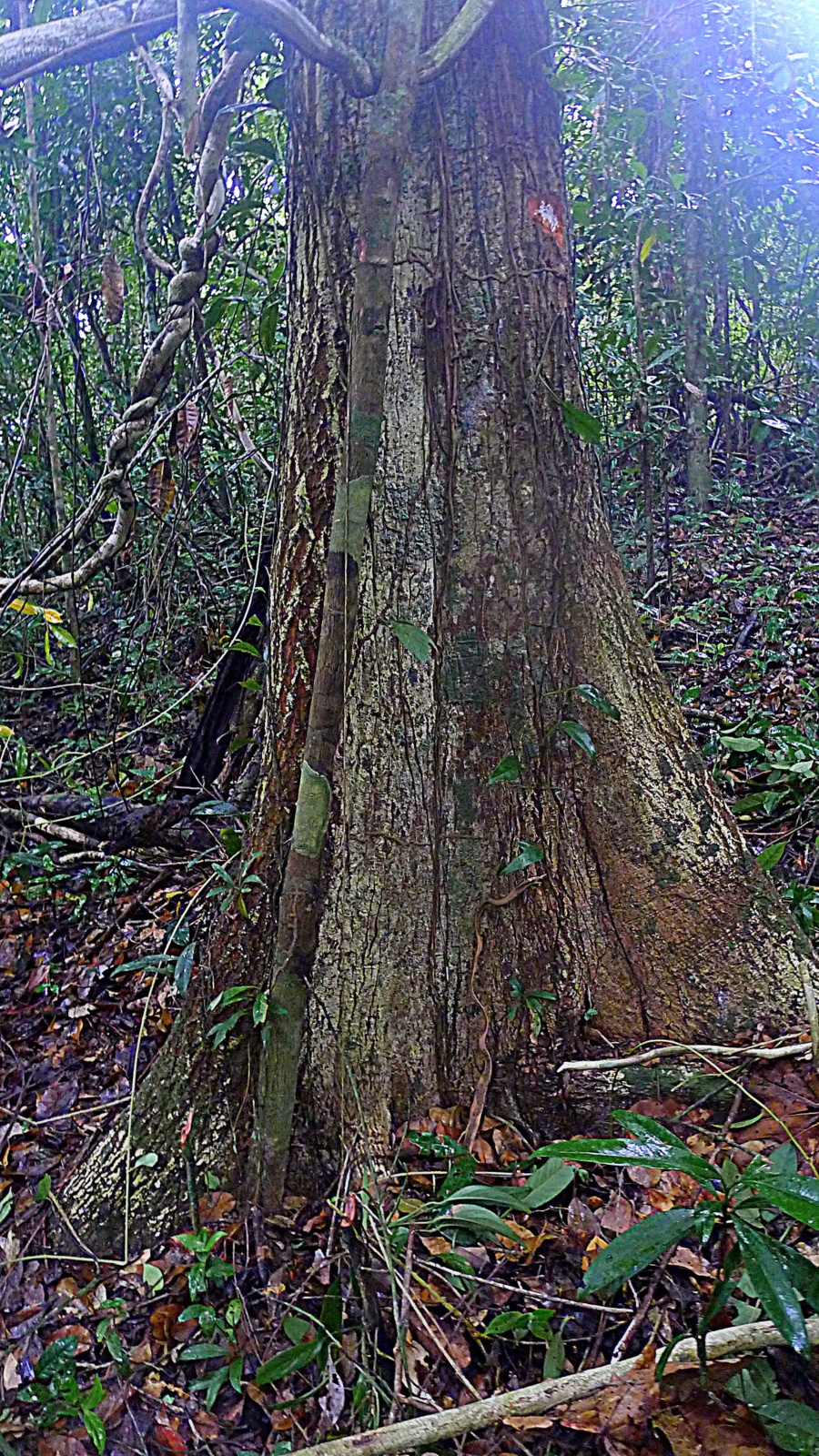

Conservation status
- Conservation Dependent (IUCN 2.3)

Scientific classification
- Kingdom: Plantae
- Clade: Tracheophytes
- Clade: Angiosperms
- Clade: Eudicots
- Clade: Asterids
- Order: Ericales
- Family: Sapotaceae
- Genus: Micropholis
- Species: M. crassipedicellata

Binomial name
- Micropholis crassipedicellata (Mart. & Eichler) Pierre

= Micropholis crassipedicellata =

Species of tree

Micropholis crassipedicellata is a species of tree in the family Sapotaceae. The plant is endemic to the Atlantic Forest ecoregion in southeastern Brazil. It is threatened by habitat loss.
