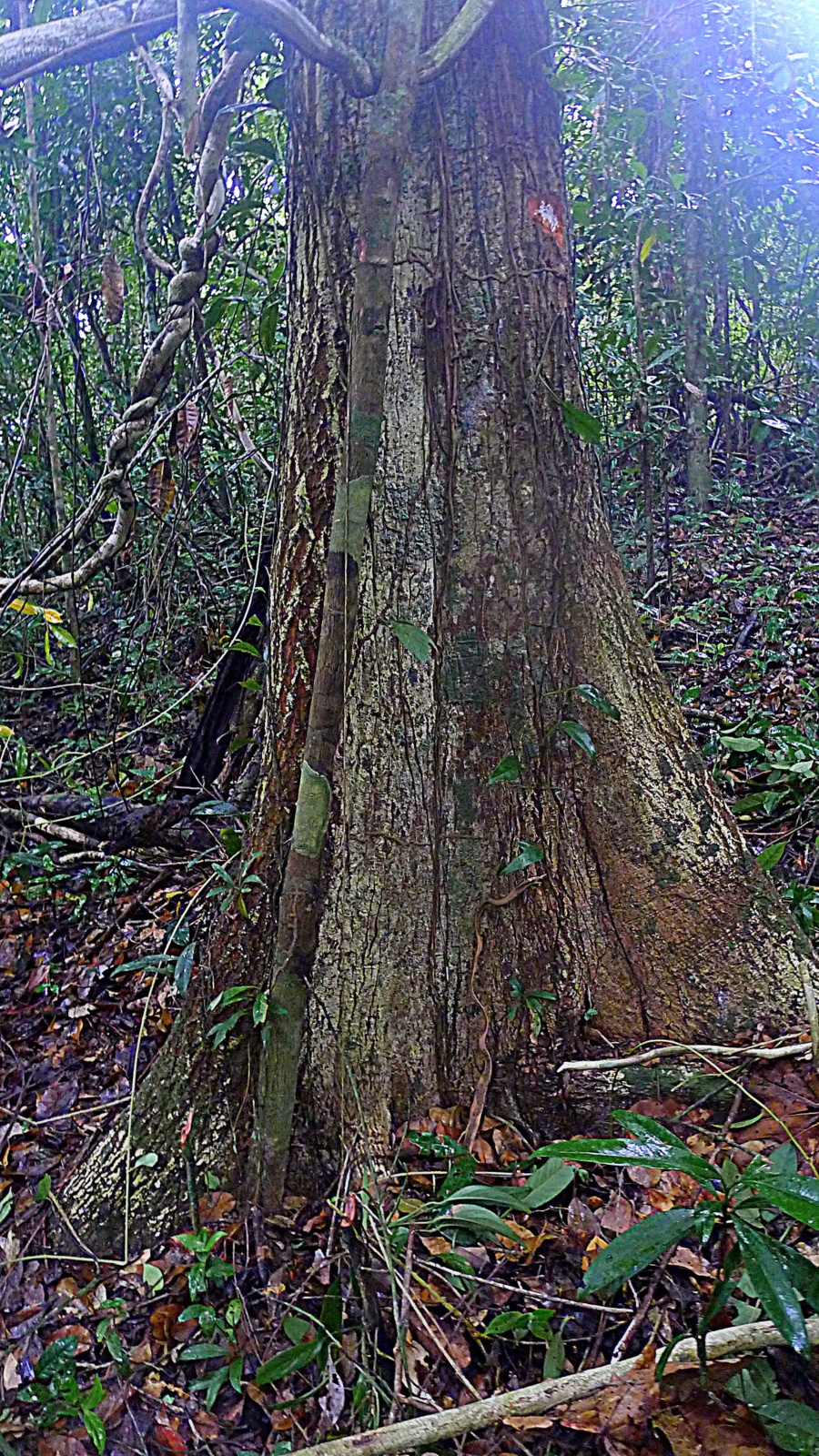
- Micropholis crassipedicellata

Scientific classification
- Kingdom: Plantae
- Clade: Tracheophytes
- Clade: Angiosperms
- Clade: Eudicots
- Clade: Asterids
- Order: Ericales
- Family: Sapotaceae
- Subfamily: Chrysophylloideae
- Genus: Micropholis (Griseb.) Pierre

Synonyms
- Sapota section Micropholis Griseb.; Pouteria section Micropholis (Griseb.) Baehni; Crepinodendron Pierre; Meioluma Baill.; Paramicropholis Aubrév. & Pellegr.; Platyluma Baill.; Sprucella Pierre 1890, illegitimate homonym, not Steph. 1886 (Lepidoziaceae); Stephanoluma Baill.; Syzygiopsis Ducke

= Micropholis =

Genus of flowering plants

Micropholis is genus of trees in the family Sapotaceae, described in 1891.

These trees are native to tropical South America, Mesoamerica, and the West Indies. Most are locally known as "cafetos", literally meaning "coffee plants". But while both Micropholis and the coffeeplant genus Coffea are asterids, the present genus is part of the Ericales – a quite basal asterid lineage – while Coffea belongs to the more advanced Gentianales.

They are valued for their wood, which is used as timber, for construction and as firewood; many species are threatened by overexploitation and habitat destruction. Also, they are often used as part of catuaba, a decoction from various tree's bark claimed to have aphrodisiac and stimulant properties.

Caimitillo verde (M. garciniifolia) is an important food source of the nearly-extinct Puerto Rican amazon bird (Amazona vittata).

== Species ==
41 species are accepted.

1. Micropholis acutangula (Ducke) Eyma – French Guiana, Amapá
2. Micropholis brochidodroma T.D.Penn. – Ecuador, N Peru
3. Micropholis casiquiarensis Aubrév. – Guyana, Venezuela (Amazonas), Brazil (Amazonas)
4. Micropholis caudata T.D.Penn. – Brazil (Amazonas)
5. Micropholis cayennensis T.D.Penn. – French Guiana, Amapá
6. Micropholis compta Pierre – eastern Brazil
7. Micropholis crassipedicellata (Mart. & Eichler) Pierre – eastern and southern Brazil
8. Micropholis crotonoides (Pierre) Pierre – Costa Rica, Panama, St. Lucia, NW South America
9. Micropholis cylindrocarpa (Poepp.) Pierre – Brazil (Amazonas), Peru (Loreto)
10. Micropholis egensis (A.DC.) Pierre – Panama, N South America
11. Micropholis emarginata T.D.Penn. – Bahia
12. Micropholis garciniifolia Pierre – Puerto Rico
13. Micropholis gardneriana (A.DC.) Pierre – Venezuela, Colombia, Brazil
14. Micropholis gnaphaloclados (Mart.) Pierre – Brazil, Bolivia
15. Micropholis grandiflora Aubrév. – Brazil (Amazonas)
16. Micropholis guyanensis (A.DC.) Pierre – Costa Rica, Panama, West Indies, tropSouth America
17. Micropholis humboldtiana (Roem. & Schult.) T.D.Penn. – Venezuela, Brazil
18. Micropholis laevigata (Mart.) Swenson & A.D.Faria – Costa Rica to Peru and northern Brazil
19. Micropholis longipedicellata Aubrév. – French Guiana, Suriname, Guyana, Amapá
20. Micropholis macrophylla (K.Krause) T.D.Penn. – Peru (Loreto)
21. Micropholis madeirensis (Baehni) Aubrév. – Brazil (Amazonas), Peru (Loreto)
22. Micropholis maguirei Aubrév. – Venezuela, Brazil
23. Micropholis maxima (T.D.Penn.) Swenson & A.D.Faria – French Guiana and northern Brazil (Amazonas)
24. Micropholis melinoniana Pierre – S Mexico, Central America, NW South America
25. Micropholis mensalis (Baehni) Aubrév. – French Guiana, Suriname, Guyana, Venezuela, N Brazil
26. Micropholis obscura T.D.Penn. – French Guiana, Suriname, Guyana, Peru, N Brazil
27. Micropholis oppositifolia (Ducke) Swenson – northern Brazil (Pará and Amapá)
28. Micropholis polita (Griseb.) Pierre – Cuba, Haiti
29. Micropholis porphyrocarpa (Baehni) Monach. – French Guiana, Guyana, Peru, N Brazil
30. Micropholis resinifera (Ducke) Eyma – Brazil (Amazonas)
31. Micropholis retusa (Spruce ex Miq.) Eyma – Brazil (Amazonas)
32. Micropholis rugosa (Sw.) Pierre – Jamaica
33. Micropholis sanctae-rosae (Baehni) T.D.Penn. – French Guiana, Ecuador, Peru, N Brazil
34. Micropholis spectabilis (Steyerm.) T.D.Penn. – Bolívar
35. Micropholis splendens Gilly ex Aubrév. – Venezuela, Brazil
36. Micropholis submarginalis Pires & T.D.Penn. – Brazil (Amazonas)
37. Micropholis suborbicularis Aubrév. – Venezuela
38. Micropholis trunciflora Ducke – Peru and northern Brazil
39. Micropholis venamoensis Ducke – Bolívar
40. Micropholis venulosa (Mart. & Eichler) Pierre – Central + South America
41. Micropholis williamii Aubrév. & Pellegr. – Brazil (Amazonas, Pará)
