= Myelobia vinasella =

Scientific classification
- Kingdom: Animalia
- Phylum: Arthropoda
- Clade: Pancrustacea
- Class: Insecta
- Order: Lepidoptera
- Family: Crambidae
- Subfamily: Crambinae
- Tribe: Chiloini
- Genus: Myelobia
- Species: M. vinasella

Binomial name
- Myelobia vinasella (Schaus, 1913)

Synonyms
- Daratoperas vinasella Schaus, 1913

Species of moth

Myelobia vinasella is a moth in the family Crambidae. It is found in Costa Rica.
