= Myelobia spectabilis =

Scientific classification
- Kingdom: Animalia
- Phylum: Arthropoda
- Clade: Pancrustacea
- Class: Insecta
- Order: Lepidoptera
- Family: Crambidae
- Subfamily: Crambinae
- Tribe: Chiloini
- Genus: Myelobia
- Species: M. spectabilis

Binomial name
- Myelobia spectabilis (C. Felder, R. Felder & Rogenhofer, 1875)

Synonyms
- Chilo spectabilis C. Felder, R. Felder & Rogenhofer, 1875

Species of moth

Myelobia spectabilis is a moth in the family Crambidae. It is found in Colombia.
