= Howard E. Bigelow =

American mycologist (1923–1987)

Howard Elson Bigelow
- Born: June 28, 1923
- Died: November 21, 1987 (aged 64); Greenfield, Massachusetts
- Citizenship: United States
- Education: University of Michigan, Ann Arbor
- Known for: Agaric mycota of the New England area
- Scientific career
- Fields: Mycology
- Workplaces: Department of Botany, University of Massachusetts Amherst, University of Montreal
- Doctoral advisor: Alexander H. Smith
- Author abbrev. (botany): H.E. Bigelow

Howard Elson Bigelow (June 28, 1923 – November 21, 1987) was an American mycologist, born in 1923 in Greenfield, Massachusetts, and died in 1987. He studied at Oberlin College from 1941 to 1943. He left college to fight in the American army. He returned to Oberlin after the war and obtained his Bachelor of Arts in 1949 and his Master of Arts in 1951. He studied botany at the University of Michigan under the guidance of Alexander Hanchett Smith (1904–1986) and received his doctorate in 1956. He was wed to mycologist Margaret Elizabeth Barr-Bigelow in 1956. Bigelow and his wife worked for University of Massachusetts from 1957 to his death. He is the author of works on the fungi of the genus Clitocybe and the family Tricholomataceae.

== Selected publications ==
- Bigelow, HE. 1960, publ. 1962. Unusual fruiting of Cordyceps militaris. Mycologia 52 (6): 958.
- ___________; Barr, ME. 1962. Contribution to the fungus flora of north-eastern North America. Rhodora 64 (758): 126–137, illus.
- ___________; Barr, ME. 1963. Contribution to the fungus flora of north-eastern North America. III. Rhodora 65 (764): 289–309, 4 pls, 10 figs.
- ___________; Smith, AH. 1963. Clitocybe species from the Western United States. Mycologia 54 (5): 498–515, 4 pls.
- ___________. 1965. The genus Clitocybe in North America: section Clitocybe. Lloydia 28 (2): 139–180.
- ___________. 1985. North American species of Clitocybe. Part II. Beihefte zur Nova Hedwigia 81: 281–471, 49 planchas.
- ___________; HD Thiers, edit. 1975. Studies on Higher Fungi, a Collection of Papers Dedicated to Dr. Alexander H. Smith on the Occasion of His Seventieth Birthday. 78 planchas (2 coloreadas) & 12 figuras en texto. 8vo, pp. vi+372. ISBN 3-7682-5451-8
- ___________. 1979. Mushroom pocket field guide. 117 pp. ilustraciones. 1ª impr. 1974. ISBN 0-02-062200-7
- ___________. 1982. North American Species of Clitocybe. Ed. Lubrecht & Cramer Ltd, Port Jervis. ISBN 3-7682-5472-0

== See also ==
- List of mycologists
