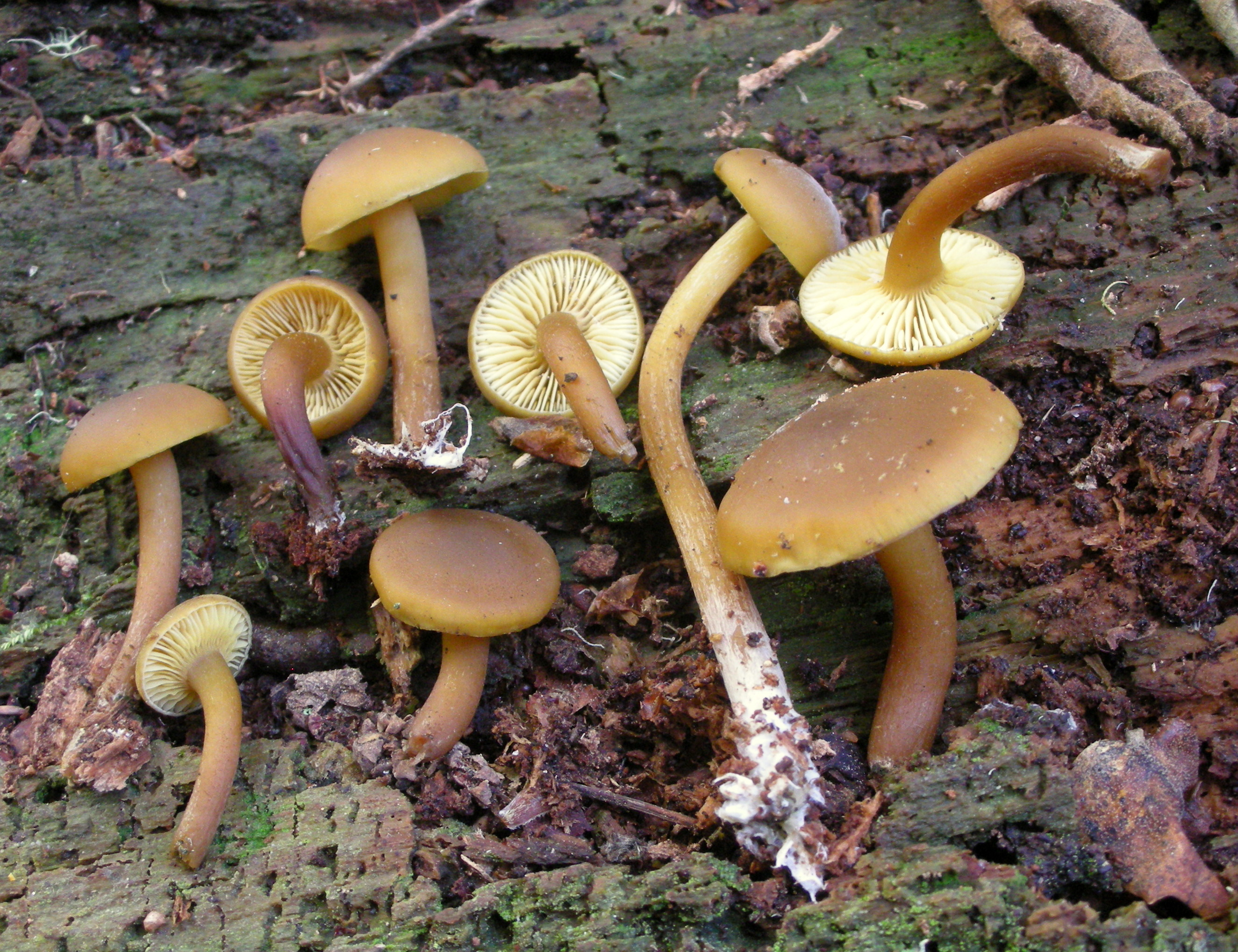
- Callistosporium luteo-olivaceum, Canada

Scientific classification
- Kingdom: Fungi
- Division: Basidiomycota
- Class: Agaricomycetes
- Order: Agaricales
- Family: Callistosporiaceae; Vizzini, Consiglio, M. Marchetti & P. Alvarado (2020)

Type genus
- Callistosporium Singer (1944)

Genera
- Anupama; Callistosporium; Guyanagarika; Macrocybe; Pseudolaccaria; Xerophorus

= Callistosporiaceae =

Family of fungi

The Callistosporiaceae are a family of fungi in the order Agaricales. The family contains six genera. All species form agaricoid basidiocarps (gilled mushrooms). The family is based on recent DNA research.
