= Tamarind (disambiguation) =

Tamarind (Tamarindus indica) is a species of tree and the fruit from that tree.

Tamarind may also refer to:

- Diploglottis australis, or native tamarind, a rainforest tree of Eastern Australia
- Garcinia gummi-gutta, or Malabar tamarind, native to Indonesia
- Garcinia atroviridis, a rainforest tree native to Peninsular Malaysia
- Dialium cochinchinense, or velvet tamarind, native to southeast Asia
- Dialium guineense, or velvet tamarind, native to Africa
- Dialium indum, or tamarind-plum, native to south and southeast Asia
- Tamarind Institute, a lithography workshop
- Tamarind (restaurant), in London

== See also ==
- Tamarindo (disambiguation), the Spanish name for tamarind
