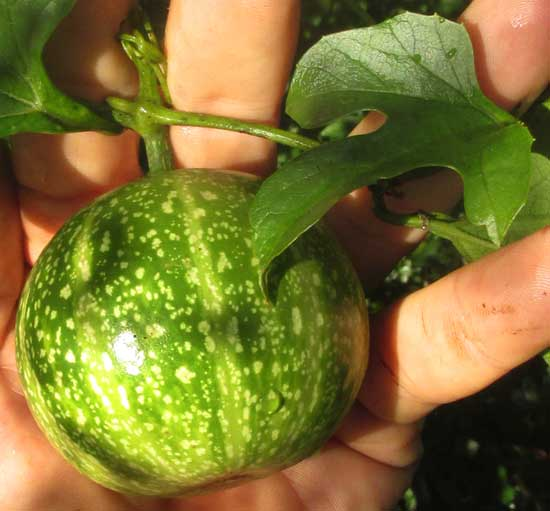
- Cionosicys excisus immature fruit and 3-lobed leaf

Scientific classification
- Kingdom: Plantae
- Clade: Embryophytes
- Clade: Tracheophytes
- Clade: Angiosperms
- Clade: Eudicots
- Clade: Rosids
- Order: Cucurbitales
- Family: Cucurbitaceae
- Genus: Cionosicys
- Species: C. excisus

Binomial name
- Cionosicys excisus (Griseb.) C.Jeffrey

Synonyms
- Arkezostis excisa (Griseb.) Kuntze; Cayaponia excisa (Griseb.) Cogn.; Sicana excisa Griseb.; Arkezostis alata (Cogn.) Kuntze; Cayaponia alata Cogn.

= Cionosicys excisus =

Species of plant

Cionosicys excisus is a species of herbaceous plant native to Mesoamerica. It belongs to the family Cucurbitaceae.

== Description ==
Here are distinctive field marks of Cionosicys excisus:

- It is a perennial climber with hairless or nearly hairless stems reaching several meters (yards) long. Its tendrils may fork or not.
- On petioles up to about 4 cm (1 1/2 in) long, large, mostly hairless leaves may be deeply 3-7 lobed or unlobed; lobes are a little narrowed at their bases. Blades are up to about 12 cm (4 1/2 in) long and wide, with a somewhat leathery texture, and their undersides are sparsely to fairly hairy and densely dotted. Blade margins may bear very small teeth well distant from one another.

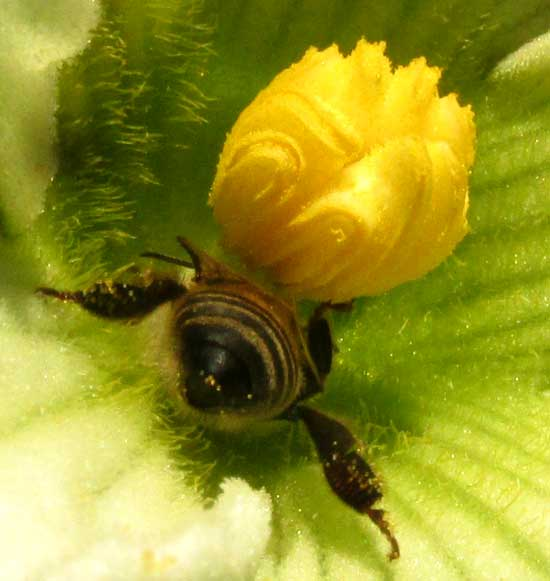
3 fused anthers each with 3 folded thecae, plus a bee

- Male and female flowers arise singly or sometimes a few in a group, where leaves attach to the stems. Male flower corollas are up to 2 cm (3/4 in) wide, while those of female flowers are considerably smaller. Male flowers have 3 stamens whose separate, short filaments each are topped with a large anther whose sides fuse with the sides of neighboring anthers. An unusual feature is that each of the 3 anthers, instead of the usual 2, has 3 compartments, or "thecae," which split open to release pollen. These thecae fold back on themselves, producing the effect seen in the accompanying image. On female flowers the green ovary develops below the greenish-white corolla, and within the corolla the stigmas are strongly warty.
- Spherical fruits up to 5.5 cm (2 1/8 in) in diameter, with many seeds, have a leathery outer skin. Technically the fruits are "pepos," which are modified berries. The skin becomes orangish while the interior is white, the seeds up to 1 cm (3/8 in) long. Apparently birds may peck holes in fruits to get at the food inside, as appears to have happened with the fruit picture in the gallery.

== Distribution ==
In southern Mexico, C. excisus occurs in the Yucatan Peninsula as well as Morelos, Tabasco and Chiapas. In the Caribbean, it is found in Cuba the Cayman Islands. In Central America, its range extends into Belize, Guatemala and Honduras.

== Habitat ==
In Mexico's Yucatan Peninsula, C. excisus occurs in secondary vegetation, including roadsides and cultivated fields. Also in the Yucatan Peninsula it is found in forests of Ramón and Guapaque.

== Taxonomy ==
In 1866, when August Grisebach formally described Cionosicys excisus under the basionym of Sicana excisa, he noted that his type specimen had been collected by Charles Wright, his collection #2593, at La Grifa in western Cuba. Probably this was the La Grifa on highway 22 at the southwestern-most tip of Cuba.

=== Etymology ===
The genus name Cionosicys comes from the Greek kion, meaning "column, pilar", and sikyos, meaning "little squash or gourd living wild."

The species name excisus is the Latin word excisus, meaning "cut out or removed," possibly referring to the deeply lobed leaves.

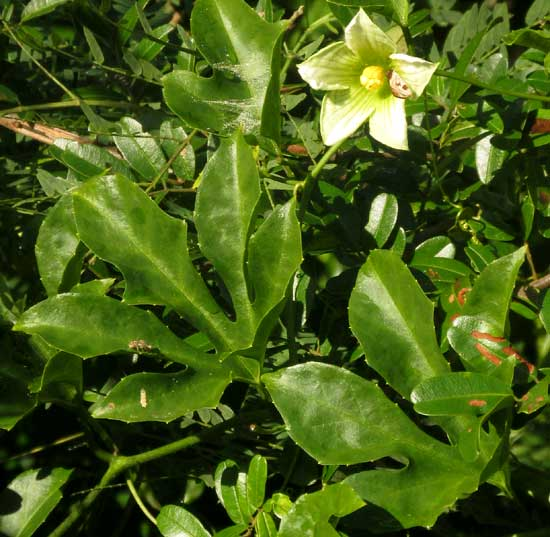
Male flower and 5-lobed leaves

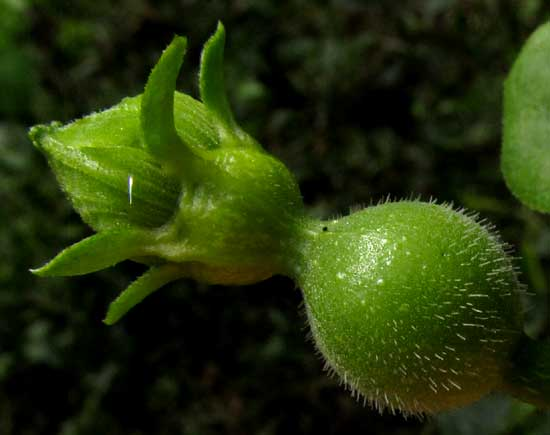
Immature female flower with hairy ovary

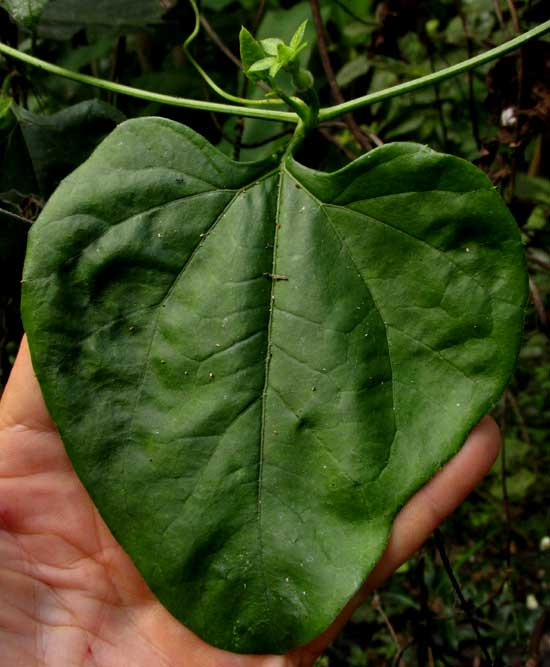
Immature female flower with unlobed leaf

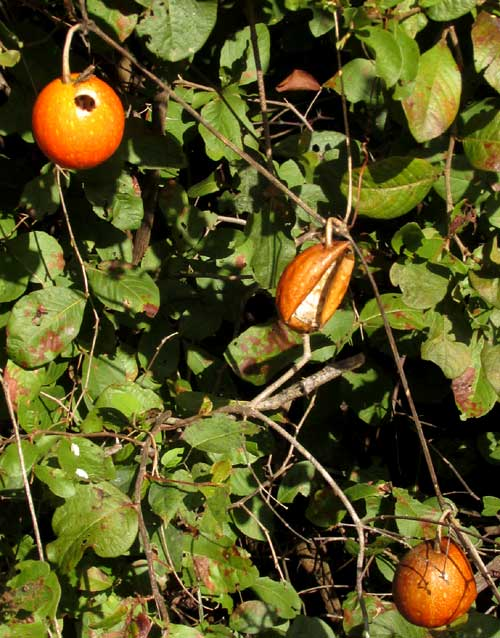
Mature fruits
