= Heteroglenea fissilis =

Scientific classification
- Kingdom: Animalia
- Phylum: Arthropoda
- Class: Insecta
- Order: Coleoptera
- Suborder: Polyphaga
- Infraorder: Cucujiformia
- Family: Cerambycidae
- Genus: Heteroglenea
- Species: H. fissilis

Binomial name
- Heteroglenea fissilis (Breuning, 1953)

Synonyms
- Glenea fissilis Breuning, 1953

Species of beetle

Heteroglenea fissilis is a species of beetle in the family Cerambycidae. It was described by Stephan von Breuning in 1953. It is known from Myanmar, India, Bangladesh, Laos, China, and Thailand. It feeds on Dialium cochinchinense.
