= Aju Mbaise =

Nigerian traditional herbal mixture

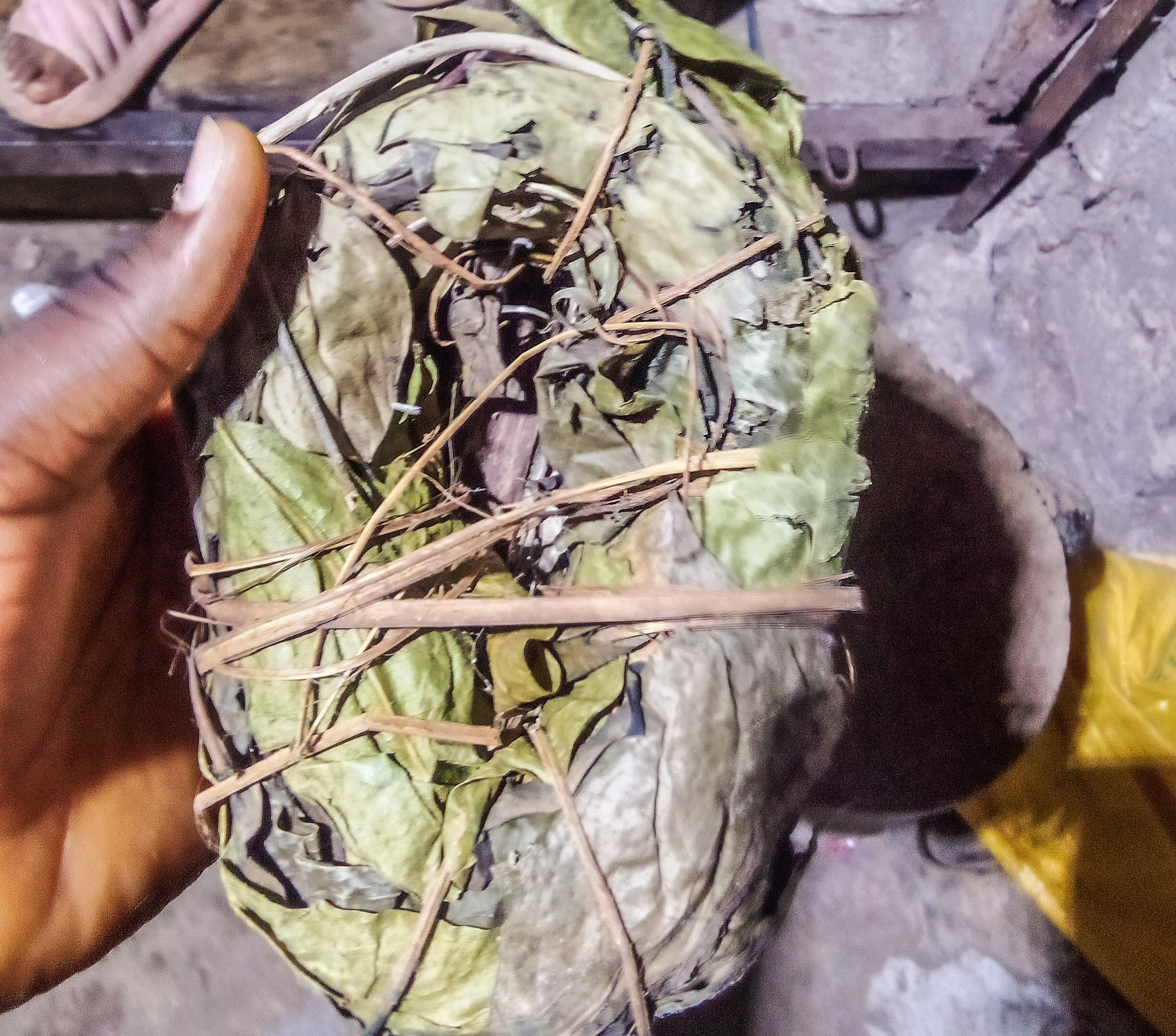

Aju Mbaise (also spelled Ajụ Mbaise) is a traditional polyherbal mixture originating from the Mbaise area of Imo State, Nigeria. It consists of a combination of medicinal plant parts (such as leaves, roots, stems and barks) bound together and boiled to prepare a decoction traditionally consumed for nutritional support and purported health benefits. The preparation is widely used in parts of southeastern and southern Nigeria for postpartum care, weight management and general well-being.

== Botanical composition and nutritional properties ==
A 2020 study conducted at the University of Port Harcourt identified multiple plant species used in the Aju Mbaise cocktail, including Cnestis ferruginea, Xylopia aethiopica, Uvaria chamae, Palisota hirsuta, Scleria species, Napoleona imperialis, Dialium guineense, Combretum racemosum and Heterotis rotundifolia. The proximate analysis of the mixture revealed significant carbohydrate, protein, and mineral content, along with vitamins A, B, C, D and K. The authors concluded that the herbal cocktail exhibits high nutritional value relevant to traditional use.

== Phytochemical and pharmacological research ==
Phytochemical screening of Aju Mbaise extracts has been reported to show the presence of alkaloids, flavonoids, tannins, cardiac glycosides and coumarins in both aqueous and ethanol preparations. A study published in the Tropical Journal of Natural Product Research evaluated aqueous and ethanol extracts of the decoction and demonstrated antibacterial activity against several bacterial species, as well as effects on body weight and liver toxicity in rodent models.

Further research has examined the effects of Aju Mbaise extracts on body weight, oxidative stress markers and organ histology in animal studies, indicating potential impacts on lipid profiles and oxidative stress, although these findings are experimental and not clinical.

== Traditional uses ==
Among local communities in southeastern and southern Nigeria, Aju Mbaise is traditionally consumed to aid postpartum recovery, assist with weight reduction and support general well-being. Traditional medicinal use of polyherbal mixtures like Aju Mbaise reflects a cultural practice integrated into maternal care and ethnomedicine in the Igbo region. Many practitioners also attribute additional benefits to the preparation, though these uses remain primarily within traditional knowledge systems rather than established clinical evidence.

== See also ==
- Ethnobotany
- Mbaise
- Nigerian traditional medicine
- Traditional medicine
