= Heterotis =

Heterotis is the scientific name of two genera of organisms and may refer to:

- Heterotis (fish), a genus of fishes in the family Osteoglossidae
- Heterotis (plant), a genus of plants in the family Melastomataceae
