= Dialium orientale =

Conservation status
- Vulnerable (IUCN 3.1)

Scientific classification
- Kingdom: Plantae
- Clade: Tracheophytes
- Clade: Angiosperms
- Clade: Eudicots
- Clade: Rosids
- Order: Fabales
- Family: Fabaceae
- Genus: Dialium
- Species: D. orientale

Binomial name
- Dialium orientale Baker.f.

Species of legume

Dialium orientale is a species of plant in the family Fabaceae.It is found in Kenya, Somalia, and Tanzania. The fruit of this tree is a popular snack in Kenya and known as pepeta. It is threatened by habitat loss.
