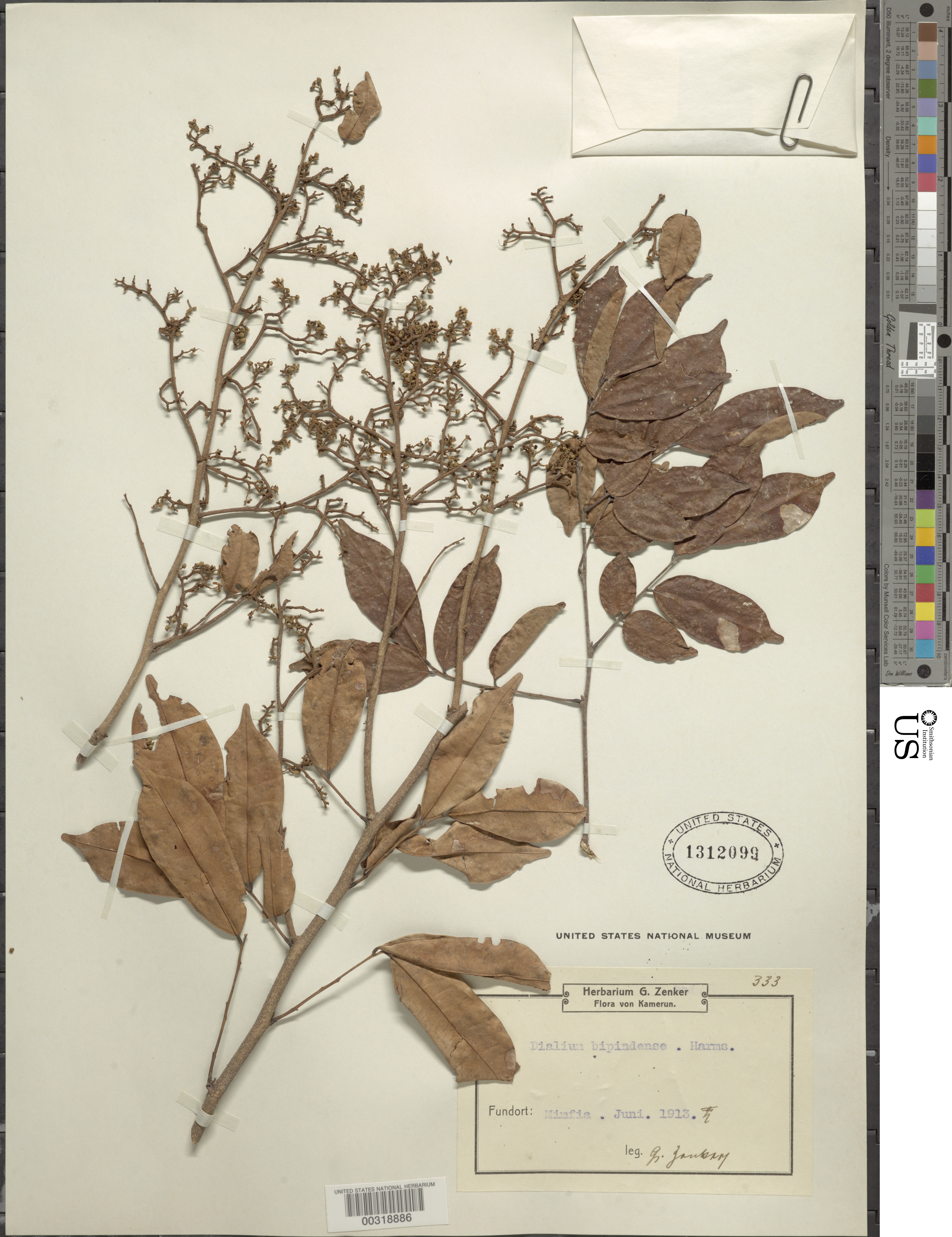
- Dialium bipindense

Conservation status
- Least Concern (IUCN 3.1)

Scientific classification
- Kingdom: Plantae
- Clade: Tracheophytes
- Clade: Angiosperms
- Clade: Eudicots
- Clade: Rosids
- Order: Fabales
- Family: Fabaceae
- Genus: Dialium
- Species: D. bipindense

Binomial name
- Dialium bipindense Harms

= Dialium bipindense =

Species of legume

Dialium bipindense is a species of flowering plant in the family Fabaceae. It is native to Cameroon and Gabon. It is threatened by habitat loss.
