= Heteroglenea glechoma =

Scientific classification
- Kingdom: Animalia
- Phylum: Arthropoda
- Clade: Pancrustacea
- Class: Insecta
- Order: Coleoptera
- Suborder: Polyphaga
- Infraorder: Cucujiformia
- Family: Cerambycidae
- Genus: Heteroglenea
- Species: H. glechoma

Binomial name
- Heteroglenea glechoma (Pascoe, 1867)

Synonyms
- Glenea versuta (Newman) Chou, 2004; Glenea fuscovirgata Fairmaire, 1883; Glenea glechoma Pascoe, 1867; Sphenura glechoma (Pascoe, 1867); Glenea hamabovola Hayashi, 1975; Glenea palawana Breuning, 1956; Glenea guadalcanalana Breuning, 1958

Species of beetle

Heteroglenea glechoma is a species of beetle in the family Cerambycidae. It was described by Francis Polkinghorne Pascoe in 1867, originally under the genus Glenea. It is known from Papua New Guinea, Japan, the Solomon Islands, Moluccas, the Philippines, Java, Taiwan, and Sumatra.
