= Heteroglenea momeitensis =

Scientific classification
- Kingdom: Animalia
- Phylum: Arthropoda
- Class: Insecta
- Order: Coleoptera
- Suborder: Polyphaga
- Infraorder: Cucujiformia
- Family: Cerambycidae
- Genus: Heteroglenea
- Species: H. momeitensis

Binomial name
- Heteroglenea momeitensis (Breuning, 1956)

Synonyms
- Glenea momeitensis Breuning, 1956

Species of beetle

Heteroglenea momeitensis is a species of beetle in the family Cerambycidae. It was described by Stephan von Breuning in 1956. It is known from Myanmar.
