= Tamarindo =

Tamarindo may refer to:

- Tamarindo, Costa Rica, a district in Costa Rica
- El Tamarindo, a beach area in Puerto Sandino, Nicaragua
- Tamarindo (drink), a sweet drink also known as agua de tamarindo
- Tamarindo Wildlife Refuge, now part of Las Baulas Marine National Park
- El Tamarindo, a settlement in Nayarit, Mexico

== See also ==
- Tamarind (disambiguation), other tropical trees
- Tamarin, a kind of monkey
