= Dialium excelsum =

Conservation status
- Least Concern (IUCN 3.1)

Scientific classification
- Kingdom: Plantae
- Clade: Tracheophytes
- Clade: Angiosperms
- Clade: Eudicots
- Clade: Rosids
- Order: Fabales
- Family: Fabaceae
- Genus: Dialium
- Species: D. excelsum

Binomial name
- Dialium excelsum Louis ex Steyaert

Species of legume

Dialium excelsum is a species of flowering plant in the family Fabaceae. It is a tree native to central Africa, ranging from Cameroon through Republic of the Congo and Democratic Republic of the Congo to South Sudan and western Uganda. It grows in terre firme tropical lowland rainforest, including the Ituri Forest in the eastern DRC, from 450 to 1,050 metres elevation. It is threatened by mining and forest clearing.
