= Heteroglenea nigromaculata =

Scientific classification
- Domain: Eukaryota
- Kingdom: Animalia
- Phylum: Arthropoda
- Class: Insecta
- Order: Coleoptera
- Suborder: Polyphaga
- Infraorder: Cucujiformia
- Family: Cerambycidae
- Genus: Heteroglenea
- Species: H. nigromaculata

Binomial name
- Heteroglenea nigromaculata (Thomson, 1865)

Synonyms
- Daphisia hamifera Heller, 1926; Glenea nigromaculata Thomson, 1865; Sphenura nigromaculata (Thomson) Gemminger & Harold, 1873; Glenea amelia Gahan, 1889

Species of beetle

Heteroglenea nigromaculata is a species of beetle in the family Cerambycidae. It was described by James Thomson in 1865. It is known from Laos, China, Thailand, Myanmar, Cambodia, Vietnam, Philippines and India . It feeds on Streblus asper.
