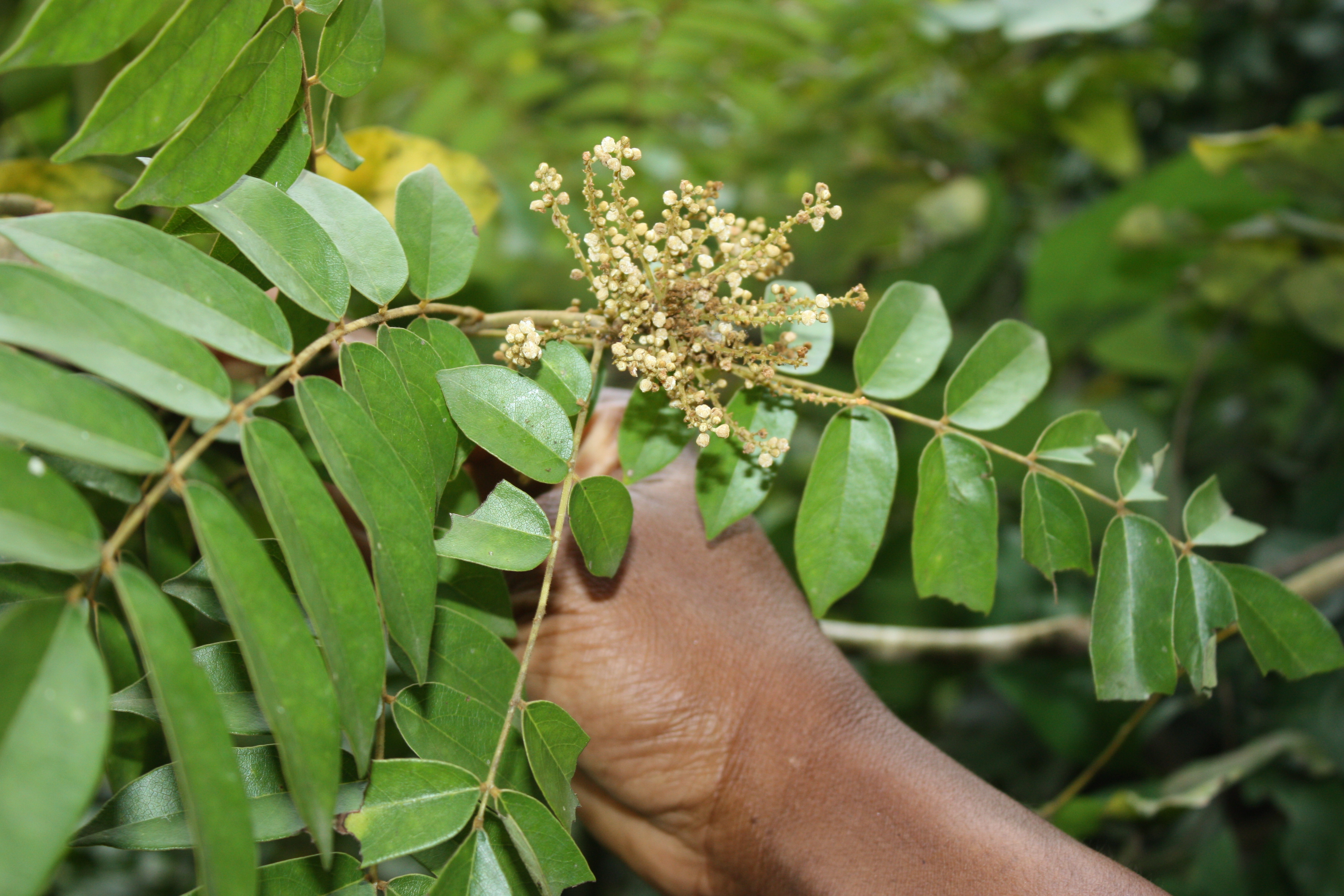

Scientific classification
- Kingdom: Plantae
- Clade: Tracheophytes
- Clade: Angiosperms
- Clade: Eudicots
- Clade: Rosids
- Order: Oxalidales
- Family: Connaraceae
- Genus: Cnestis
- Species: C. ferruginea

Binomial name
- Cnestis ferruginea Vahl ex DC.

= Cnestis ferruginea =

Species of flowering plant

The shrub Cnestis ferruginea is native to Africa. It is best known for its uses in herbal medicine.

== Medicinal uses ==
The tart, astringent fruit is chewed for oral hygiene. Extracts from the fruit have been found to have antimicrobial effects, especially against gram-positive bacteria.It is used in the Nigerian polyherbal mixture Aju Mbaise along with other plant species.
