= Dialium holtzii =

Conservation status
- Least Concern (IUCN 3.1)

Scientific classification
- Kingdom: Plantae
- Clade: Tracheophytes
- Clade: Angiosperms
- Clade: Eudicots
- Clade: Rosids
- Order: Fabales
- Family: Fabaceae
- Genus: Dialium
- Species: D. holtzii

Binomial name
- Dialium holtzii Harms

Species of legume

Dialium holtzii is a species of plant in the family Fabaceae. It is found in Kenya, Mozambique, and Tanzania.
