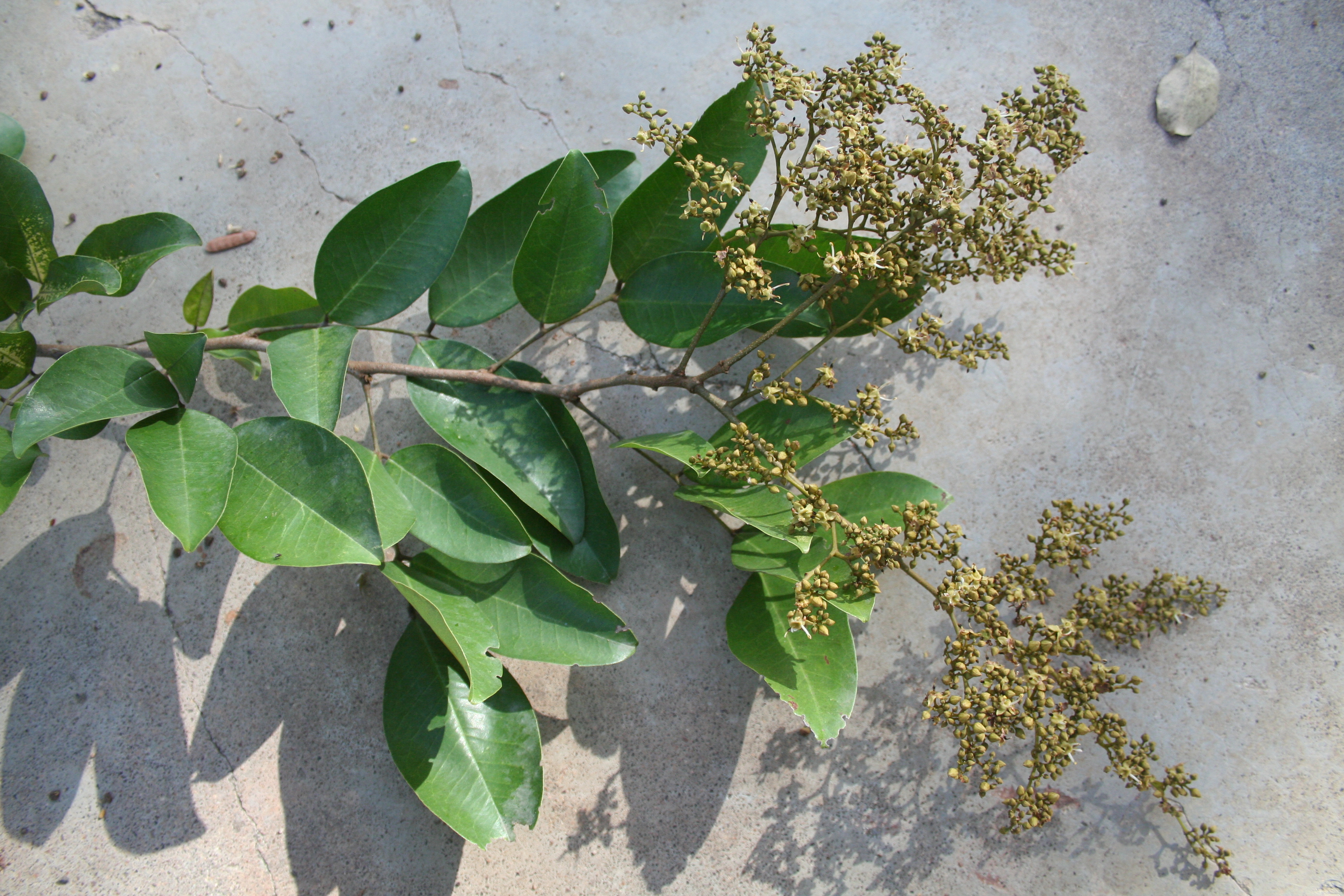
- Dialium guineense

Scientific classification
- Kingdom: Plantae
- Clade: Tracheophytes
- Clade: Angiosperms
- Clade: Eudicots
- Clade: Rosids
- Order: Fabales
- Family: Fabaceae
- Subfamily: Dialioideae
- Genus: Dialium; L.

Synonyms
- Andradia Sim (1909); Arouna Aubl. (1775); Cleyria Neck. (1790), opus utique oppr.; Codarium Sol. ex Vahl (1804); Correa M.E.Becerra (1936), no Latin descr.; Dansera Steenis (1948); Rhynchocarpa Backer ex K. Heyne (1927), nom. illeg.; Sciaplea Rauschert (1982); Sennia Chiov. (1932), non Pascher (1912).

= Dialium =

Genus of legumes

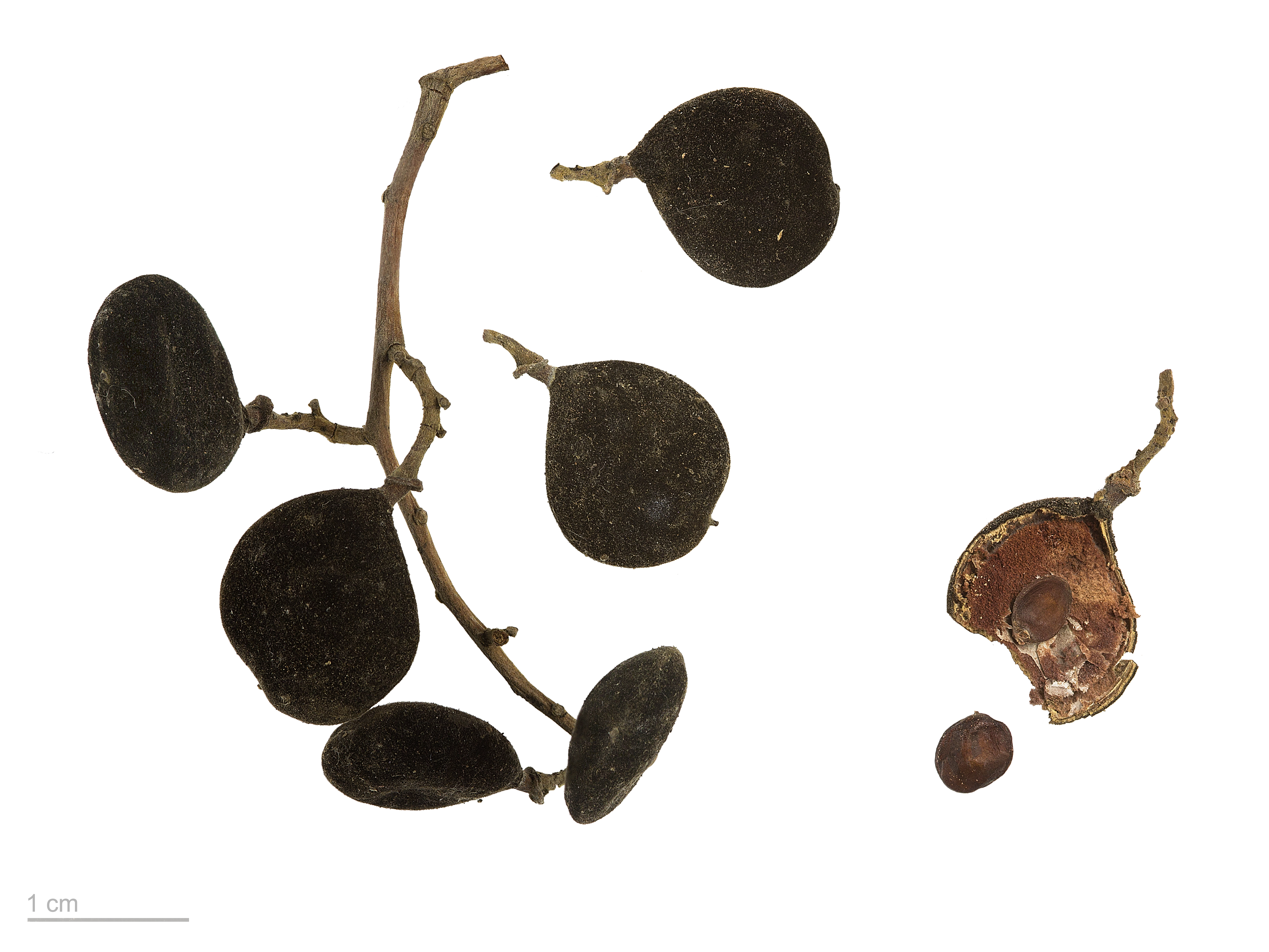
Dialium sp. - MHNT

Dialium is a genus of flowering plants in the family Fabaceae, subfamily Dialioideae. Velvet tamarind is a common name for several species. The genus includes 37 species which range from the tropical Americas to sub-Saharan Africa, Madagascar, India, Indochina, and western Malesia.

== Species ==
As of August 2023, Plants of the World Online accepted the following species:

- Dialium angolense Welw. ex Oliv.
- Dialium bipindense Harms
- Dialium cochinchinense Pierre
- Dialium congestum M.J.Falcão & Mansano
- Dialium dinklagei Harms
- Dialium englerianum Henriq.
- Dialium excelsum Louis ex Steyaert
- Dialium graciliflorum Harms
- Dialium guianense (Aubl.) Sandwith
- Dialium guineense Willd.
- Dialium heterophyllum M.J.Falcão & Mansano
- Dialium hexaestaminatum M.J.Falcão & Mansano
- Dialium hexasepalum Harms
- Dialium holtzii Harms
- Dialium hydnocarpoides de Wit
- Dialium indum L. - type species
- Dialium kasaiense Louis ex Steyaert
- Dialium kunstleri Prain
- Dialium latifolium Harms
- Dialium lopense Breteler
- Dialium madagascariense Baill. ex Drake
- Dialium occidentale (Capuron) Du Puy & R.Rabev.
- Dialium orientale Baker f.
- Dialium ovoideum Thwaites
- Dialium pachyphyllum Harms
- Dialium pentandrum Louis ex Steyaert
- Dialium platysepalum Baker
- Dialium pobeguinii Pellegr.
- Dialium poggei Harms
- Dialium polyanthum Harms (synonym Dialium corbisieri Staner)
- Dialium reygaertii De Wild.
- Dialium rondoniense M.J.Falcão & Mansano
- Dialium schlechteri Harms
- Dialium tessmannii Harms
- Dialium travancoricum Bourd.
- Dialium unifoliolatum Capuron
- Dialium zenkeri Harms
