= Heteroglenea mediodiscoprolongata =

Scientific classification
- Kingdom: Animalia
- Phylum: Arthropoda
- Class: Insecta
- Order: Coleoptera
- Suborder: Polyphaga
- Infraorder: Cucujiformia
- Family: Cerambycidae
- Genus: Heteroglenea
- Species: H. mediodiscoprolongata

Binomial name
- Heteroglenea mediodiscoprolongata (Breuning, 1964)

Synonyms
- Glenea mimoluctuosa Breuning, 1968; Glenea momeitensis mediodiscoprolongata Breuning, 1964

Species of beetle

Heteroglenea mediodiscoprolongata is a species of beetle in the family Cerambycidae. It was described by Stephan von Breuning in 1964, originally under the genus Glenea. It is known from Laos, China, and Thailand.
