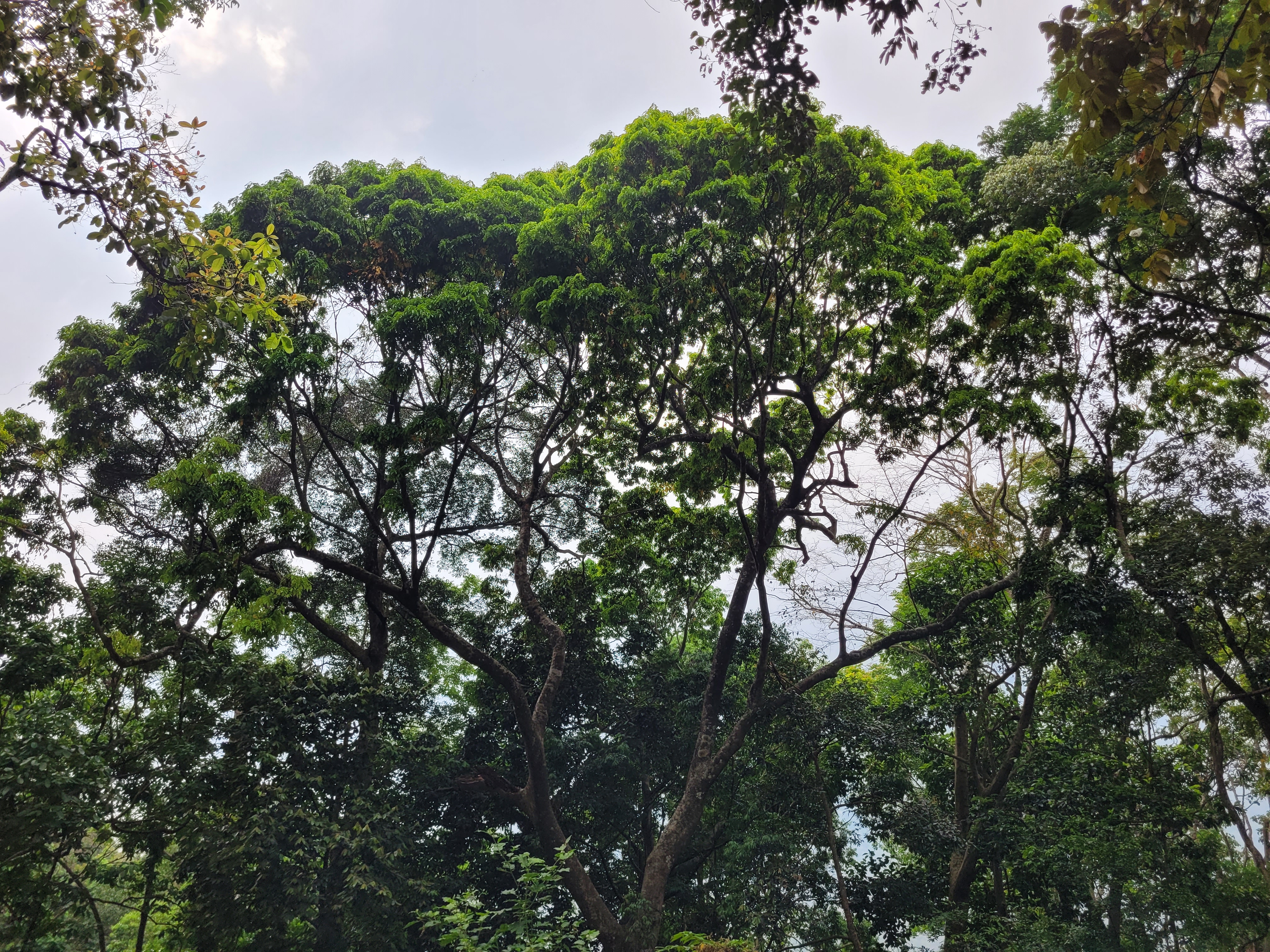

Conservation status
- Critically Endangered (IUCN 3.1)

Scientific classification
- Kingdom: Plantae
- Clade: Embryophytes
- Clade: Tracheophytes
- Clade: Spermatophytes
- Clade: Angiosperms
- Clade: Eudicots
- Clade: Rosids
- Order: Fabales
- Family: Fabaceae
- Genus: Dialium
- Species: D. travancoricum

Binomial name
- Dialium travancoricum Bourd.

= Dialium travancoricum =

Species of legume

Dialium travancoricum is a critically endangered species of plant in the family Fabaceae. It is found only in the Western Ghats of Kerala in southwestern India, specifically around the Travancore range near Ponmudi and Ariankavu. It is threatened by habitat loss.

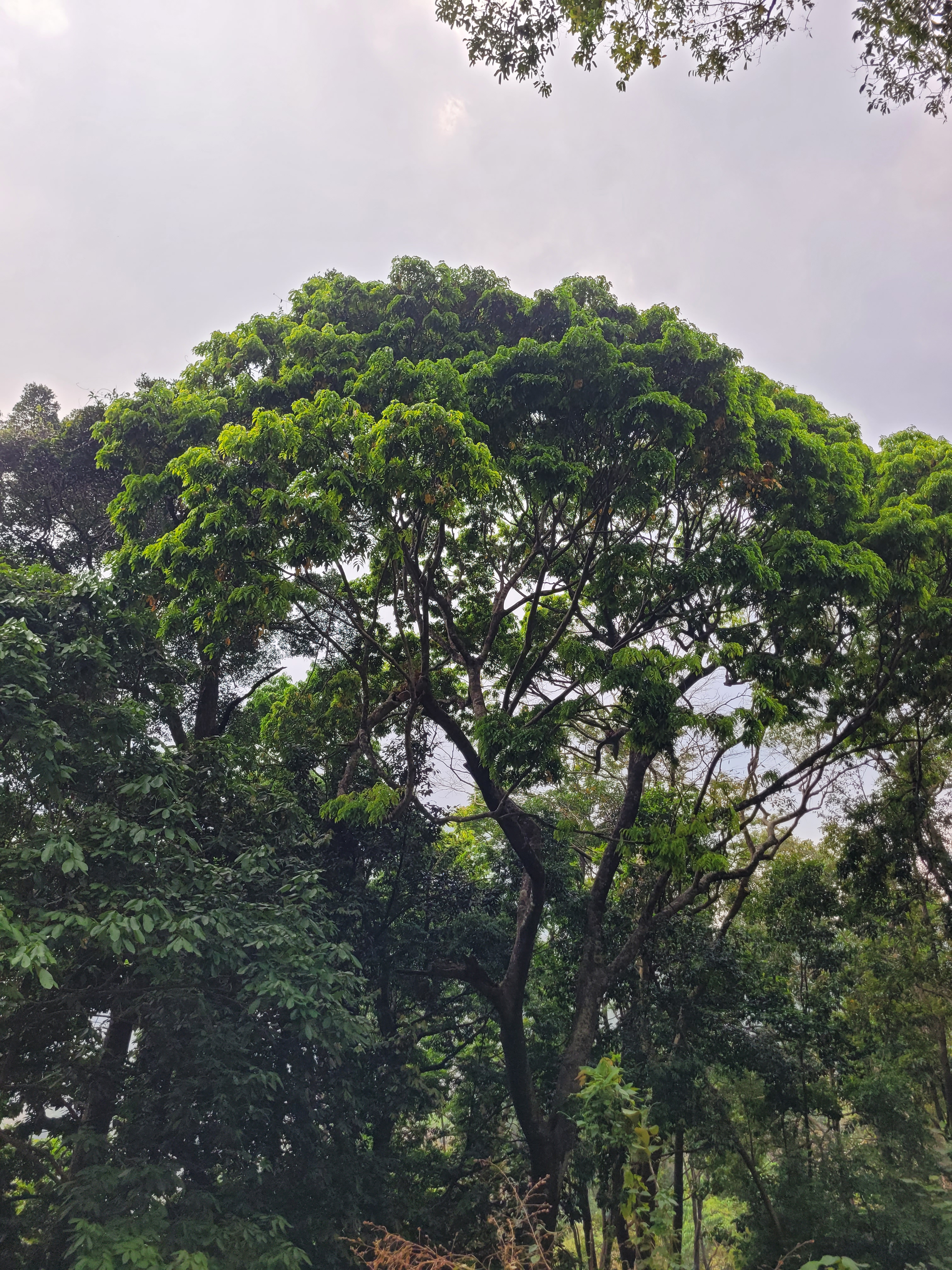
Habit

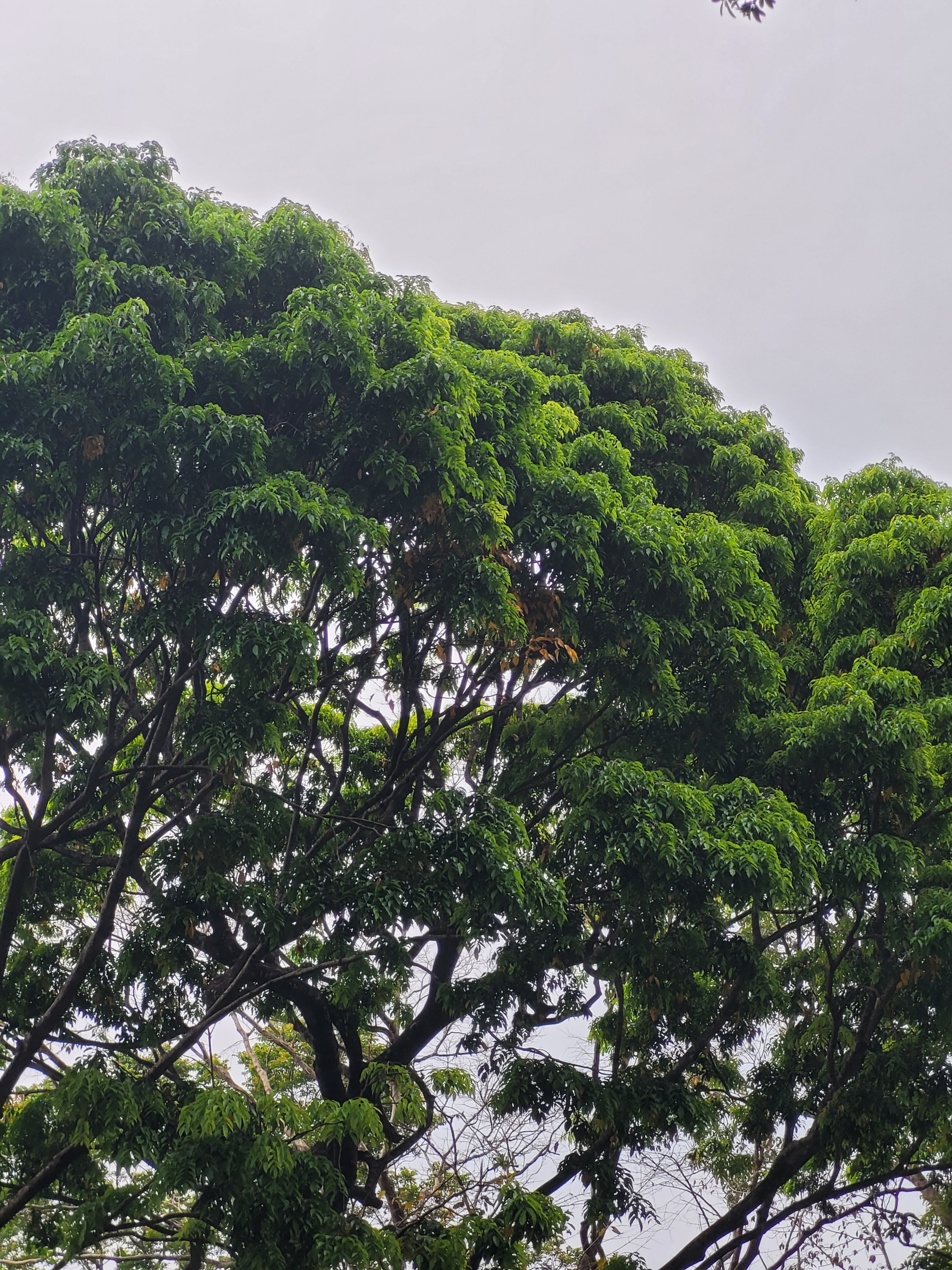
Branches

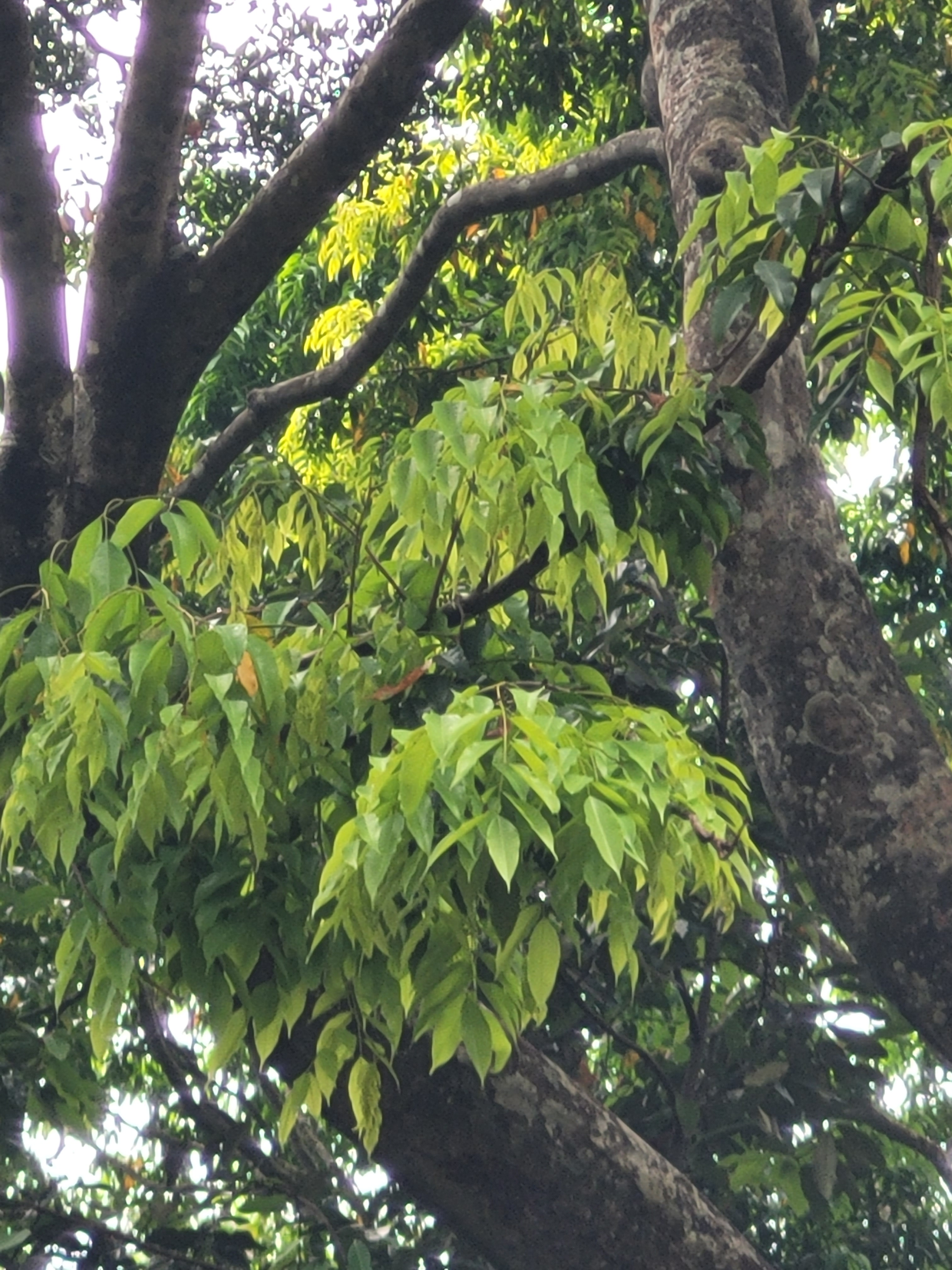
Leaves
