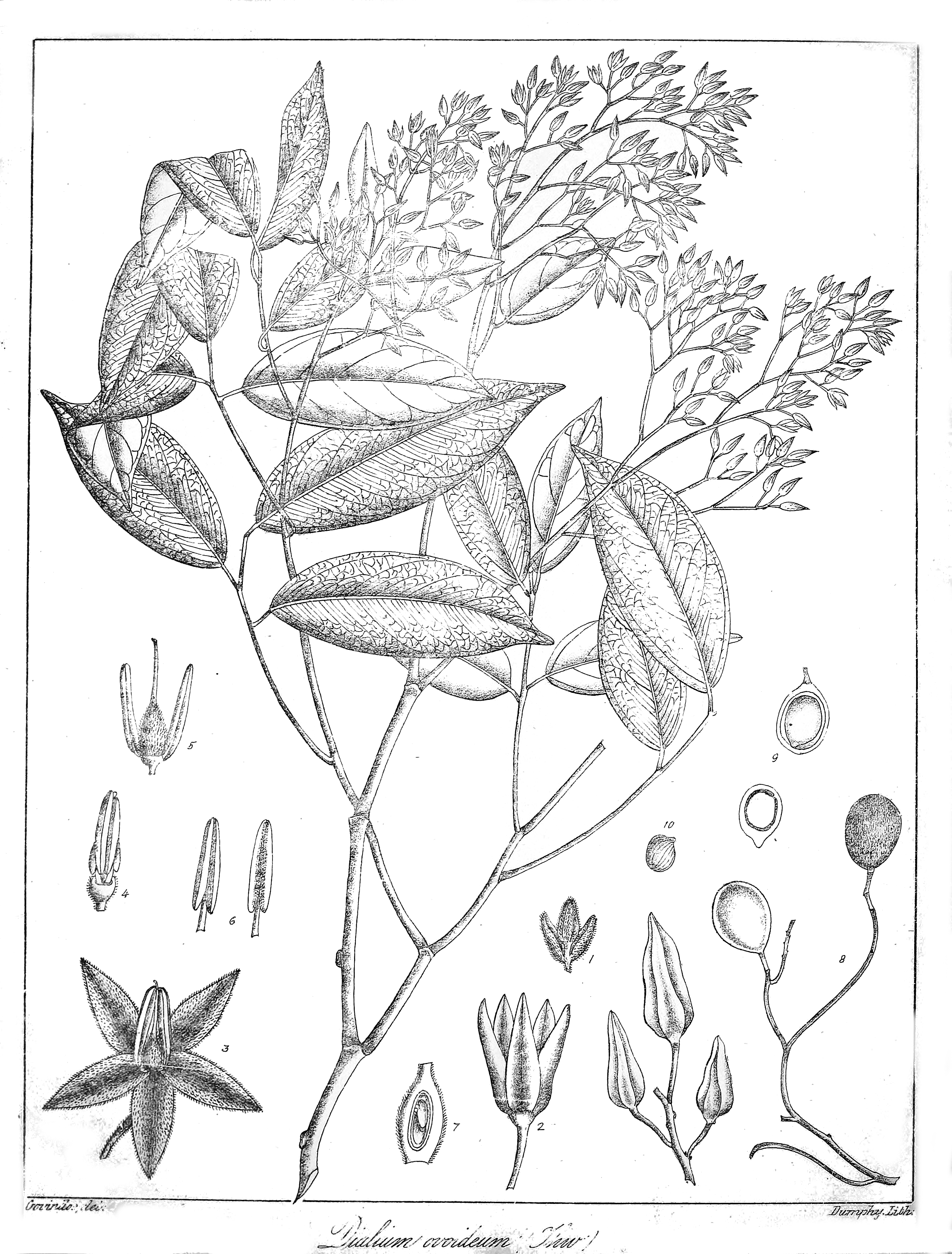

Scientific classification
- Kingdom: Plantae
- Clade: Tracheophytes
- Clade: Angiosperms
- Clade: Eudicots
- Clade: Rosids
- Order: Fabales
- Family: Fabaceae
- Genus: Dialium
- Species: D. ovoideum

Binomial name
- Dialium ovoideum Thw.

= Dialium ovoideum =

Species of legume

Dialium ovoideum is a tropical species of plant in the family Fabaceae. It is endemic to Sri Lanka. The Sinhala (Sri Lanka) name ගල් සියඹලා (gal siyambala) means "pebble tamarind" (ගල්: pebble-like/stone-like/hard). The Tamil name பட்டு புளியம் பழம் means "silky tamarind" which is named after the silky texture of the shell of the fruit. (பட்டு: velvet).

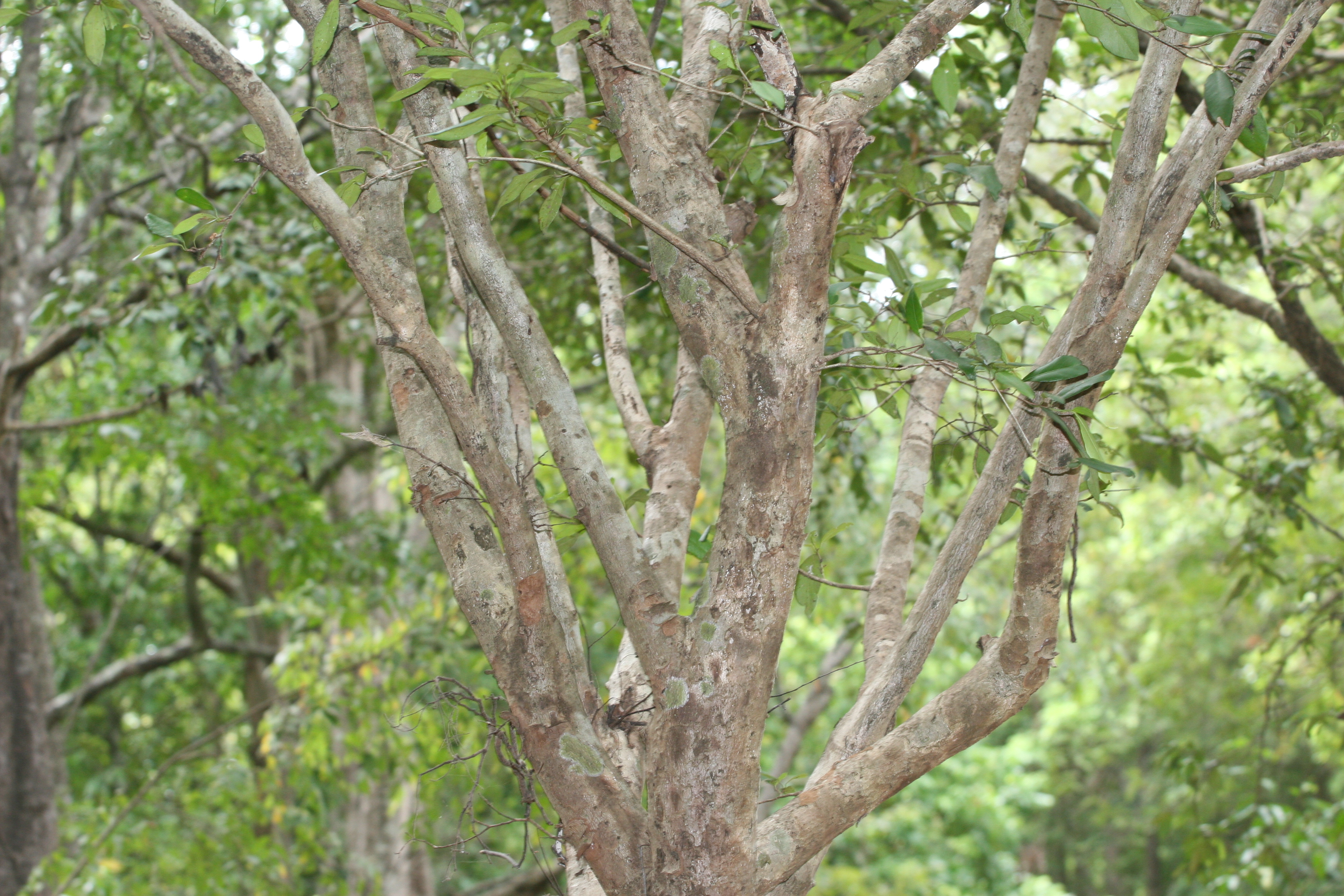
Stem

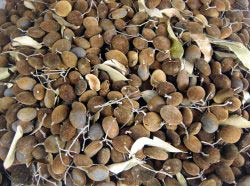
