= Heteroglenea =

Scientific classification
- Domain: Eukaryota
- Kingdom: Animalia
- Phylum: Arthropoda
- Class: Insecta
- Order: Coleoptera
- Suborder: Polyphaga
- Infraorder: Cucujiformia
- Family: Cerambycidae
- Subfamily: Lamiinae
- Tribe: Saperdini
- Genus: Heteroglenea; Gahan, 1897

Genus of beetles

Heteroglenea is a genus of longhorn beetles of the subfamily Lamiinae, containing the following species:

- Heteroglenea bastiensis (Breuning, 1956)
- Heteroglenea dolosa Lin & Yang, 2009
- Heteroglenea fissilis (Breuning, 1953)
- Heteroglenea gemella Lin & Yang, 2009
- Heteroglenea glechoma (Pascoe, 1867)
- Heteroglenea mediodiscoprolongata (Breuning, 1964)
- Heteroglenea momeitensis (Breuning, 1956)
- Heteroglenea nigromaculata (Thomson, 1865)
- Heteroglenea vicinalis Lin & Yang, 2009
