= Heteroglenea vicinalis =

Scientific classification
- Domain: Eukaryota
- Kingdom: Animalia
- Phylum: Arthropoda
- Class: Insecta
- Order: Coleoptera
- Suborder: Polyphaga
- Infraorder: Cucujiformia
- Family: Cerambycidae
- Genus: Heteroglenea
- Species: H. vicinalis

Binomial name
- Heteroglenea vicinalis Lin & Yang, 2009

Species of beetle

Heteroglenea vicinalis is a species of beetle in the family Cerambycidae. It was described by Lin and Yang in 2009. It is known from Nepal and India.
