= Dialium polyanthum =

Scientific classification
- Kingdom: Plantae
- Clade: Tracheophytes
- Clade: Angiosperms
- Clade: Eudicots
- Clade: Rosids
- Order: Fabales
- Family: Fabaceae
- Genus: Dialium
- Species: D. polyanthum

Binomial name
- Dialium polyanthum Harms

Synonyms
- Dialium aubrevillei Pellegr.; Dialium corbisieri Staner

Species of legume

Dialium polyanthum is a species of flowering plant, a medium to large tree in the family Fabaceae, subfamily Dialioideae.

The trees grow in flooded forest or on dry ground, on swamp- and stream sides, reaching 35 m in height with a bole up to 100 cm in diameter. which occurs in Congo-Brazzaville and Congo-Kinshasa, Gabon, Cabinda and Northern Angola.

== Uses ==
=== Wood ===
Also known as Dialium aubrevillei, its heavy, pinkish-brown wood, with a density of about 1020 kg/m³ at 12% moisture content, is very hard. The wood is locally used as firewood and for charcoal production, but it can also been used for construction.

=== Fruit ===
The fruits are used in traditional medicine.
