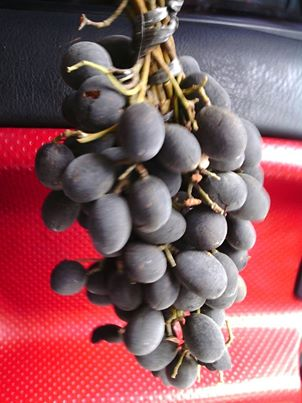
- Fruit

Conservation status
- Least Concern (IUCN 3.1)

Scientific classification
- Kingdom: Plantae
- Clade: Tracheophytes
- Clade: Angiosperms
- Clade: Eudicots
- Clade: Rosids
- Order: Fabales
- Family: Fabaceae
- Genus: Dialium
- Species: D. indum

Binomial name
- Dialium indum L.

Varieties
- Dialium indum var. bursa (de Wit) Rojo ex Kessler & Sidiyasa; Dialium indum var. indum

= Dialium indum =

Species of legume

Dialium indum, the tamarind-plum or velvet tamarind, is a tall, tropical, fruit-bearing tree. It belongs to the family Fabaceae, and has small, typically grape-sized edible fruits with brown hard inedible shells. No reports of cultivation exist, information on propagation is limited.

== Distribution ==
Dialium indum is native to Thailand, Malaysia, Kalimantan, Java and Sumatra.

== Names ==
In Indonesia and Malaysia it is called keranji.

== Uses ==
The bark and leaves have medicinal properties and are used against several diseases.

=== Fruit ===
The flavor of the fruit is similar to tamarind, where it derives its English name. Usually has a sweet-sour taste. Compared to tamarind, it is sweeter, dryer, powder-like and the shell is thicker.

The fruit is used as a candy-like snack food in Thailand, often dried, sugar-coated and spiced with chili. The dried fruit has a powdery texture, and is orange in color with a tangy flavor.

The fruit is also very popular in Côte d'Ivoire, Sierra Leone, Ghana, Nigeria and Senegal.

Each fruit typically has one hard, flat, round, brown seed, typically 7-8 millimeters across and 3 millimeters thick. The seed somewhat resembles a watermelon seed (Citrullus lanatus). Some have two seeds. The seeds are shiny, coated with a thin layer of starch.

In Sarawak, Malaysia there are at least two varieties for sale in the local markets. Both have the same thin black brittle shell, and appear to be naturally dry unlike most fruits. One smaller kind is about one inch (25 mm) long and has a reddish-brown powder lightly packed around the single seed, with a small air space within the shell. This powder tastes sweet and sour just like the candy "sweet-tarts", and is thus closest to the tamarind. The second are bigger, about 1 1/2 inches (38 mm) long and look the same outside but are pretty different inside. There is more empty space in these and the pulp is 2–3 mm thick around the seed (sometimes 2 seeds), brown and a bit sticky, and tastes like a mixture of three parts good date, one part raisins, and one part wheat flour. There is locally also at least one more wild keranji, which is also of the powder sort, but too acidic to enjoy.
