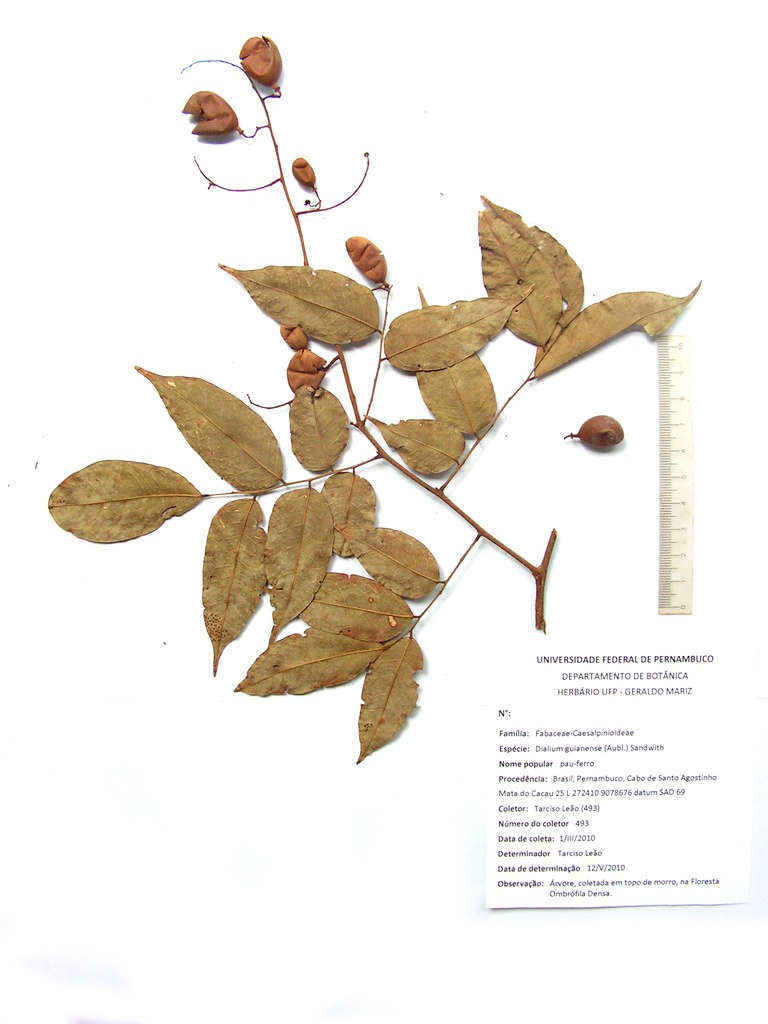

Conservation status
- Least Concern (IUCN 3.1)

Scientific classification
- Kingdom: Plantae
- Clade: Tracheophytes
- Clade: Angiosperms
- Clade: Eudicots
- Clade: Rosids
- Order: Fabales
- Family: Fabaceae
- Genus: Dialium
- Species: D. guianense

Binomial name
- Dialium guianense (Aubl.) Sandwith

Synonyms
- Arouna divaricatum Willd.; Arouna guianensis Aubl.; Dialium divaricatum (Willd.) Vahl

= Dialium guianense =

Species of tree in the flowering plant family Fabaceae

Dialium guianense is a species of tree in the flowering plant family Fabaceae. The species occurs through North America (South Eastern Mexico), Central America and South America, and was an important source of food and wood for the ancient Mayans.

== Common names ==
In English the common name for this species is ironwood, a name shared with many other plants. In Mexico the common name is Guapaque. In Colombia the common name is Granadillo or Tamarindo de montaña (in English "Wild tamarind"; "montaña" means "jungle" in this context).

== Description ==
Dialium guianense is a broad or compound leaved tree growing up to 31–35 m (102–115 ft) tall. It bears a single seeded (rarely, two seeded) edible fruit; the taste is said to be similar to tamarind.

== Distribution and habitat ==
It is from South America to Central America.

It is native to Belize, Bolivia, Brazil, Colombia, Costa Rica, Ecuador, Guatemala, Guyana, Honduras, Mexico, Nicaragua, Panamá, Peru, Suriname, Venezuela as well as the territory of French Guiana. The species was also introduced to Cuba and Puerto Rico.

In Suriname the species regularly occurs in humid forests. In Belize the species is abundant in swampy forests but it can also be found in dry areas.

== Uses ==
The wood from the trees is valued for the construction of railroads, fence posts, and house frames. In Tabasco and Chiapas its fruit is used for preparing beverages and also some kind of sweet paste with sugar. It has also been used for flooring and bridges. In Mexico the tree is valued as a source for food.
