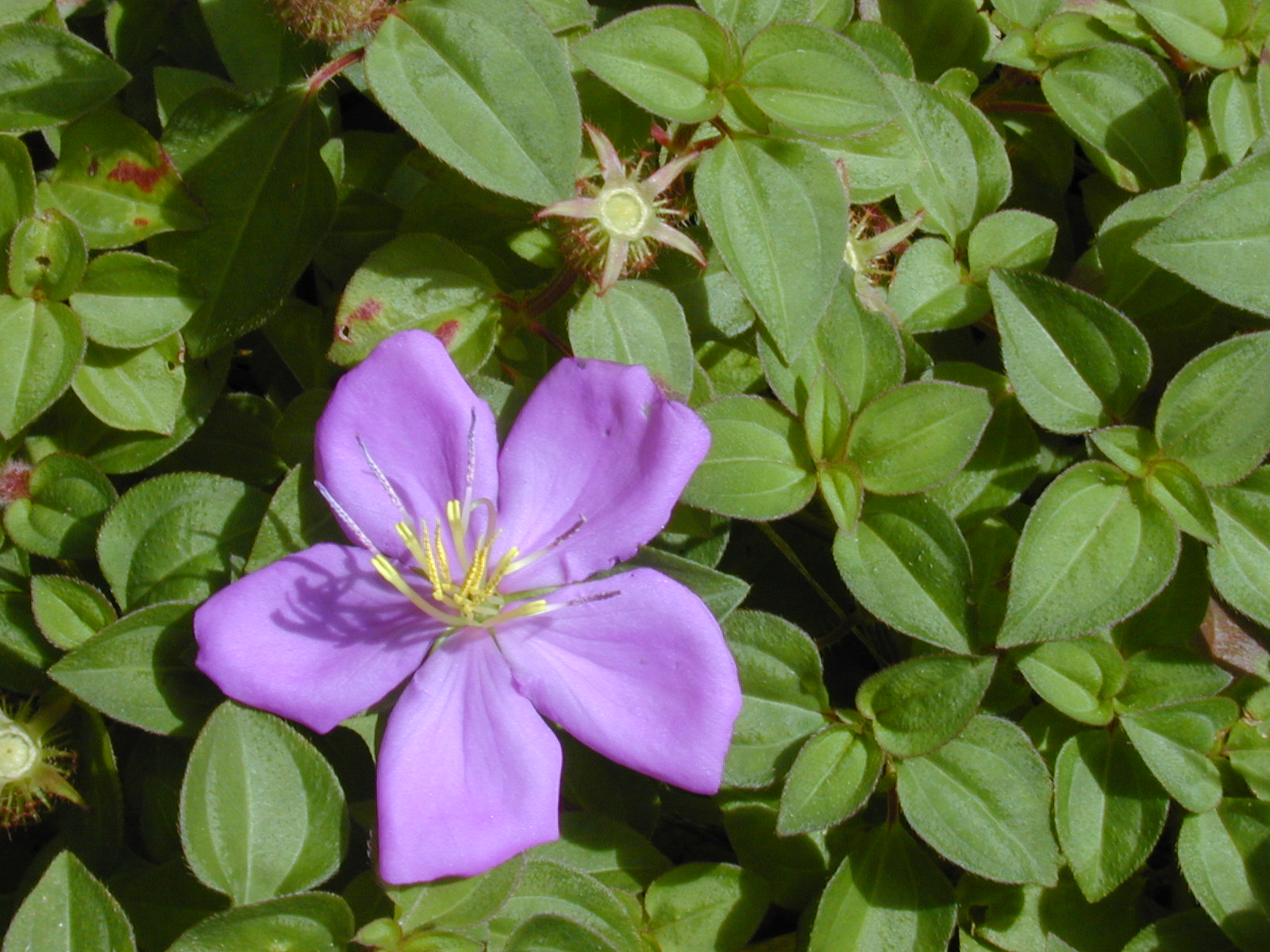

Scientific classification
- Kingdom: Plantae
- Clade: Embryophytes
- Clade: Tracheophytes
- Clade: Angiosperms
- Clade: Eudicots
- Clade: Rosids
- Order: Myrtales
- Family: Melastomataceae
- Genus: Heterotis
- Species: H. rotundifolia

Binomial name
- Heterotis rotundifolia (Sm.) Jacq.-Fél. (1981)

Synonyms
- Asterostoma rotundifolia Blume (1849); Dissotis plumosa (D.Don) Hook f. (1871); Dissotis rotundifolia (Sm.) Triana (1871 publ. 1872); Heterotis plumosa (D.Don) Benth. (1849); Kadalia rotundifolia Raf. (1838); Melastoma plumosum D.Don (1823), nom. illeg.; Osbeckia rotundifolia Sm. (1813)

= Heterotis rotundifolia =

Species of flowering plant

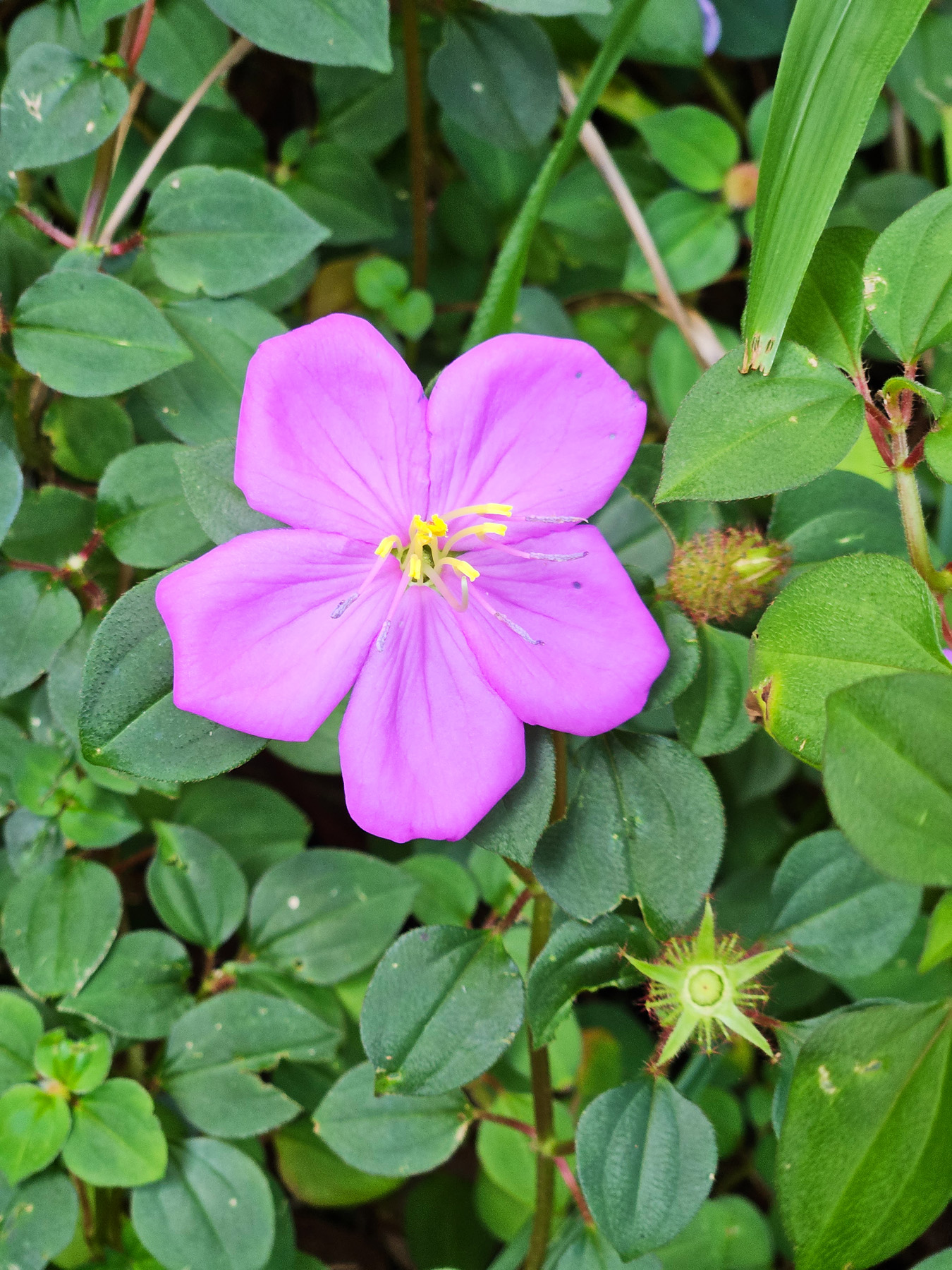
Heterotis rotundifolia (Hawaii, Maui)

Heterotis rotundifolia, commonly called pink lady, Spanish shawl, or rockrose, is a shrub in the family Melastomataceae that occurs in tropical Africa.

== Description ==
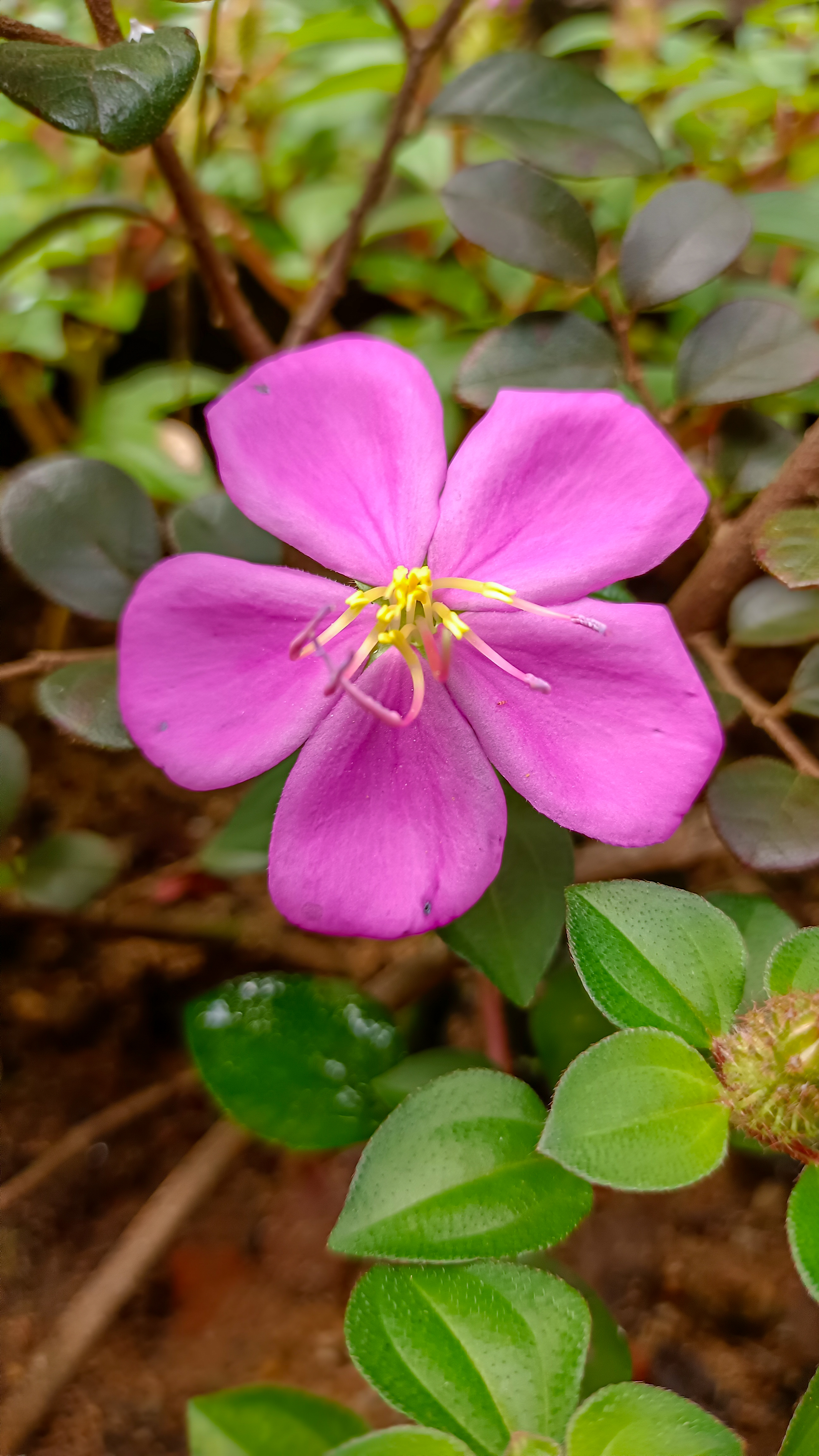
Flower of Heterotis rotundifolia in Kerala

Heterotis rotundifolia can grow in a variety of ways, from straight up and erect to lying flat and prostrate to decumbent, meaning the branches lie flat on the ground but turn up at the ends. When the stems trail, they root where the leaf connects to the stem, called the "node". The stems are woody on lower parts of the plant and become hirsute, meaning hairy, towards the top of the plant. The branches tend to spread wide, and range from pink to a dark reddish in color.

The leaves are oval shaped and three-ribbed, being 1–3 cm (0.39–1.18 in) long and 6–15 mm (0.24–0.59 in) wide. They are covered with short, appressed hairs on both sides. The stalks of the leaves are as long as 1.5 cm (0.59 in), pilose, and pink.

The flowers of Heterotis rotundifolia are solitary, and the stalks of the flowers, like the leaves, are covered with tiny appressed hairs. The petals of the flower are 1.5–2 cm (0.59–0.79 in) in length and range from pink to a pale purple in color.

== Habitat and ecology ==
Heterotis rotundifolia is native to Africa, occurring naturally in central and western Africa from Sierra Leone to Zaire. It has been introduced as a ground cover and ornamental plant to other tropical areas such as Hawaii, Malaysia, and the West Indies, and has become naturalised in some topical parts of Australia. The shrub can grow at elevations from sea level to about 1,900 m (6,200 ft) above sea level.

== Uses ==
The leaves of Heterotis rotundifolia are used as a spice for sauces and as a potherb. In Liberia, the plant is used as a diuretic.
