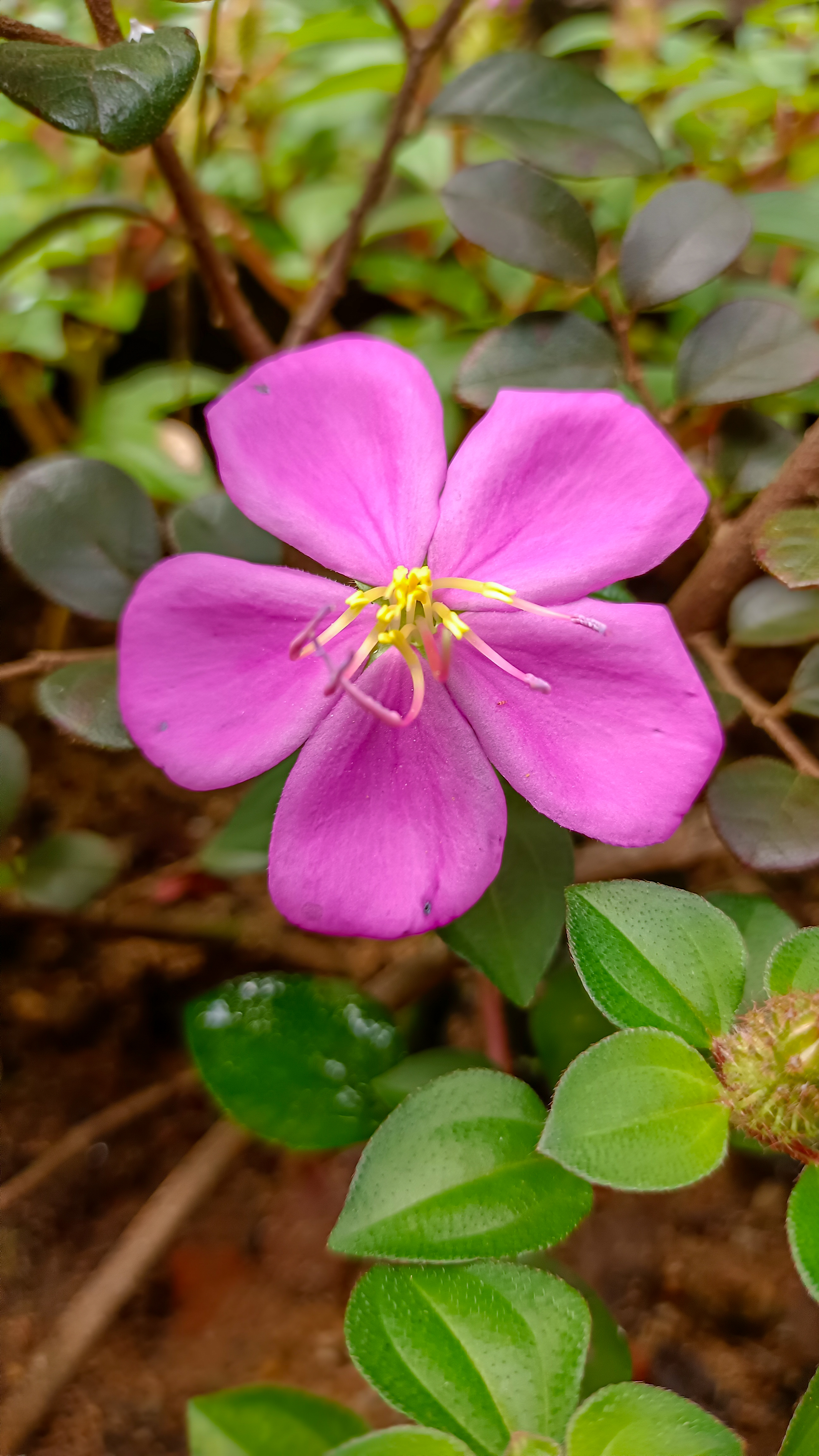
- Heterotis rotundifolia

Scientific classification
- Kingdom: Plantae
- Clade: Tracheophytes
- Clade: Angiosperms
- Clade: Eudicots
- Clade: Rosids
- Order: Myrtales
- Family: Melastomataceae
- Genus: Heterotis; Benth. (1849)

Species
- See text

Synonyms
- Lepidanthemum Klotzsch (1861)

= Heterotis (plant) =

Genus of flowering plants

Heterotis is a genus of flowering plants belonging to the family Melastomataceae.

The genus is native to tropical Africa.

There are 6 accepted species in this genus. Some taxonomists include this genus and its species in the genus Dissotis.

- Heterotis buettneriana (Cogn. ex Büttner) Jacq.-Fél.
- Heterotis cogniauxiana (A.Fern. & R.Fern.) Ver.-Lib. & G.Kadereit
- Heterotis decumbens (P.Beauv.) Jacq.-Fél.
- Heterotis fruticosa (Brenan) Ver.-Lib. & G.Kadereit
- Heterotis prostrata Benth.
- Heterotis rotundifolia (Sm.) Jacq.-Fél.
