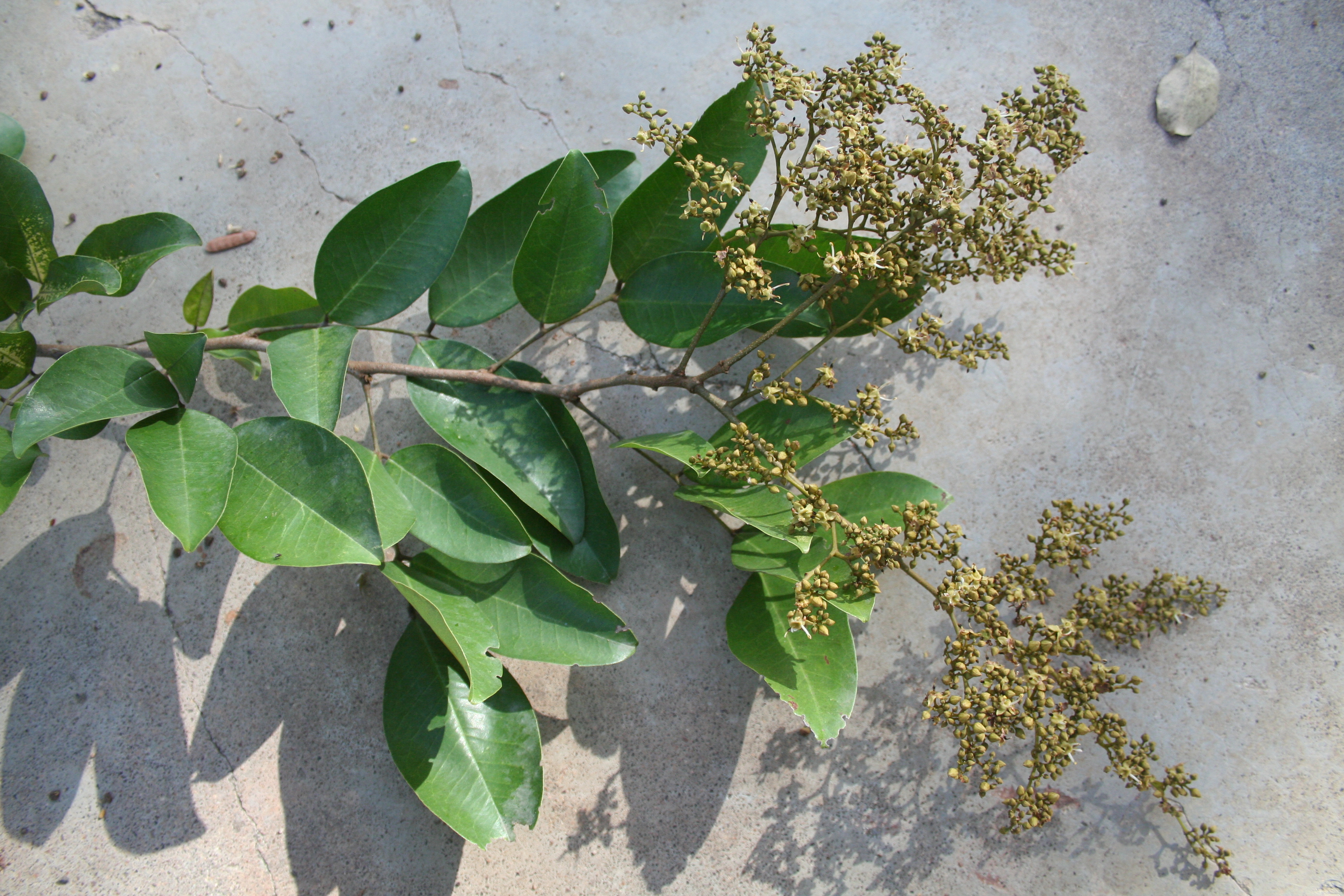

Conservation status
- Least Concern (IUCN 3.1)

Scientific classification
- Kingdom: Plantae
- Clade: Tracheophytes
- Clade: Angiosperms
- Clade: Eudicots
- Clade: Rosids
- Order: Fabales
- Family: Fabaceae
- Genus: Dialium
- Species: D. guineense

Binomial name
- Dialium guineense Willd.

Synonyms
- Codarium acutifolium Afzel.; Codarium discolor DC.; Codarium nitidum Sol. ex Vahl; Codarium obtusifolium Afzel.; Codarium solanderi Vahl; Dialium anomalum Webb; Dialium discolor Hook.f.; Dialium nitidum (Sol. ex Vahl) Guill. & Perr.

= Dialium guineense =

Species of legume

Dialium guineense, the velvet tamarind, is a tall, tropical, fruit-bearing tree in the family Fabaceae. It has small, typically grape-sized, edible fruits with brown, hard, inedible shells.

== Distribution and habitat ==
Dialium guineense is native to West Africa, from Senegal east to the Democratic Republic of the Congo. It grows in dense forests along the southern edge of the Sahel.

== Uses ==
The bark and leaves have medicinal properties and are used against several diseases. For example, it is a component of the Nigerian mixture Aju Mbaise, and it helps soothe coughs and toothaches.

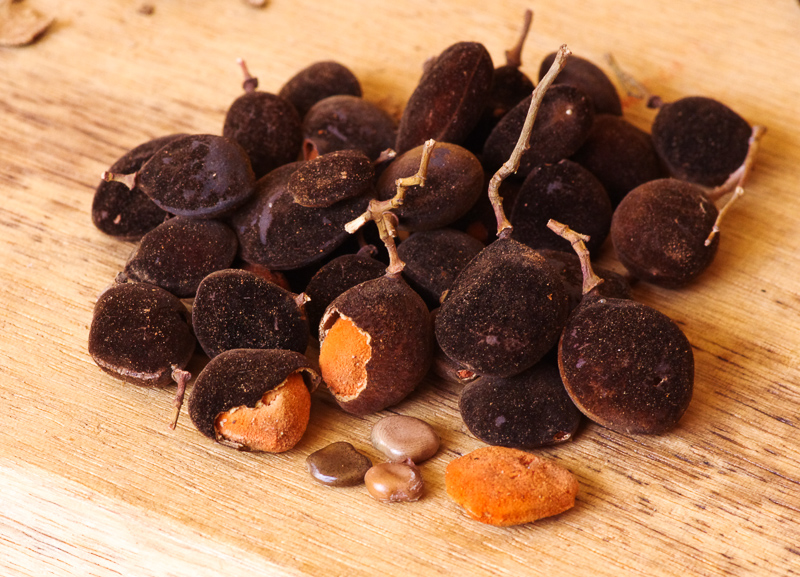
Fruit

=== Fruit ===
Each fruit typically has one hard, flat, round, brown seed, typically 7–8 mm (0.28–0.31 in) across and 3 mm (0.12 in) thick. The seed somewhat resembles a watermelon seed (Citrullus lanatus). Some have two seeds. The seeds are shiny, coated with a thin layer of starch.

The pulp is edible and may be eaten raw or soaked in water and consumed as a beverage. The bitter leaves are ingredients in a Ghanaian dish called domoda.

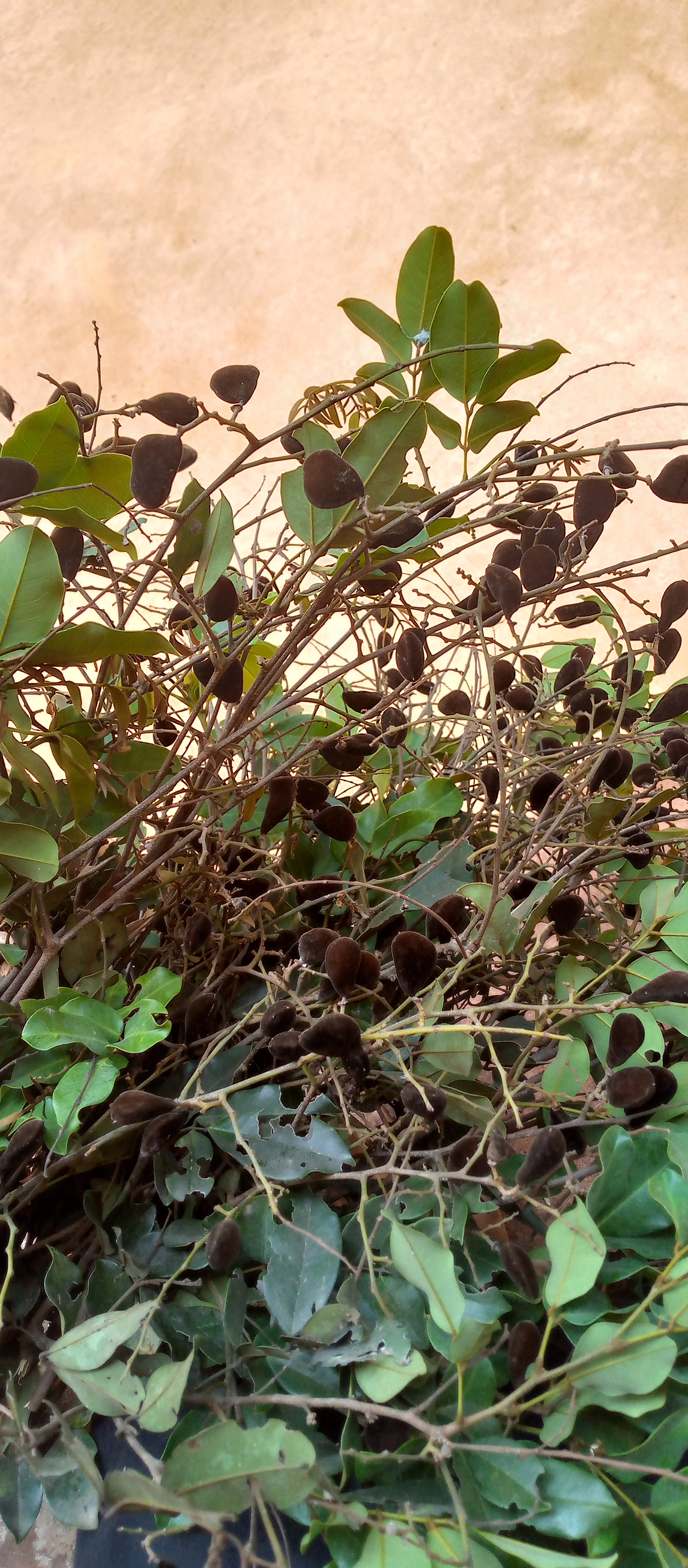
African Velvet tamarind

=== Timber ===
Wood is hard and heavy and used for construction. The wood is also used for firewood and charcoal production.
