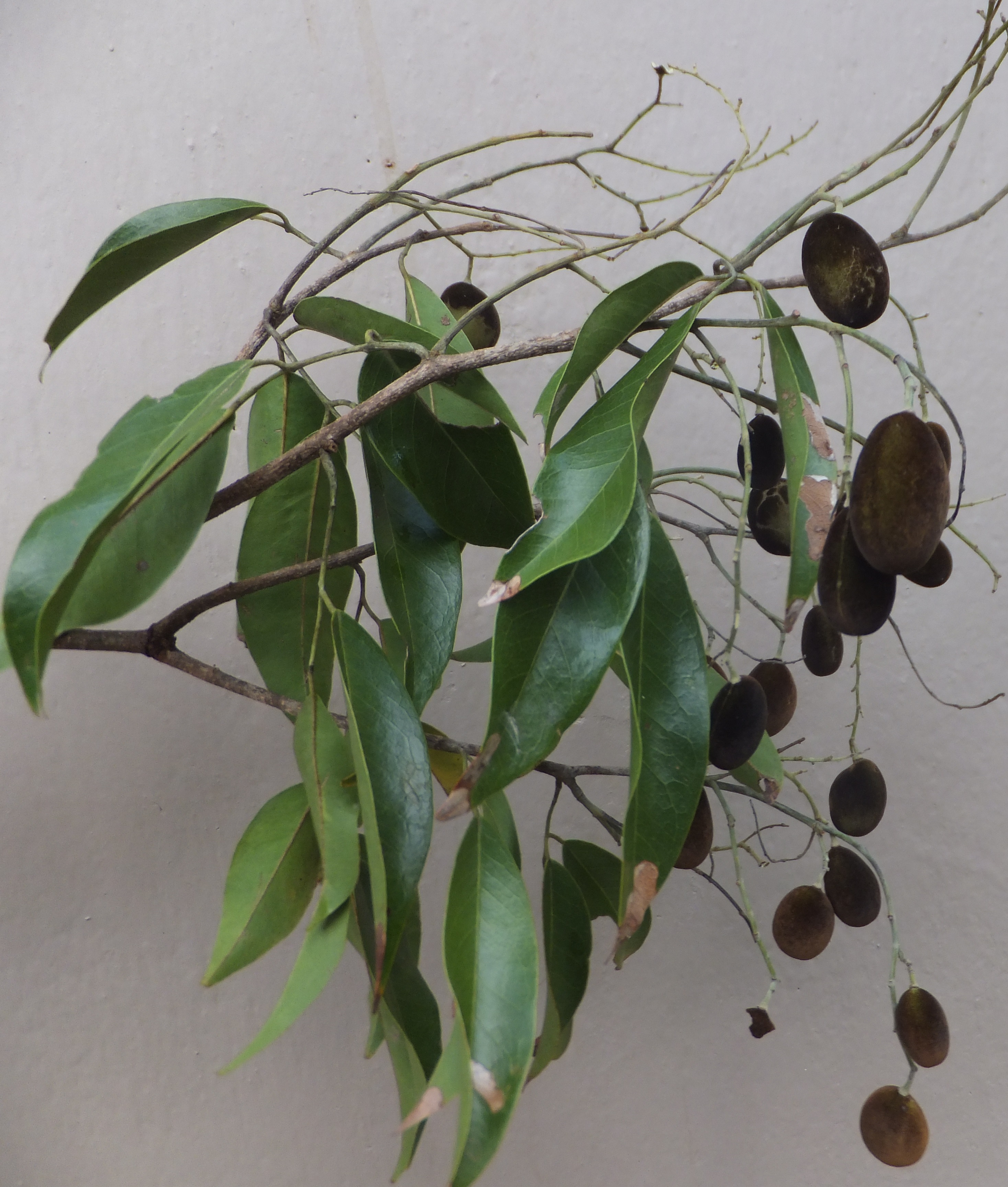

Conservation status
- Near Threatened (IUCN 2.3)

Scientific classification
- Kingdom: Plantae
- Clade: Tracheophytes
- Clade: Angiosperms
- Clade: Eudicots
- Clade: Rosids
- Order: Fabales
- Family: Fabaceae
- Genus: Dialium
- Species: D. cochinchinense

Binomial name
- Dialium cochinchinense Pierre

= Dialium cochinchinense =

Species of flowering plant

Dialium cochinchinense, the velvet tamarind, is a species of flowering plant in the family Fabaceae. It is native to Borneo and Indochina (Cambodia, Laos, Malaysia, Myanmar, Thailand, Vietnam), but may have been introduced to Sri Lanka, Sierra Leone, Ghana, Nigeria and other west African countries. (or may be confused with other species in the genus Dialium). In the wild, it is threatened by habitat loss.

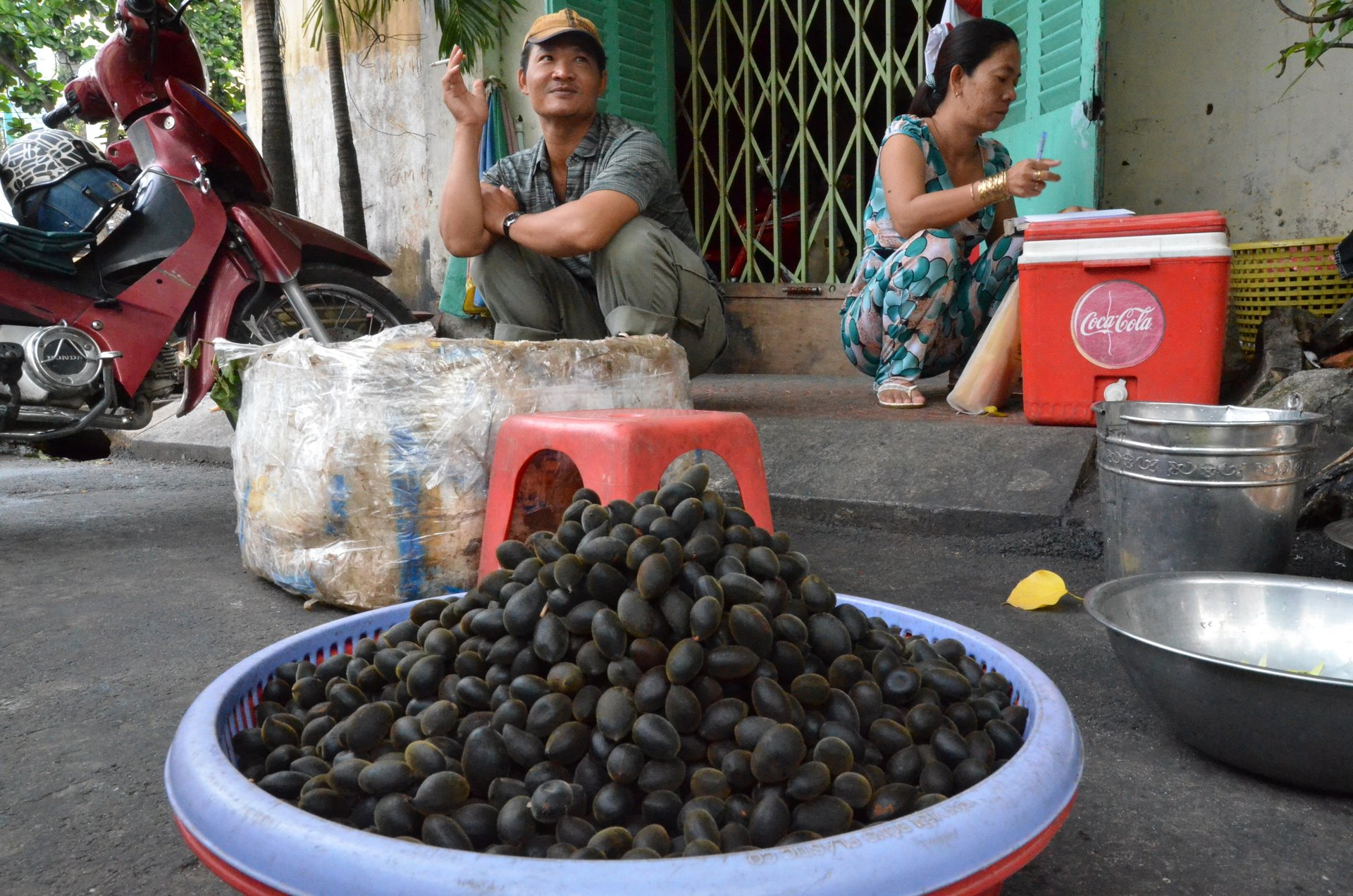
Dialium cochinchinense fruit at a market in Ho Chi Minh City
