= Menem trucho =

Series of banknotes of no value with the face of Argentine President Carlos Menem

Menem trucho is the popular name given to a series of banknotes of no value with the face of Argentine President Carlos Menem and propaganda phrases that were distributed through street promoters and basic units in the early 1990s in Argentina. With the symbolic title of A value that stabilized the country and Ten years of stability, they were created as a propaganda policy by the then President of Argentina Carlos Menem. Despite the obvious falsity of the bill there were those who used it to pay for purchases in neighboring countries such as Bolivia and Paraguay.

== Origin of the name ==
The word trucho is an Argentine slang for fake, the fact that they were not legal tender and had no monetary value, they were baptized Menem-truchos.

== Controversy ==
The banknote was printed in true paper money and includes a Watermark with the Coat of arms of Argentina, celebrating the 60th birthday of the President. This issue, was done by the Casa de Moneda de la República Argentina, a state society of which Armando Gostanian was the highest authority; he was investigated for public embezzlement, but was ultimately dismissed.
