= John Joseph Jolly Kyle =

Argentine chemist (1838–1922)

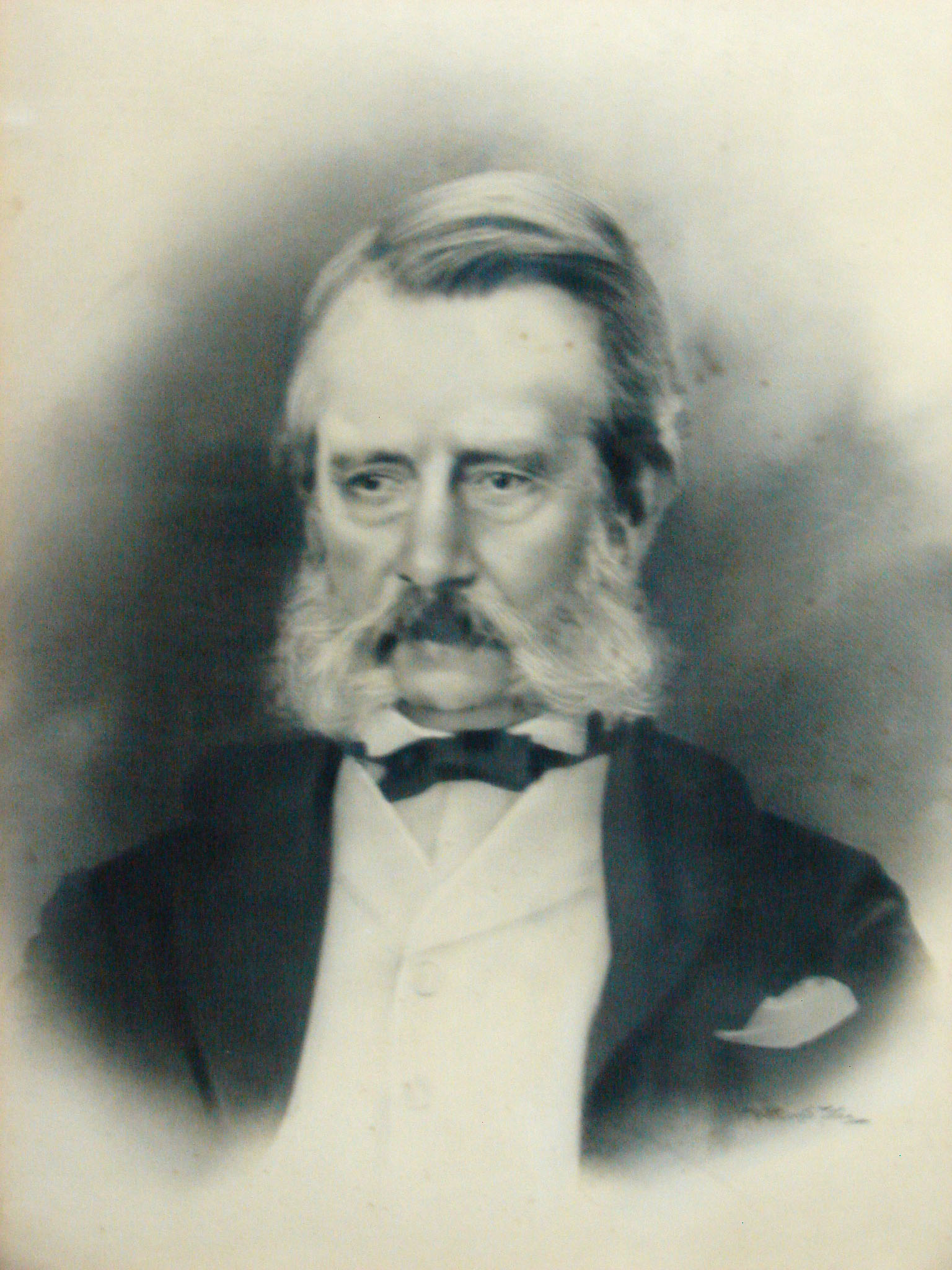
- J.J.J. Kyle, 1881
- Born: February 2, 1838; Stirling, Scotland
- Died: February 23, 1922 (aged 84); Buenos Aires, Argentina
- Occupations: Chemist, professor at the University of Buenos Aires

John Joseph Jolly Kyle FRSA (2 February 1838 – 23 February 1922) was a pioneering Argentine chemist. Born and educated in Scotland, he emigrated to Argentina in 1862, and on the outbreak of the Paraguayan War served as a pharmacist in the Argentine Army medical corps. He became an Argentine citizen in 1873. At the time Kyle was active specialisation was not an option in Latin American chemistry and it was necessary for a chemist to be a sort of polymath or jack-of-all-trades. Kyle was appointed professor of chemistry at the Colegio Nacional de Buenos Aires in 1871, and chief chemist to the Casa de Moneda de la República Argentina (the Argentine Mint) in 1881. He was appointed professor of organic chemistry at the University of Buenos Aires (1889); Chemist to the Inspectorate-General of Sanitary Works (1890); professor of industrial chemistry at the Colegio Nacional (1892); and professor of inorganic chemistry at Buenos Aires University (1896). He was director of the first chemistry doctoral thesis in Argentina (1901).

The Dr. Juan J. J. Kyle Award, awarded quinquennially by the Argentine Chemical Association for the best contribution to any branch of chemistry, and its most prestigious prize, is named in his honour.

== Early life ==
Kyle was born in Stirling, Scotland on 2 February 1838. He completed an apprenticeship with an Edinburgh pharmacy in 1854 and became assistant to Dr Stevenson Macadam, lecturer in chemistry to Surgeons' Hall, Edinburgh. He made his first scientific discovery at the age of 18. Moving to the field of industrial chemistry, he was head of the chemical laboratory of Glasgow University and then manager of an animal charcoal manufacturer in Greenock. He was a fellow of the Royal Society of Arts.

He emigrated to Argentina in July 1862. When President-Marshall Solano Lopez of Paraguay invaded Corrientes Province in 1865 there broke out the War of the Triple Alliance and Kyle joined the medical corps of the Argentine Army as a pharmacist with the rank of lieutenant. He participated in the siege of Uruguaiana (where the defenders were reduced to living on lump sugar), the three-day battle of the Boquerón and in the Battle of Tuyutí, the bloodiest international battle in the history of South America. He served on board the hospital ship Pavón and returned to Buenos Aires in December 1866 in charge of a convoy of wounded soldiers. His wartime experiences led him to take a foundational interest in the Argentine Red Cross Society, of which he was made an honorary member in 1896.

== Work ==
By the time of his retirement in 1906 he had published some 65 chemical papers, most of them in the Spanish language, on such diverse topics as the chemical compositions of Argentine rivers, the medicinal plants of Córdoba Province, Argentina, the incrustation of locomotive boilers, the presence of organic matter in drinking water, the caffeine content of yerba mate, the adulteration of saffron, the wines of the Argentine Republic, compositions of meteorites fallen in Buenos Aires Province, Patagonian guano, the petroleum of Jujuy Province, a new alkaloid he isolated from Ruprechtia salicifolia, Cape Virgins gold, Tierra del Fuego platinum, well water, the cement of a failed dam, the destruction of masonry by cloacal gases, and a silver-yielding manganese ore from Mendoza Province.

According to Rapela and Depetris, Kyle was the first Argentine geochemist. Of his papers,

The most relevant are those related to the characteristics and composition of ground waters in the province of Buenos Aires. Along with studies on the best location for groundwater wells, he advised on the collection of freshwater from rivers to supply the city of Buenos Aires

On a vanadiferous lignite found in the Argentine Republic with analysis of the ash was read before the British Association Edinburgh meeting in 1892. His last work, published in Ambrosetti, El bronce en la region calchaquí established that the Calchaquí Amerindians were a Bronze Age people. He died in Buenos Aires on 23 February 1922.
