= SOL3 =

- Company type: Private
- Industry: Footwear accessories
- Founded: 2016
- Headquarters: Philadelphia, PA, United States
- Area served: Worldwide
- Products: Insoles, Shoe trees, Shoelaces, Shoe polish, Socks
- Website: sol3.com

SOL3 is an American footwear company that designs and produces shoe accessories, which range from manufacturing inserts such as crease protectors and insoles to various basic shoe care items including shoelaces, deodorizer, waterproof spray and sneaker cleaner.

== History ==
Based in Philadelphia and founded as of late-2016, SOL3 has released a wide assortment of footwear products globally that currently retail in North America, Europe, Australia and Asia. The company first began distributing and shipping product internationally in October 2016 with the launch of the original ternary adjustable shoe insert that could be modified to increase elevation from 1 to 2.36 inches. As of December 2017, SOL3 sold an estimated 50,000 units of the 3-Level Insole after its first year of operation. In 2018, The 3-Level Insole was named “Footwear Accessory of the Year” by Sneakscore.
