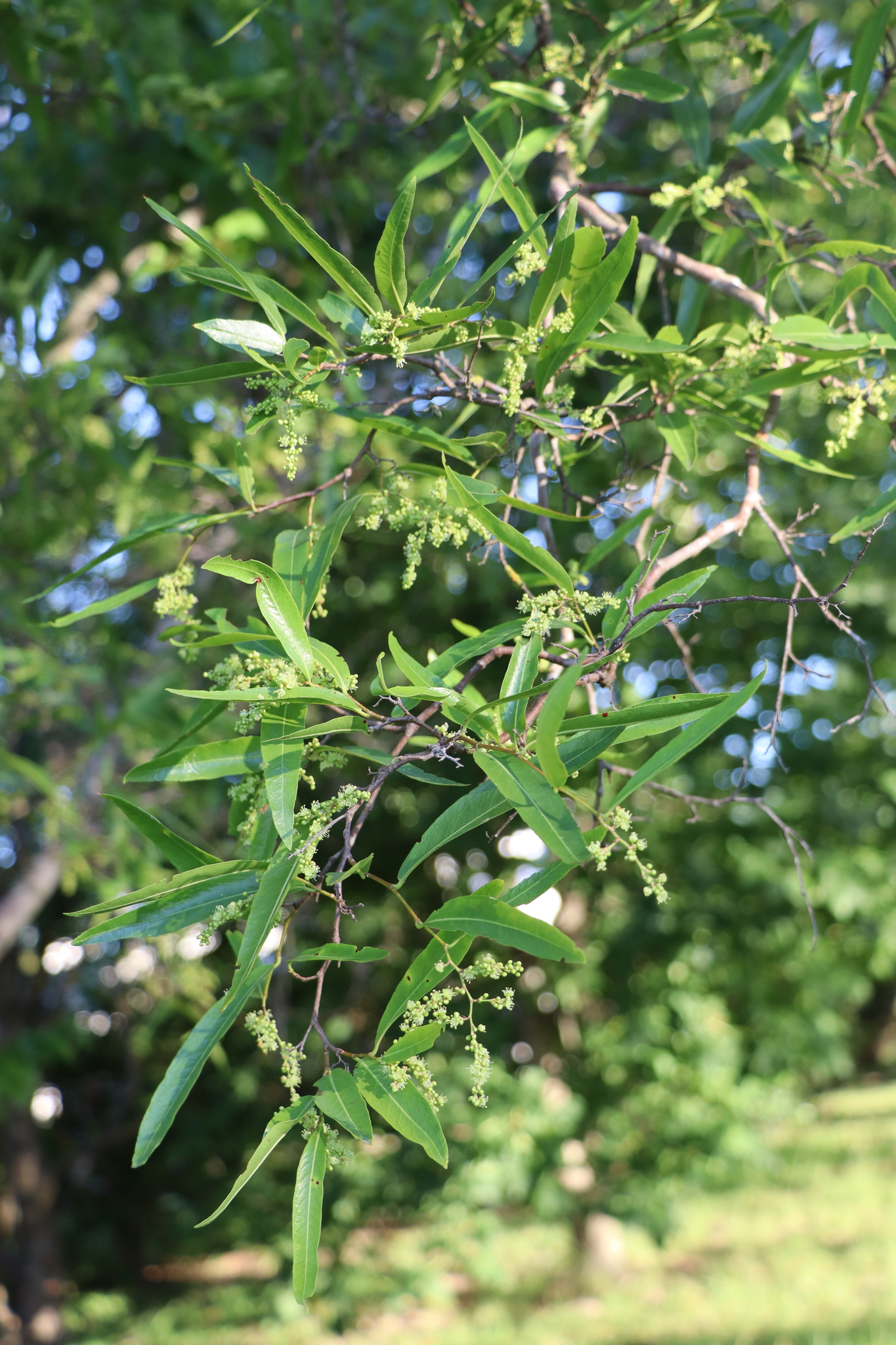

Scientific classification
- Kingdom: Plantae
- Clade: Tracheophytes
- Clade: Angiosperms
- Clade: Eudicots
- Order: Caryophyllales
- Family: Polygonaceae
- Genus: Ruprechtia
- Species: R. salicifolia

Binomial name
- Ruprechtia salicifolia (Cham. et Schlecht.) C. A. Mey

= Ruprechtia salicifolia =

Viraró

South American timber tree

Ruprechtia salicifolia (native name viraró) is a timber tree native to South America. Its wood withstands decay and is good for making springboards and other articles.

== Description ==
A thicket-forming shrub or dioecious tree native to South America, it is a perennial phanerogamous or seed producing plant in the Polygonaceae family.

It grows to a height of about 4–6 m (exceptionally, 10 m). It has a somewhat tortuous trunk with visible lenticels and is highly branched. Its foliage is deciduous, with simple, alternating, lanceolate 9–16 cm long leaves and a shiny upper surface. It has small paniculate male flowers and racemoid female flowers. It begins to flower in spring. Its fruit is a chestnut-coloured, splined rhomboid achene. It fruits in summer — with a notable presence that covers the treetop — and ripens in autumn.

A detailed, open access description by Pendry is available online. Pendry says salicifolia is unmistakable in the Ruprechtia genus "because of its long, narrowly ovate leaves, which have the highest length:width ratio".

=== Synonyms ===
Kew Plants of the World Online accepts these homotypic synonyms:

- Magonia salicifolia
- Triplans salicifolia.

== Common names ==
R. salicifolia is known locally as viraró or iviraró. The former name is also applied to the similar species R. laxiflora. In Brazil both are known as marmeleiro-do-mato (bush quince).

== Habitat ==
It thrives on the banks of rivers and streams. One source says it is native to the banks of the Uruguay River and its tributaries.

== Distribution ==
Northeast Argentina, Brazil (Rio Grande do Sul), Uruguay.

== Use ==
It furnishes an excellent hard timber (relative density 0.62-0.70) that resists decay and is siliceous (thus it blunts edged tools, but withstands mollusc and crustacean attack). It is used in coachwork, boatbuilding, bearings, tools, beams, springboards, goal posts, shoe trees, fine folded furniture, cabinet making, walking sticks, tobacco pipes, carvings, kitchen mortars, and other woodwork. It is used for making plywood.

Ziliani attributes the mature wood's hardness and resistance to decay in aquatic environments (notably in the presence of the naval shipworm) to its silica content, a feature found in timbers with similar properties.

Because of its affinity for river bank thickets it has been suggested for planting for erosion defence.

== Sources ==
- Carrere, Ricardo (1990). "Anexo No 1: Caracteristicas y usos de las maderas indigenas". El bosque natural uruguayo: utilización tradicional y usos alternativos (in Spanish).
- Marchiori, J.N.C.; Sabin, L. dos S. (2014). "Identificação botânica de Ruprechtia salicifolia (Cham. & Schltdl.) C.A. Mey". Balduinia (in Portuguese). 20: 1–4. doi:10.5902/2358198014091.
- Pendry, Colin A. (2004). "Monograph of Ruprechtia (Polygonaceae)". Systematic Botany Monographs. Vol. 67. American Society of Plant Taxonomists. pp. 1–113. JSTOR 25027911.
- Piaggio, Mario; Delfino, Liliana (2003). "Ruprechtia salicifolia (Cham. et Schlecht.) C. A. Mey". Planta Nativas del Uruguay (in Spanish).
- Royal Botanic Gardens, Kew. "Ruprechtia salicifolia". Plants of the World Online.
- Ziliani, Gonzalo (1987). "Presencia de Silice en maderas de especies arbóreas del Uruguay". Boletín de Investigación (in Spanish) (6). Udelar, FA. ISSN 0797-0315.

== Acknowledgement ==
The first edition of this article was a translation of its counterpart in Spanish Wikipedia.
