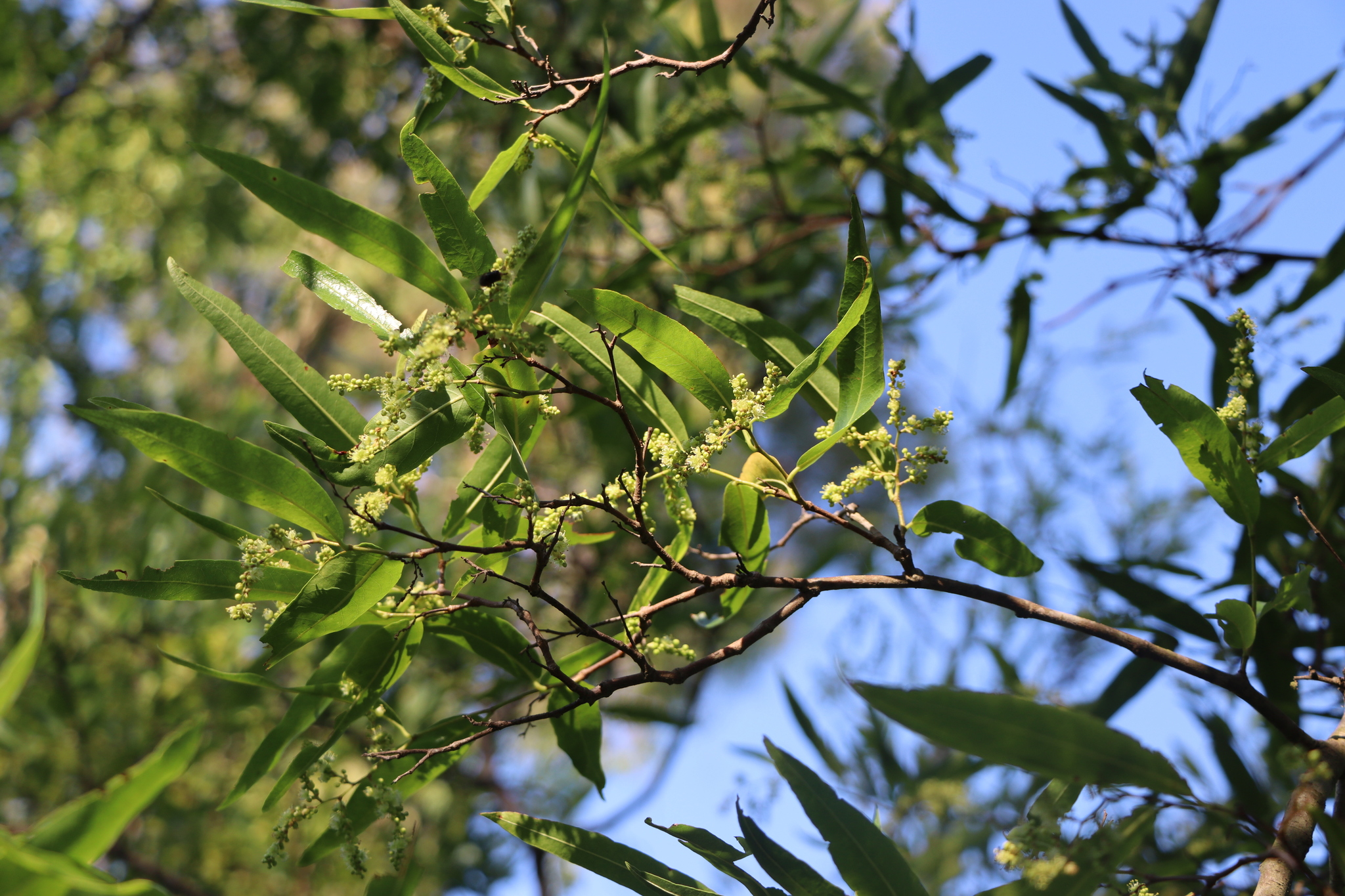
- Ruprechtia salicifolia

Scientific classification
- Kingdom: Plantae
- Clade: Tracheophytes
- Clade: Angiosperms
- Clade: Eudicots
- Order: Caryophyllales
- Family: Polygonaceae
- Subfamily: Eriogonoideae
- Tribe: Triplarideae
- Genus: Ruprechtia; C.A.Mey.

Synonyms
- Magonia Vell.

= Ruprechtia =

Genus of plants

Ruprechtia is a genus of plant in family Polygonaceae. It includes 31 species native to the tropical Americas, from Mexico through Central America, the southern Caribbean, and South America to northern Argentina.

== Species ==
31 species are accepted.

- Ruprechtia albida Pendry
- Ruprechtia aperta Pendry
- Ruprechtia apetala Wedd.
- Ruprechtia apurensis Pendry
- Ruprechtia brachysepala Meisn.
- Ruprechtia brachystachya Benth.
- Ruprechtia carina Pendry
- Ruprechtia chiapensis Lundell ex Standl. & Steyerm.
- Ruprechtia costaricensis Pendry
- Ruprechtia costata Meisn.
- Ruprechtia crenata (Casar.) R.A.Howard
- Ruprechtia cruegeri Griseb. ex Lindau
- Ruprechtia curranii S.F.Blake
- Ruprechtia exploratricis Sandwith
- Ruprechtia fusca Fernald
- Ruprechtia glauca Meisn.
- Ruprechtia howardiana Aymard & P.E.Berry
- Ruprechtia jamesonii Meisn.
- Ruprechtia laevigata Pendry
- Ruprechtia latifunda Pendry
- Ruprechtia laxiflora Meisn.
- Ruprechtia lundii Meisn.
- Ruprechtia maracaensis Brandbyge
- Ruprechtia nicaraguensis Pendry
- Ruprechtia obovata Pendry
- Ruprechtia pallida Standl.
- Ruprechtia paranensis Pendry
- Ruprechtia peruviana Pendry
- Ruprechtia salicifolia (Cham. & Schltdl.) C.A.Mey., native name viraró.
- Ruprechtia standleyana Cocucci
- Ruprechtia tangarana Standl.
