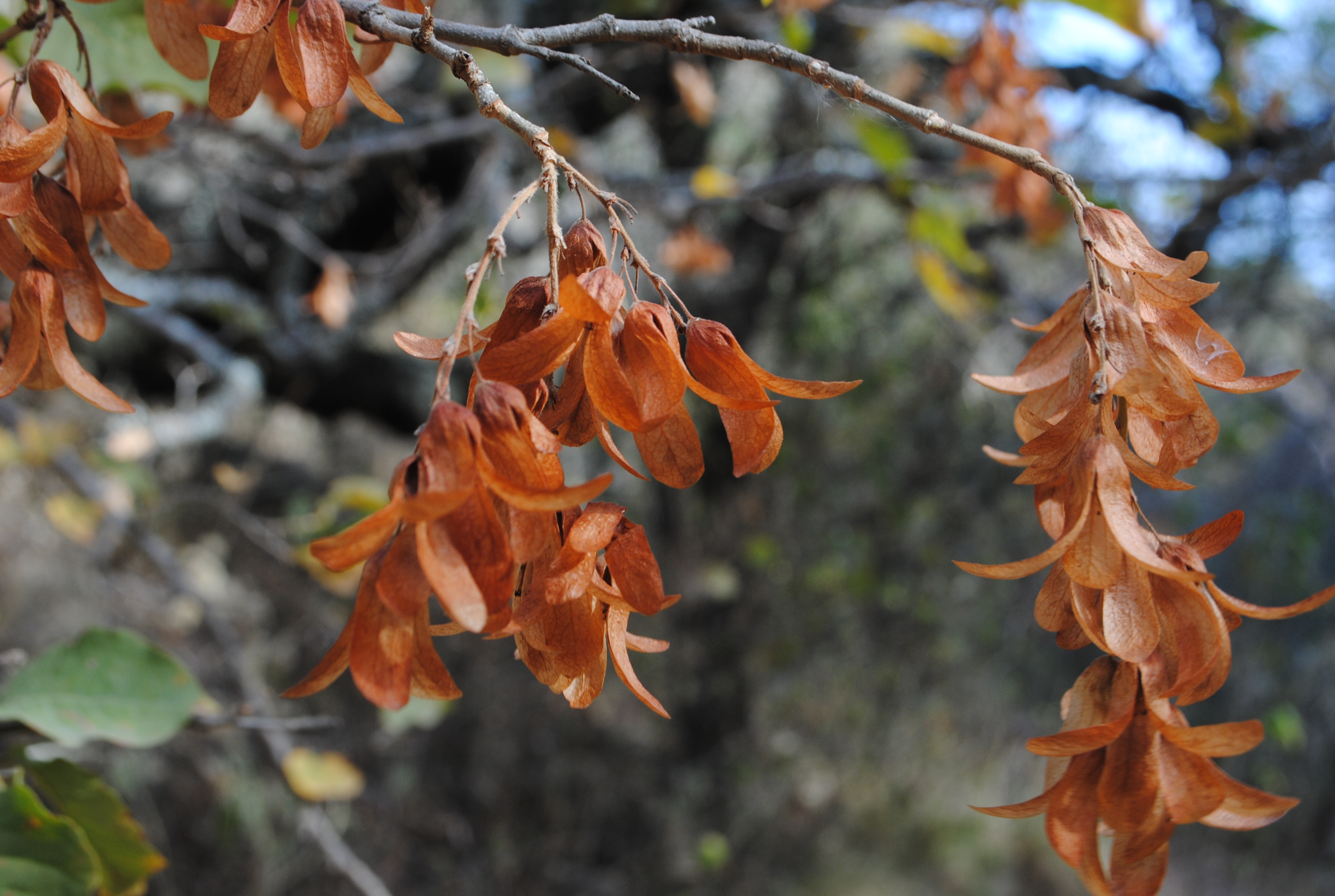

Conservation status
- Near Threatened (IUCN 2.3)

Scientific classification
- Kingdom: Plantae
- Clade: Tracheophytes
- Clade: Angiosperms
- Clade: Eudicots
- Order: Caryophyllales
- Family: Polygonaceae
- Genus: Ruprechtia
- Species: R. apetala

Binomial name
- Ruprechtia apetala Weddell

= Ruprechtia apetala =

Species of tree

Ruprechtia apetala is a species of deciduous tree in the family Polygonaceae. It is found in Argentina and Bolivia. It is threatened by habitat loss. In autumn, its leaves turn bright yellow and orange.
