= Casa de Moneda de la República Argentina =

Argentine government agency

Coordinates: 34°35′1.08017″S 58°22′18.35231″W

Argentine Mint
- Casa de Moneda Argentina
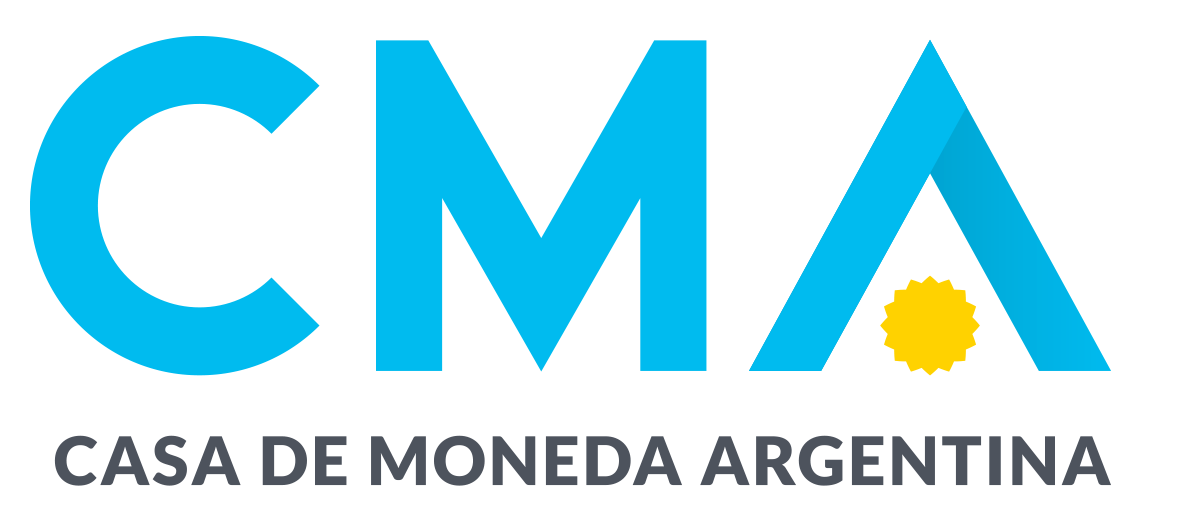

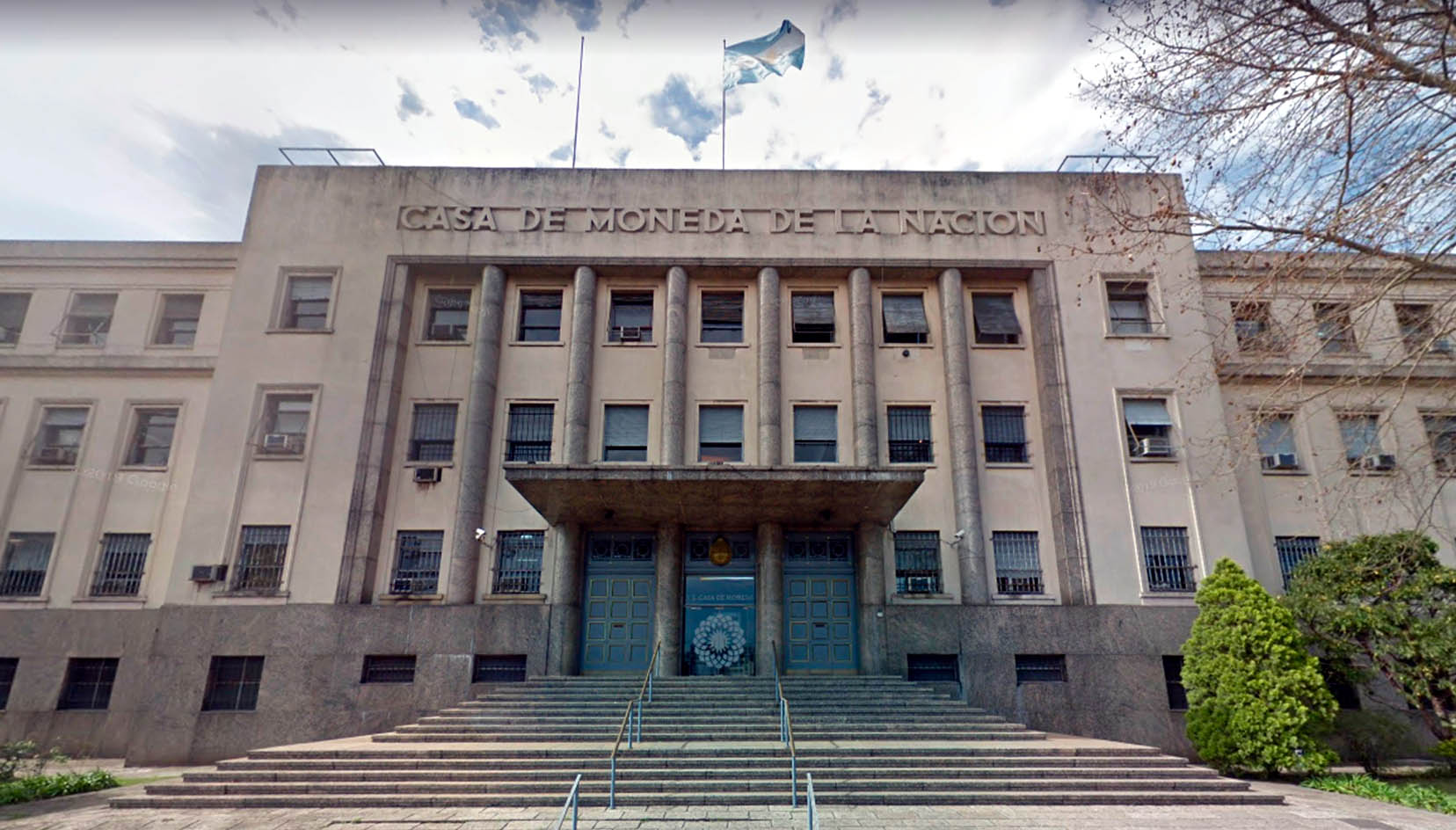
- Casa de Moneda building in Buenos Aires

Agency overview
- Formed: 1875; 151 years ago
- Type: Mint
- Jurisdiction: Argentina
- Headquarters: Av. Antártida Argentina 2085, Buenos Aires
- Minister responsible: Ministry of Economy
- Agency executives: Daniel Rubén Méndez, President; vice president, Marina Pecar
- Parent agency: Ministry of Economy
- Website: casademoneda.com.ar

The Casa de Moneda de la República Argentina is the Argentine mint, controlled by the Argentine government and administratively subordinated to the Ministry of Economy. It was established in 1875 as "Casa de Moneda de la Nación".

It produces legal tender coins and banknotes. It also produces medals and security prints (i.e., passports, subway tokens, postage stamps) that are used and issued by government-run service providers. The present currency printed is the Argentine peso, since 1992.

== History ==
The Casa de Moneda was established in 1875 as "Casa de Moneda de la Nación", through Law 733 which created the peso fuerte as currency, and established the creation of two mints, one in Buenos Aires and another in Salta; The first factory to produce coins would not be opened until 14 February 1881, when the first building located on México and Defensa streets started producing coins in the country. Engineer Eduardo Castilla was the Casa de Moneda first director, while John Joseph Jolly Kyle was chief chemist.

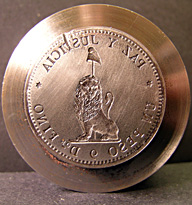
Paraguayan peso coin produced by Casa de Moneda in 1900, the first assignment from a foreign country

The Casa incorporated the minting of medals into its productive activity in 1881. A workshop was conditioned and special tools were purchased for that purpose. The printing of stamps and tax stamps, as well as State stationery were added to Casa de Moneda's portfolio in 1886. The first work assigned for other countries came out in 1889, when the mint produced a total of 600,000 coins of 1 Paraguayan peso.

In 1897 it was established that Casa de Moneda Argentina would be the public entity in charge of printing banknotes, according to the provisions of Laws No. 3,062 and 3,505 and the Decree of October 16, the House printed the banknotes necessary to partially and renew all the currency that was in circulation. To do that, Castilla travelled to Paris and hired the renowned engraver Eugenio Mouchón to make the matrix plates of seven banknote values, and the contracting of paper, machines and accessories intended for this purpose. The first special press for typographic printing of banknotes was received one year later. It was manufactured by Messrs. E. Lambert & Cía. from France. This one, when tested, did not turn out to be strong enough to reproduce large vignettes, for which another one with greater power had to be requested. The first line of banknotes, named "Peso Moneda Nacional" was printed in 1899.

The Mint prints postage stamps were printed for the first time in 1908. Its printing was in charge of the mint until 1998. Although work was being carried out for the post office and telegraphs, it was in 1908 when the director Juan F. Sarhy convinced the post office authorities of the economic and security benefits that printing postage stamps at Casa de Moneda implied. A total of 148,951,000 stamps were printed that year. The Casa de Moneda produced Uruguayan peso coins for a total of 464.147 units in 1916.

On September 1, 1927, the Casa de Moneda Museum was inaugurated, with historical banknotes, coins, postal and other stamps, seals, medals, and others.

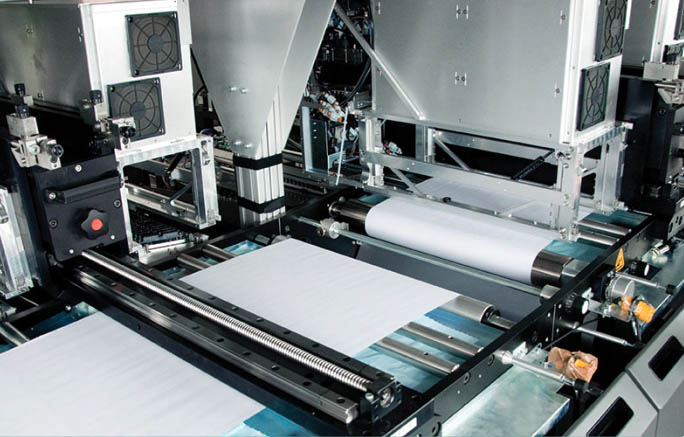
Printing machines

On August 19 1977, by Law 21,622, Casa de Moneda was transformed into a state company ("Sociedad del Estado", abbrevriated S.E.). This change legally authorized the mint to develop activities of an industrial and commercial nature; its constitution and operation were ruled by S.A. procedures. As a S.E. the Casa de Moneda had possibility of competing in the internal and external market; manage and dispose of the funds and resources of the company; establish their own rules and regulations for internal operations, among others.

== Seats ==
The first headquarters of the mint was built on a land at the intersection of Defensa and México streets. It was designed by the engineer Eduardo Castilla, at the time the institution's first director, in an Italianate style.

The land had been previously occupied by "Hospital del Rey", founded by Juan de Garay and built between 1611 and 1613. Apart from that, other buildings there were the "Cuartel de la Partida Celadosa", then the Police Lions Corps, the Infantry Barracks of the Restorer of the Laws (nickname given to Juan Manuel de Rosas), and finally a depot property of the Municipality.

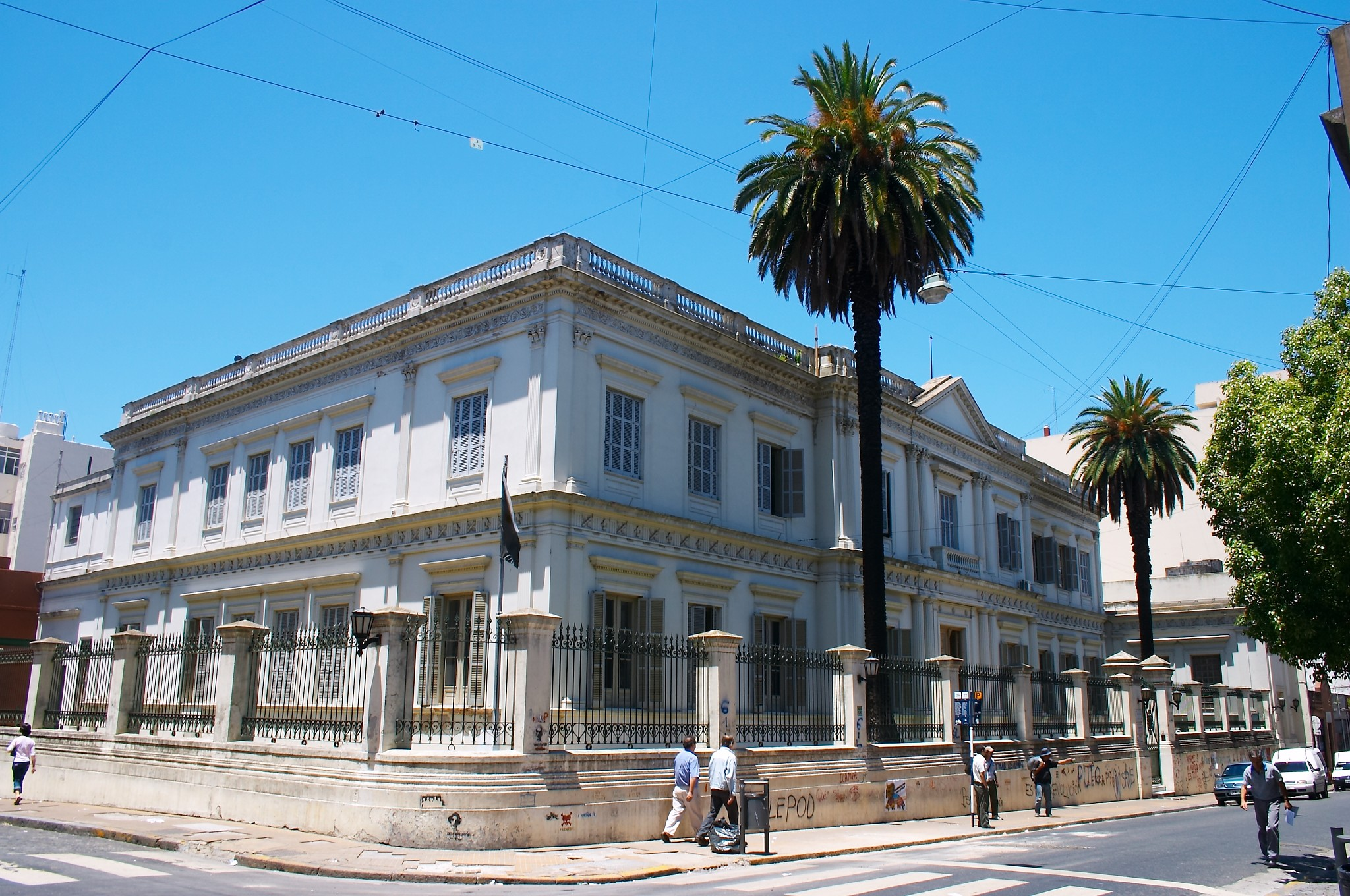
Former Casa de Moneda building (1881–1914) on Defensa street. Nowadays the National Mint Museum

This first Casa de la Moneda had a symmetrical plan with a central patio, ground floor and first floor and a structure made of iron and bricks. On the façade, the entrance portal and its tympanum stood out, interrupting the balustrade at the top with a frieze with metopes and triglyphs adorned with bees and lily flowers.

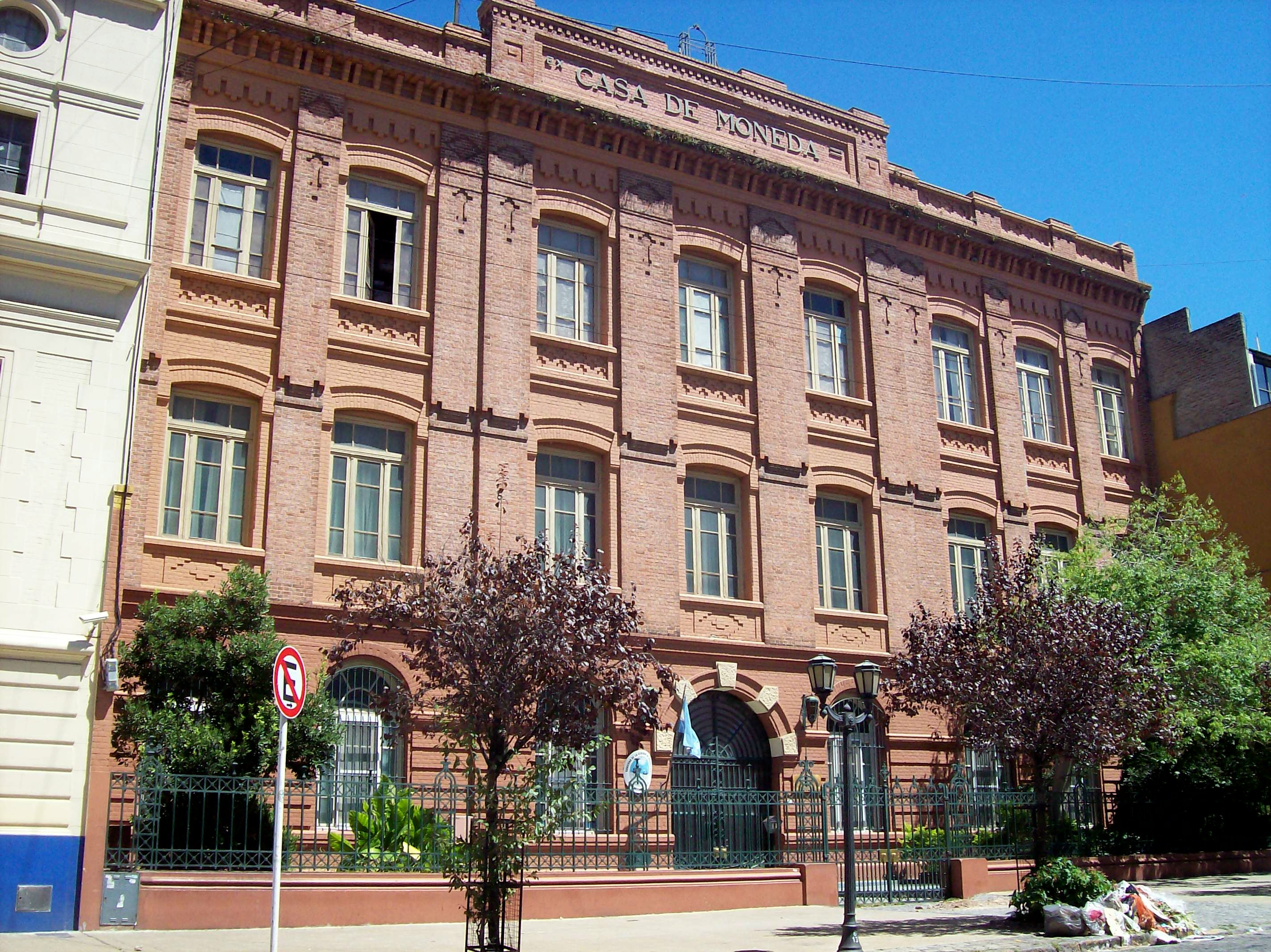
Annex of Casa de Moneda, the second seat of the mint (1914–1944)

Already in the 1910s this building was insufficient for the functions of a mint therefore an annex (named "Annex of Casa de Moneda") was inaugurated in 1914 on an adjacent plot of land, with an exit on Balcarce street. The building featured a brick front of English stylistic influence.

Dr. Antonio A. García Morales, who directed the institution between 1935 and 1946, carried out the decision to build a new headquarters for the institution. Thus, in 1937 a piece of land was ceded in the filled area of the Río de la Plata coast where the Puerto Nuevo had been built, and in 1939 the construction was authorized by decree 29,158.

The new mint was inaugurated on December 27, 1944, and it is the one that fulfills that function today. It is located at Avenida Antártida Argentina and made in rationalist style (although it has monumentalist neoclassical references, such as the columns of the portico) and has a covered area of 40,913.11 m², with four floors. It is the work of the architects Quincke, Nin Mitchell and Chute —whose project was chosen by competition in 1939— and was in charge of the construction company Curuchet, Olivera and Giraldez.

The building is actually made up of two connected bodies, which share the composition of the basement, ground floor and three floors. Towards Avenida Antártida Argentina is the main access, hierarchical by a staircase, which leads to the main hall of the administrative headquarters. From the same hall starts the corridor that connects with the industrial sector, which has an E-shaped plan, joined to a smaller L-shaped one.
