= Shoe tree (device) =

Device that helps preserve a shoe's shape

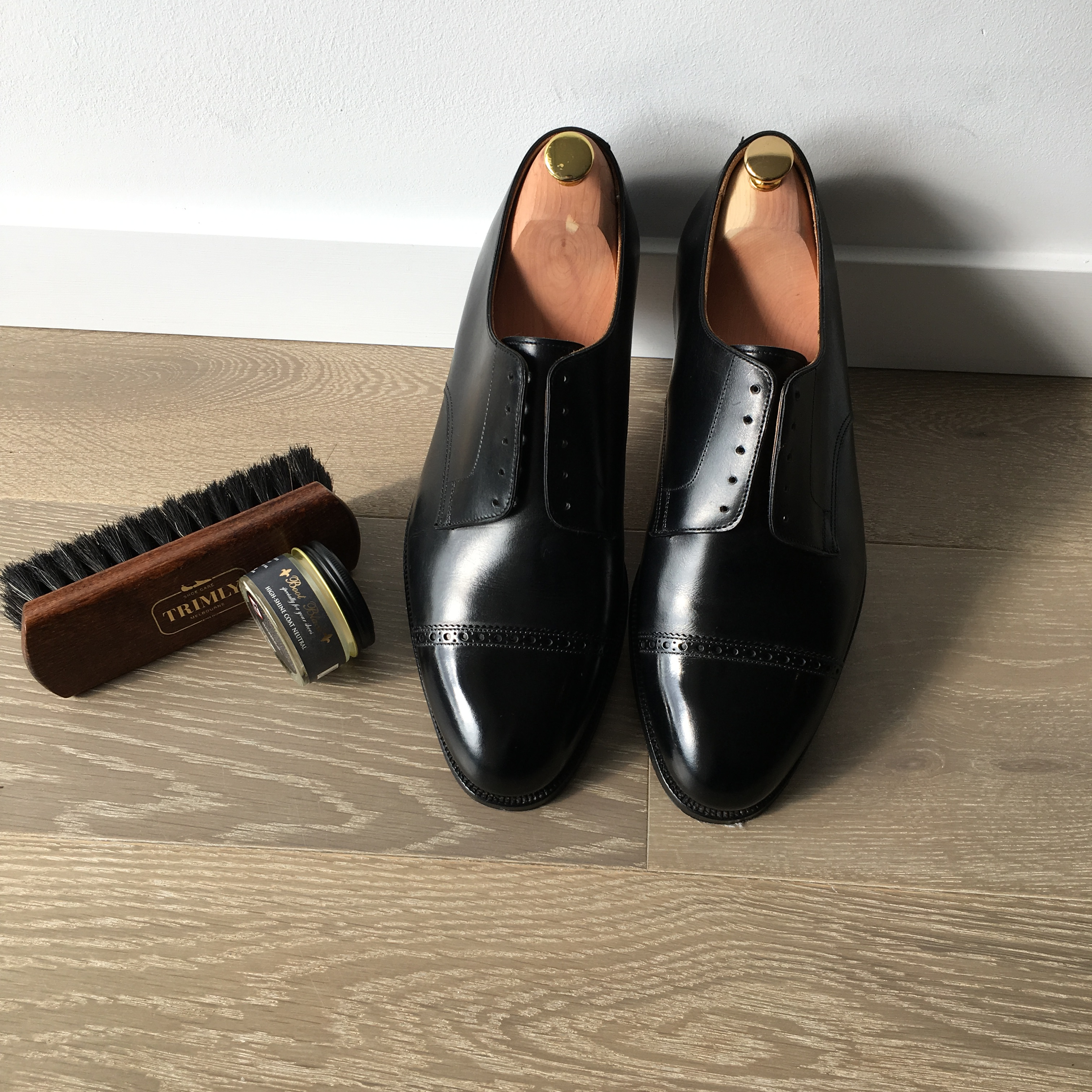
Shoe trees in use

A shoe tree is a device approximating the shape of a foot that is placed inside a shoe to preserve its shape, stop it from developing creases, and thereby extend the life of the shoe.

Perhaps more important than maintaining the shape, shoe trees also play a crucial part in wicking away moisture caused by sweat - a major cause of lining rot and leather degradation. This is especially important when shoes are worn without socks.

Higher quality shoe trees are made from softwood, usually cedar, which helps control odor and absorb moisture.

== Types ==
Among wooden shoe trees, there are generally three categories, which correspond to price and quality.

=== Spring shoe trees ===
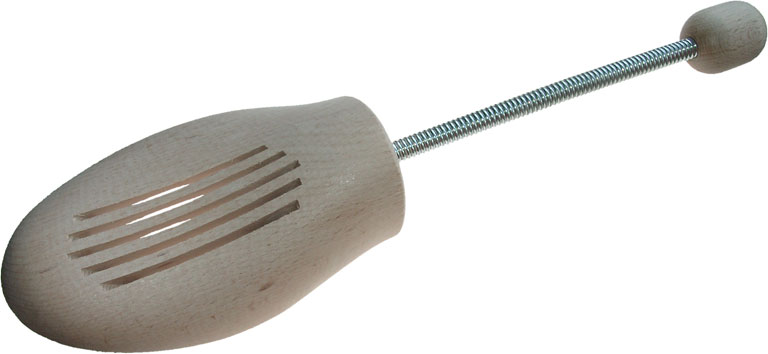
Spring shoe trees

The cheapest are a wooden shoe tree without a full heel. Although they help with odour, and will help preserve the original shape at the front of the shoe, the narrow knob on the heel puts excess pressure on one section of the heel and prolonged use may deform the shoe. Notwithstanding, this style of shoe tree is popular with high heels because of its flexibility.

=== Generic shoe trees ===
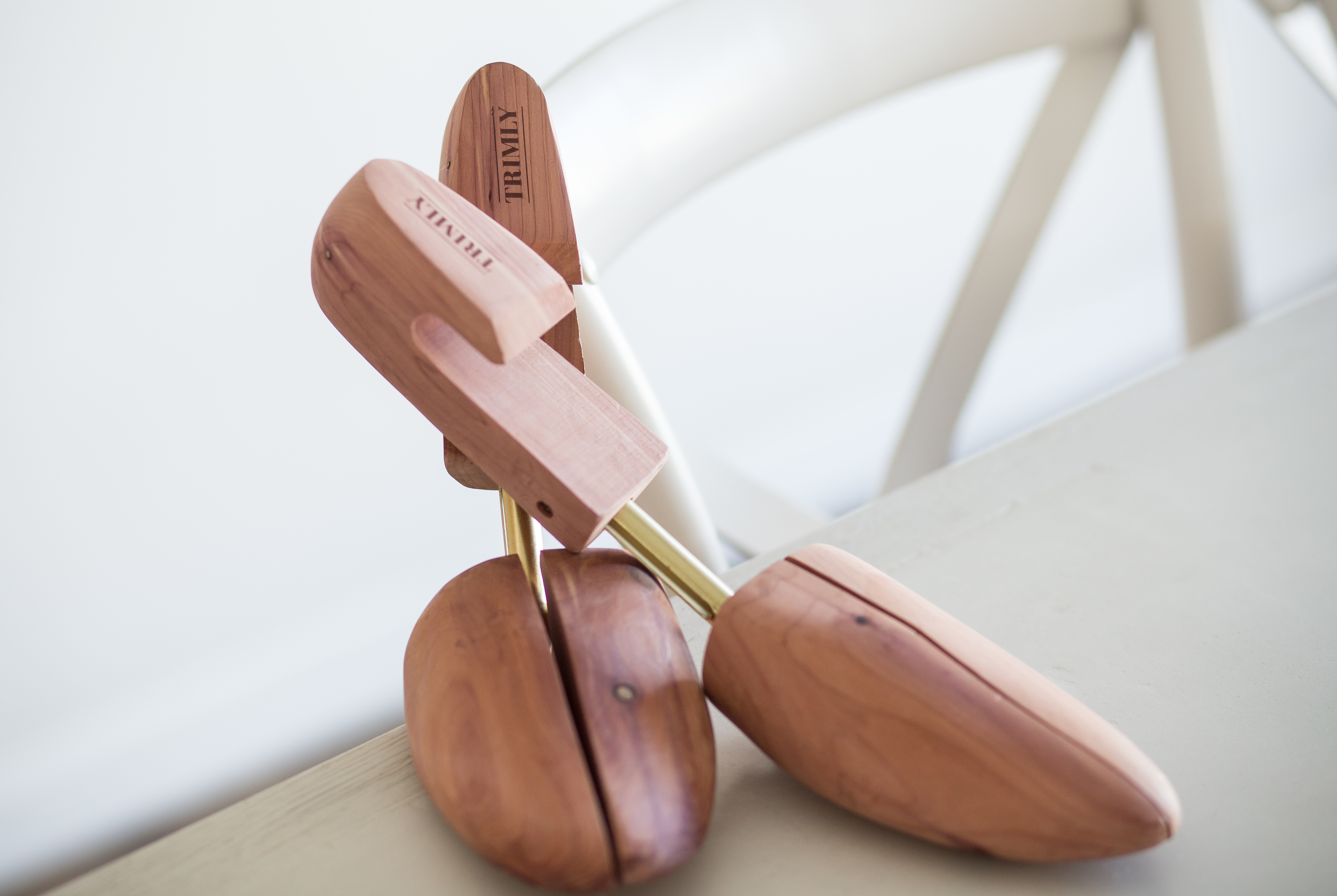
Popular in the U.S., the split-toe shoe tree

Generic shoe trees are non-lasted shoe trees that are designed to fit a wide range of footwear styles. Generic shoe trees come in many styles; two of the more popular ones are the twin-tube and single-tube shoe trees. The twin-tube shoe tree, cut from a generic last and featuring a fully articulated (round heel), a spring toe, and ventilation holes. This style is most popular in England and Europe. The single-tube, split-toe shoe tree with an overhand handle, works on a spring-spreader mechanism, causing the split toe to expand into the shoe when inserted into the shoe. This style is most popular in the United States.

=== Lasted shoe trees ===
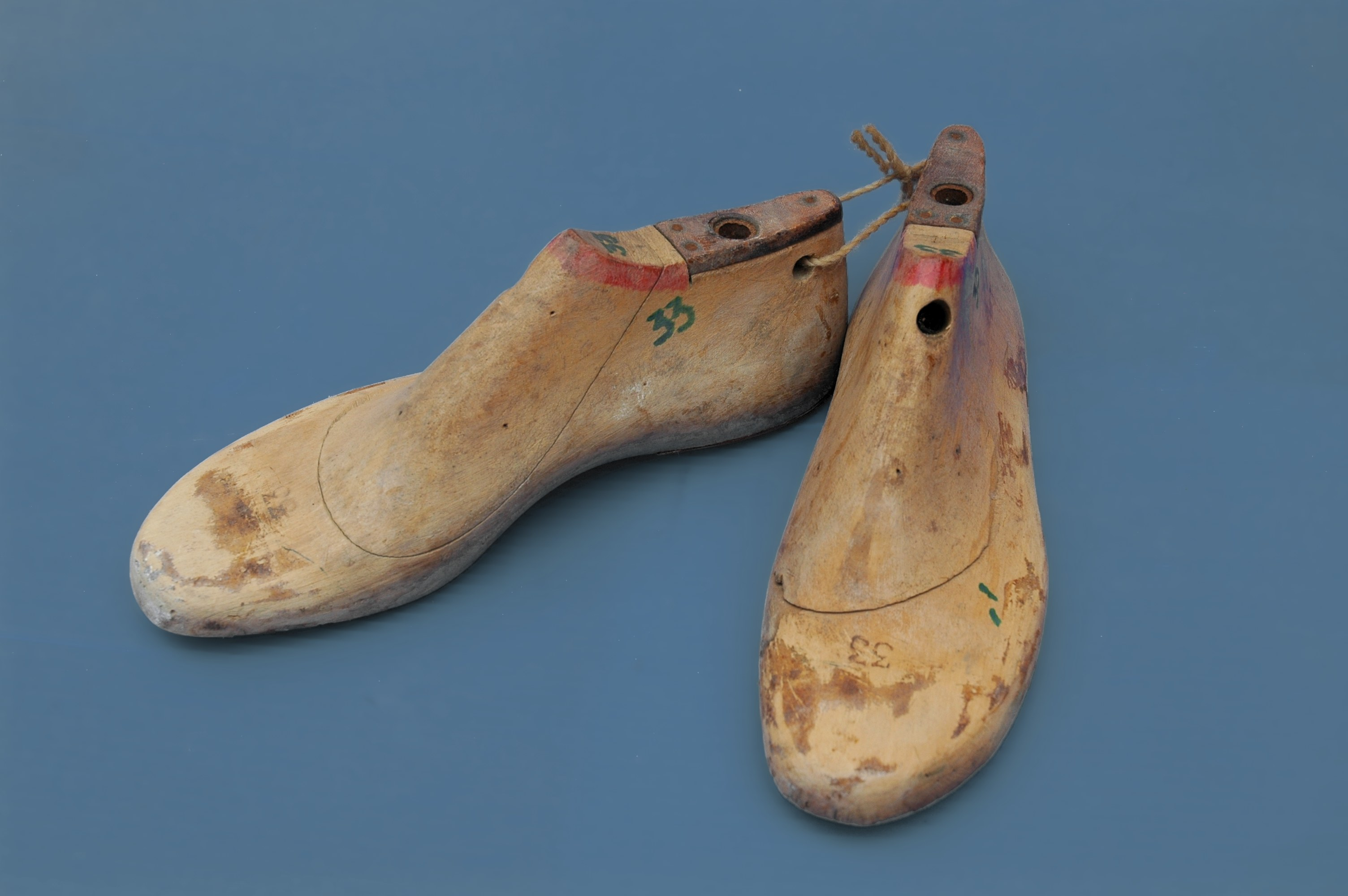
Lasted shoe trees

At the highest range are lasted shoe trees, which accompany the shoes for which they have the same last.

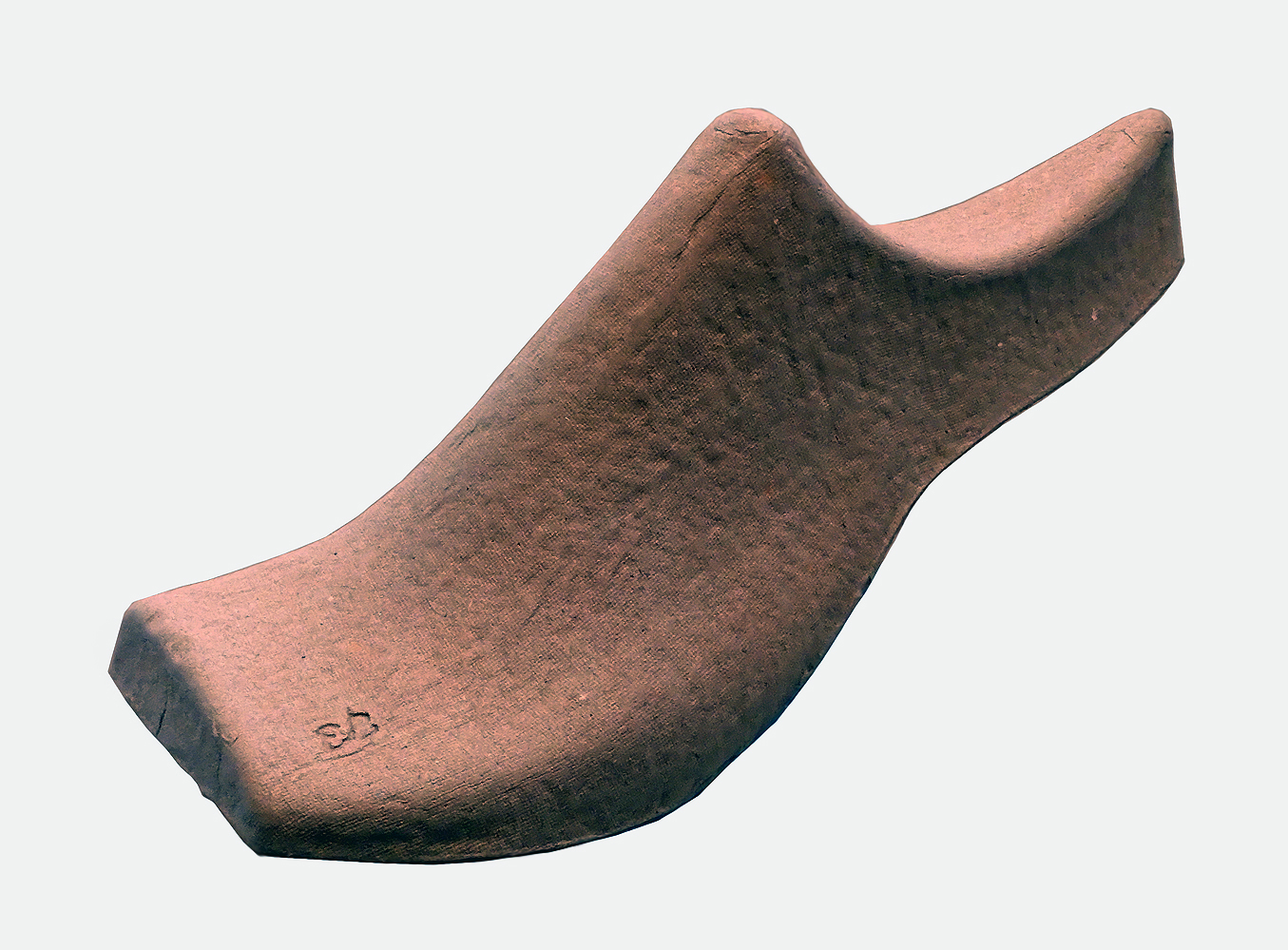
A Shoe tree in recycled paper.

=== Plastic shoe trees ===
Shoe trees may also be made of plastic or stamped sheet metal, with or without a coiled steel spring stem; these are typically cheaper, lighter, and are better suited for traveling. Types lacking a flexing steel spring may use extension springs or adjustable two-piece stems having an over-center mechanical action to wedge them in place. Plastic shoe trees maintain the shape of your shoes but lack the moisture-absorbing qualities of wooden shoe trees. Because wooden shoe trees can damage the leather when stored in luggage, plastic shoe trees are often used when traveling, as well as having the added benefit of being lightweight.

== When to use ==
By absorbing moisture from leather more quickly than evaporation would alone, a shoe tree aims to limit the growth of bacterial colonies that would otherwise thrive by decomposing the sweat-saturated leather. So it is best to insert a shoe tree immediately after the shoe is removed before such colonies develop or while they are as small as possible.

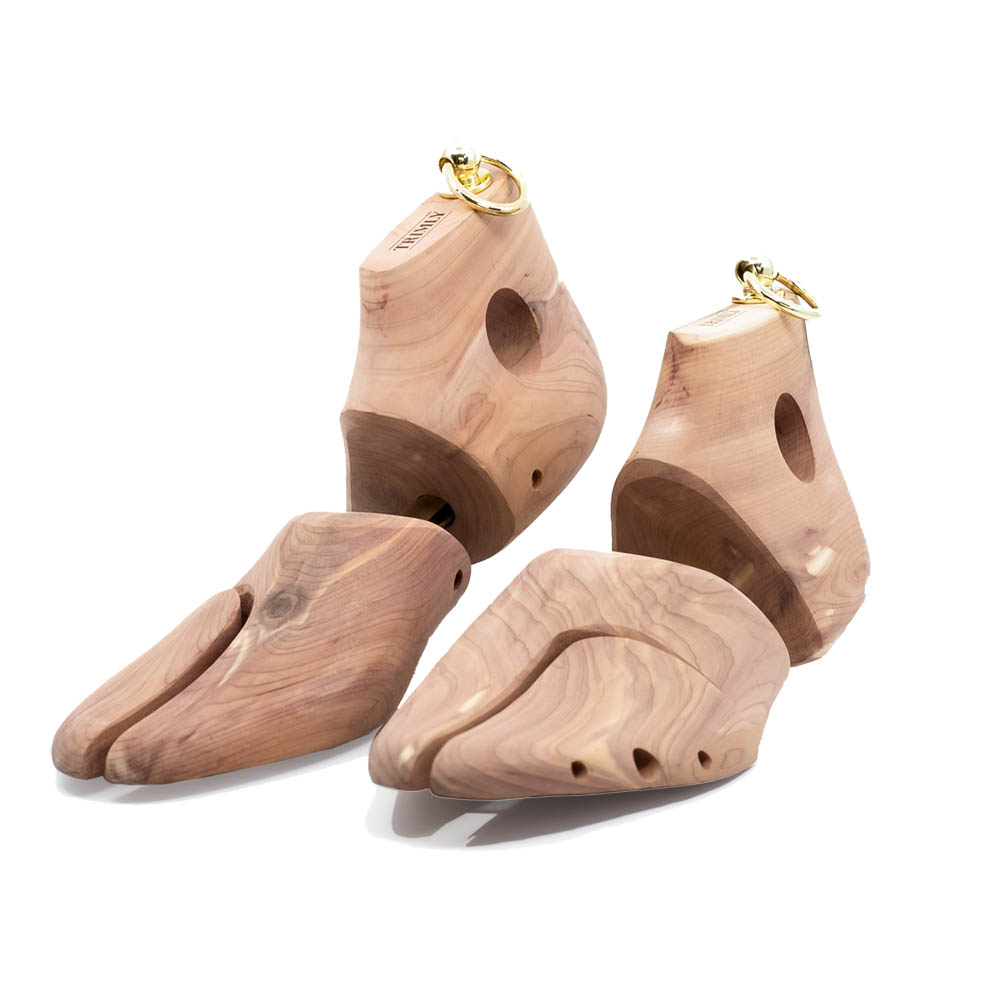
Cedar boot trees

== Boot trees ==
Boot trees for riding boots

Boot trees are shoe trees for boots. Boot trees are often used on ankle-high boots and are similar to standard shoe trees but have a higher ankle area. Their main function is to support the heel counter, which helps preserve the integrity of the higher heel and prevents it from creasing or folding over. The fore part of the boot tree acts as a standard shoe tree and works to gently stretch out the vamp and prevent creasing.

Creases that form in the calves of boots can affect comfort when walking. For zip boots, creasing may eventually cause the zip to break. By investing in a pair of boot trees a repair like this can easily be avoided.

A boot shaper, on the other hand, has wooden or plastic formers with centre support or wedge that expands to provide the ideal tension for your boots. Some boot shapers come with a trigger that allows easy fitting and hanging.
