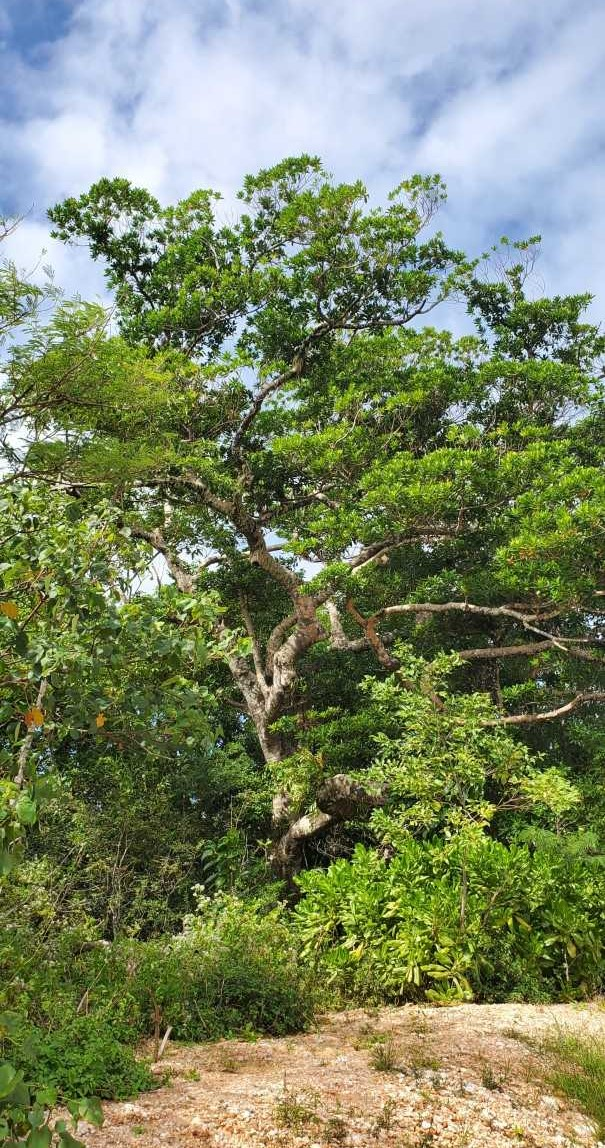
- Mature tree in Dededo, Guam

Scientific classification
- Kingdom: Plantae
- Clade: Tracheophytes
- Clade: Angiosperms
- Clade: Eudicots
- Clade: Rosids
- Order: Oxalidales
- Family: Elaeocarpaceae
- Genus: Elaeocarpus
- Species: E. joga

Binomial name
- Elaeocarpus joga Merr.

Synonyms
- Elaeocarpus carolinensis Koidz. pro parte

= Elaeocarpus joga =

Species of plant

Elaeocarpus joga is a species of tree in the family Elaeocarpaceae. It is native to the Mariana Islands and Palau. It is a moderately-sized tree with blue-coloured, round, 1.5cm diameter fruit and leaves which turn bright red before they reach senescence.

In the Chamorro language it is called yoga.

== Description ==
Merrill (see taxonomy) considered it to be a distinct species by virtue of its relatively small leaves with numerous domatia upon them, and its relatively large flowers.

== Taxonomy ==
Elaeocarpus joga was first formally described by Elmer Drew Merrill in 1914, but earlier described in the 1905 The Useful Plants of Guam by W. E. Safford. The holotype was collected by R. C. McGregor in Guam in 1911.

In the 1971 article The Flora of Guam, B. C. Stone recorded it as E. sphaericus (sensu Schum., now E. angustifolius), but in a 1979 article in the same journal updating the flora of the region, A geographical checklist of the Micronesian Dicotyledonae, Fosberg et al. did not accept this and continued to recognise E. joga.

Coode wrote in 2010 that E. joga, and its partial synonym E. carolinensis, need to be re-examined (it falls outside the region studied in his paper) to see if it truly is an independent species and not a synonym, and to which section of the genus Elaeocarpus it belongs. If it belongs to section Ganitrus like E. angustifolius, this is a biogeographic oddity, because all other species appear to have evolved in the Malay Archipelago. Merrill places it in the section Dicera. Confusingly, Fosberg et al. also state that E. grandis, which may in turn be a synonym of E. angustifolius, has been introduced to Palau.

A 2013 thesis using molecular phylogenetics to study the Elaeocarpus in Australasia tested an old sample of E. carolinensis from the Caroline Islands and found it generally nested within E. angustifolius in most sequences studied, but somewhat divergent in trnL-F. It clearly belongs to section Ganitrus, which was found nicely genetically monophyletic, despite the section's circumscription being based on Cooke's morphological studies alone.

== Distribution ==
According to Fosberg et al. the species is native to the Marianas Islands (Guam, Rota, Saipan, Pagan, Alamagan) and the nation of Palau (Babeldaob).

== Uses ==
In the late 19th century, some logging of this species took place on Guam. It yielded logs of up to 14m, although Safford was unaware of trees that size in 1905.

== See also ==
List of endemic plants in the Mariana Islands

== Gallery ==
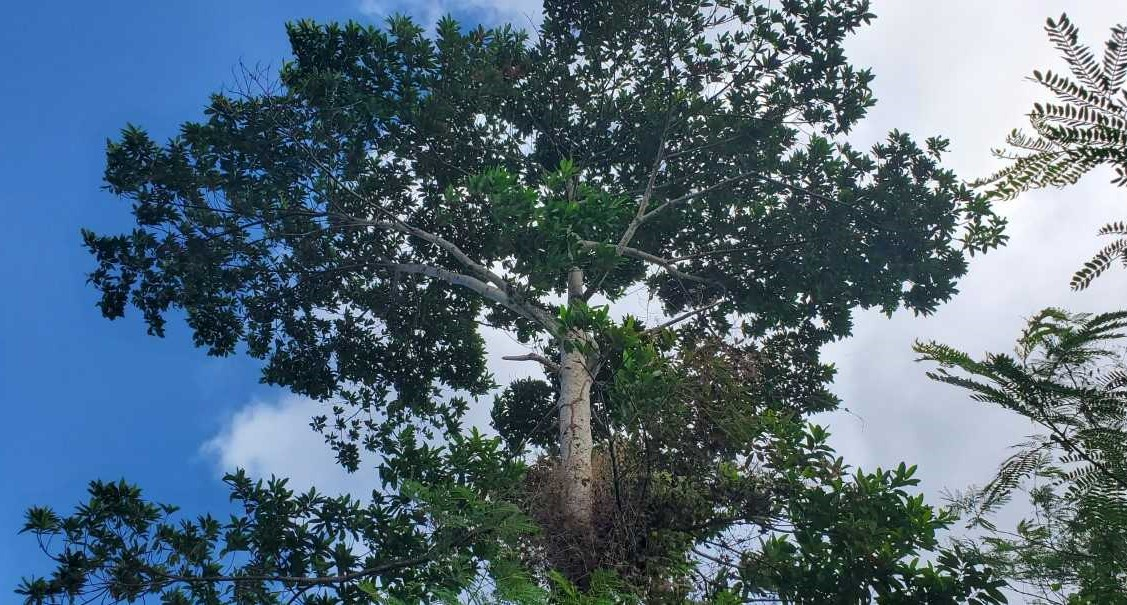
Mature tree canopy

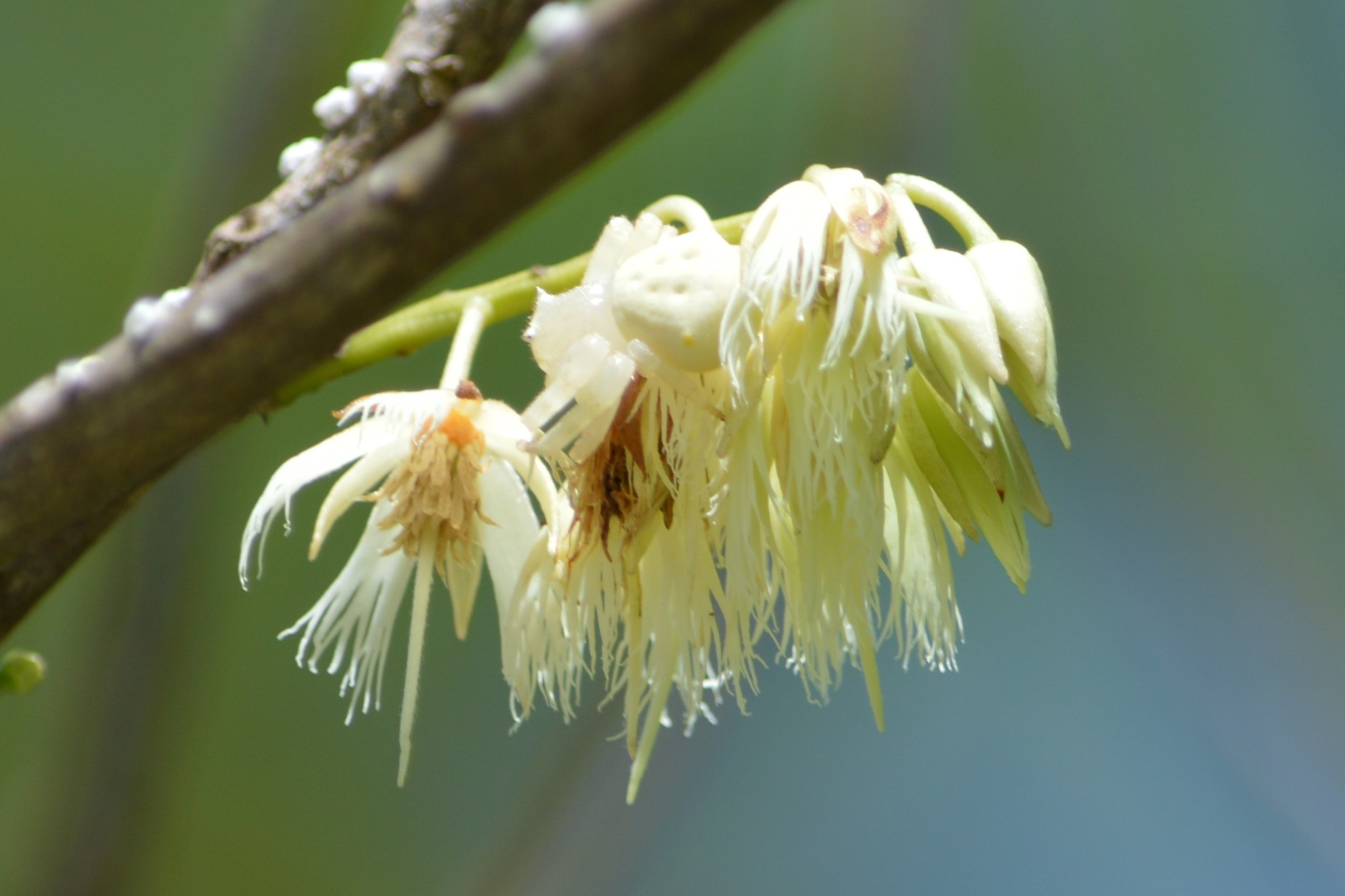
Flowers

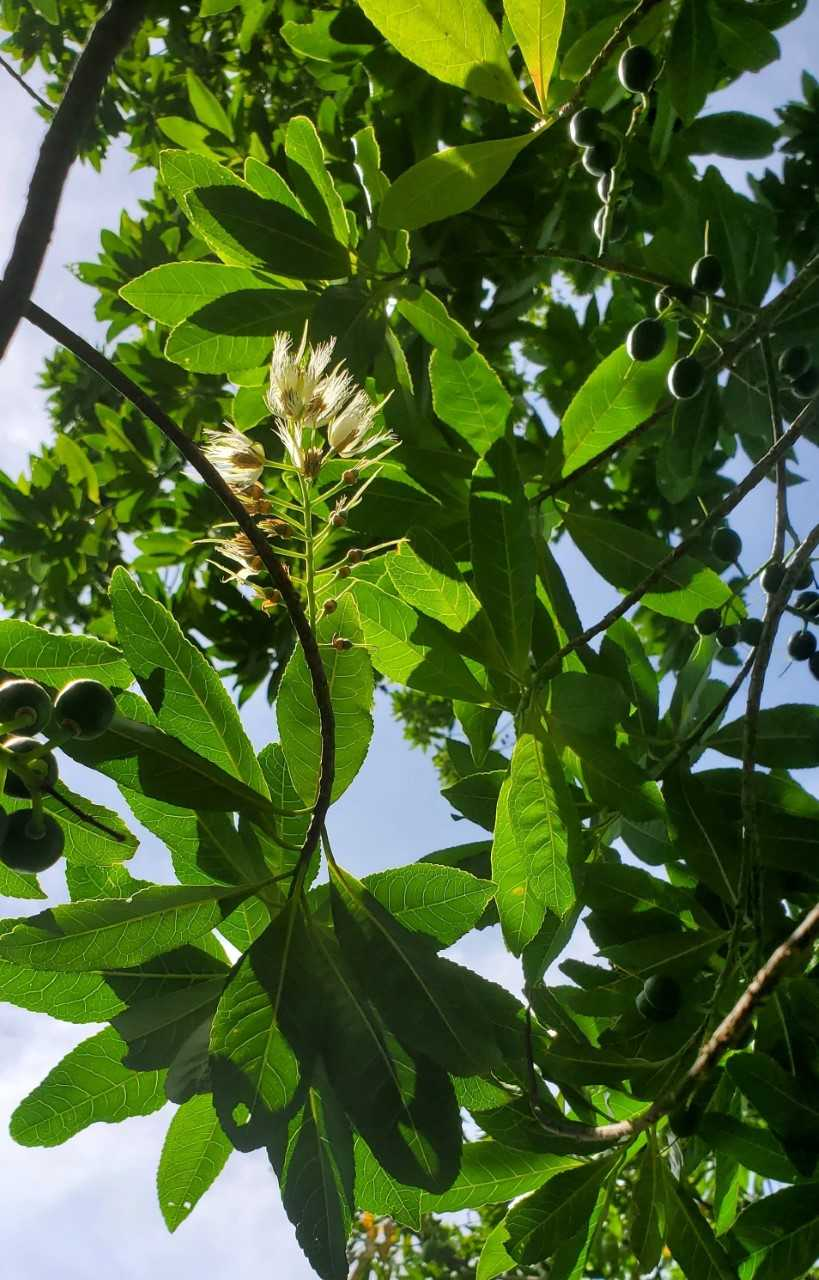
Flower raceme and immature fruits. Dededo, Guam

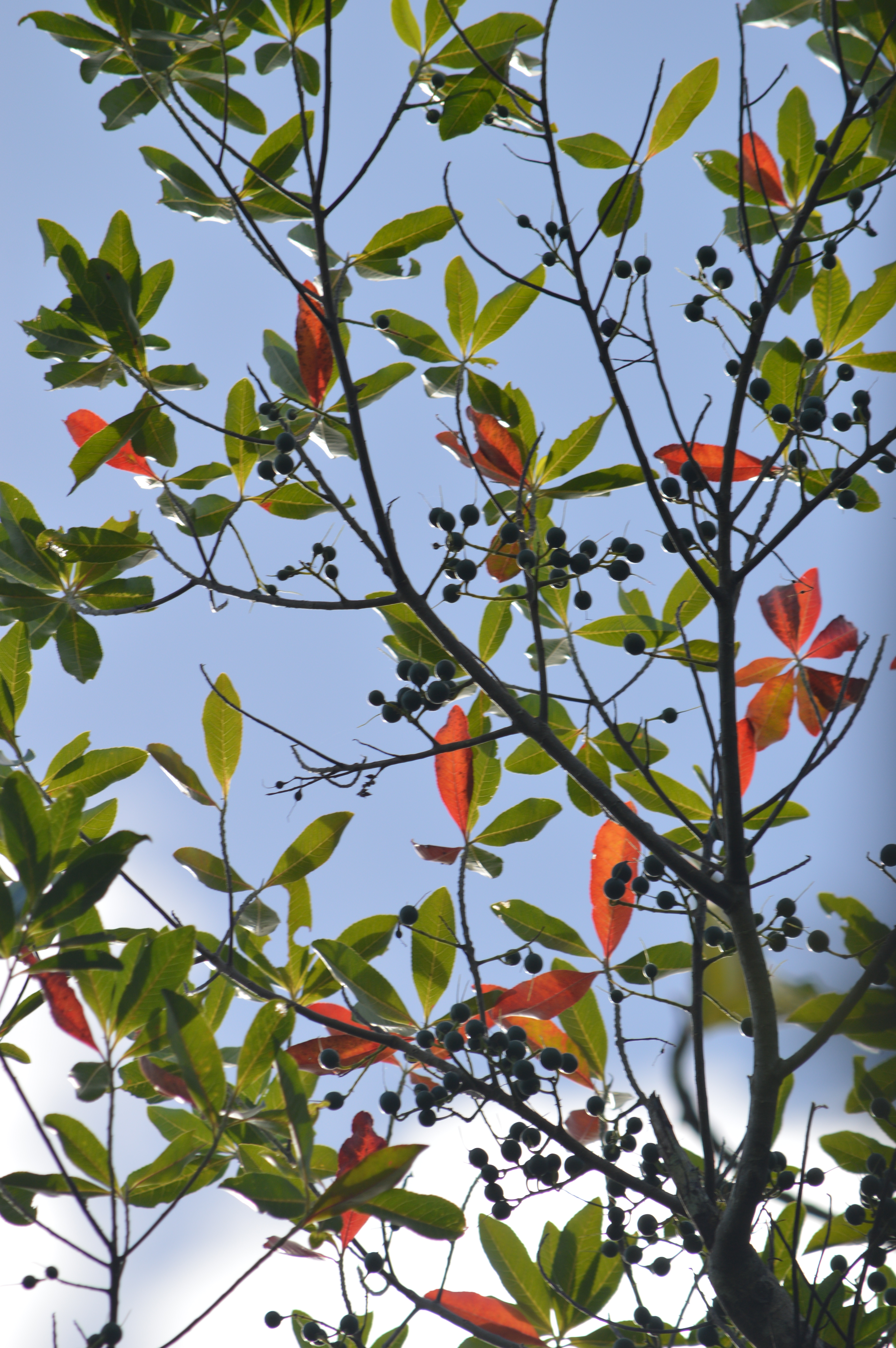
Leaves and fruit

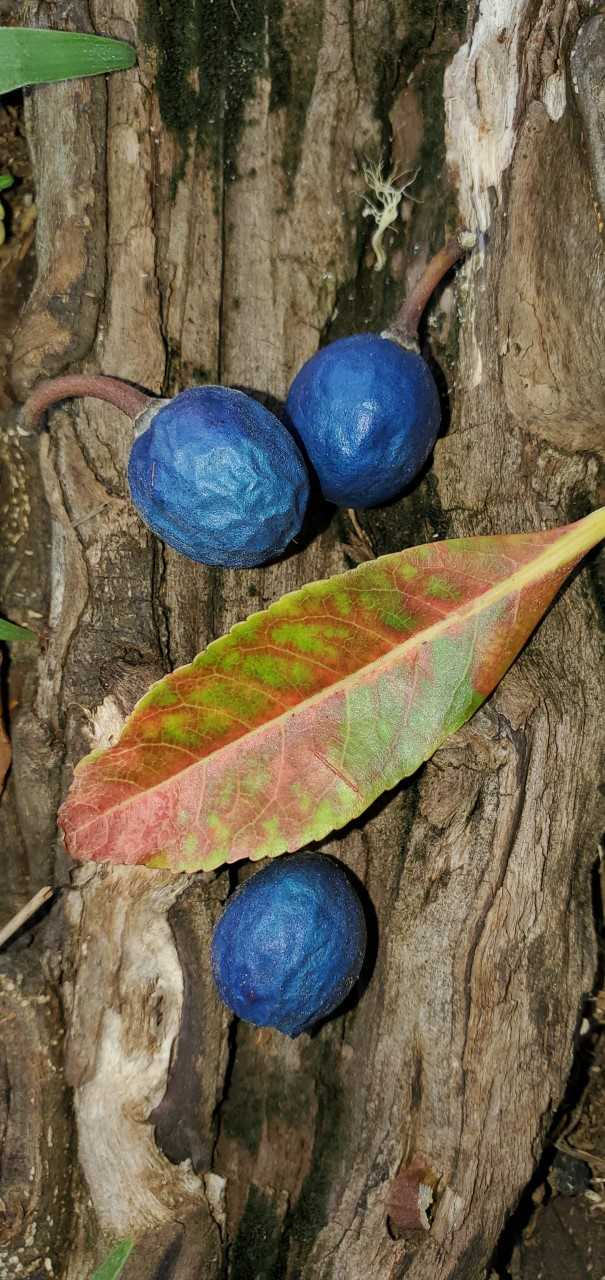
Leaf and ripe fruits. Dededo, Guam

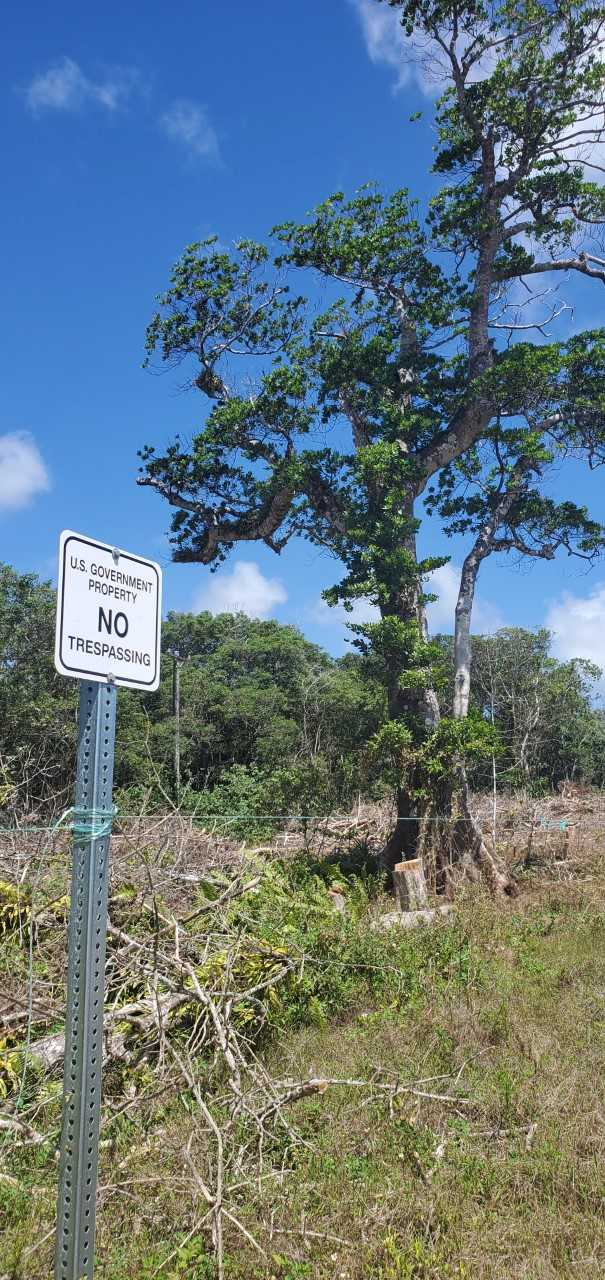
Mature tree saved from clearing on military land. Dededo, Guam
