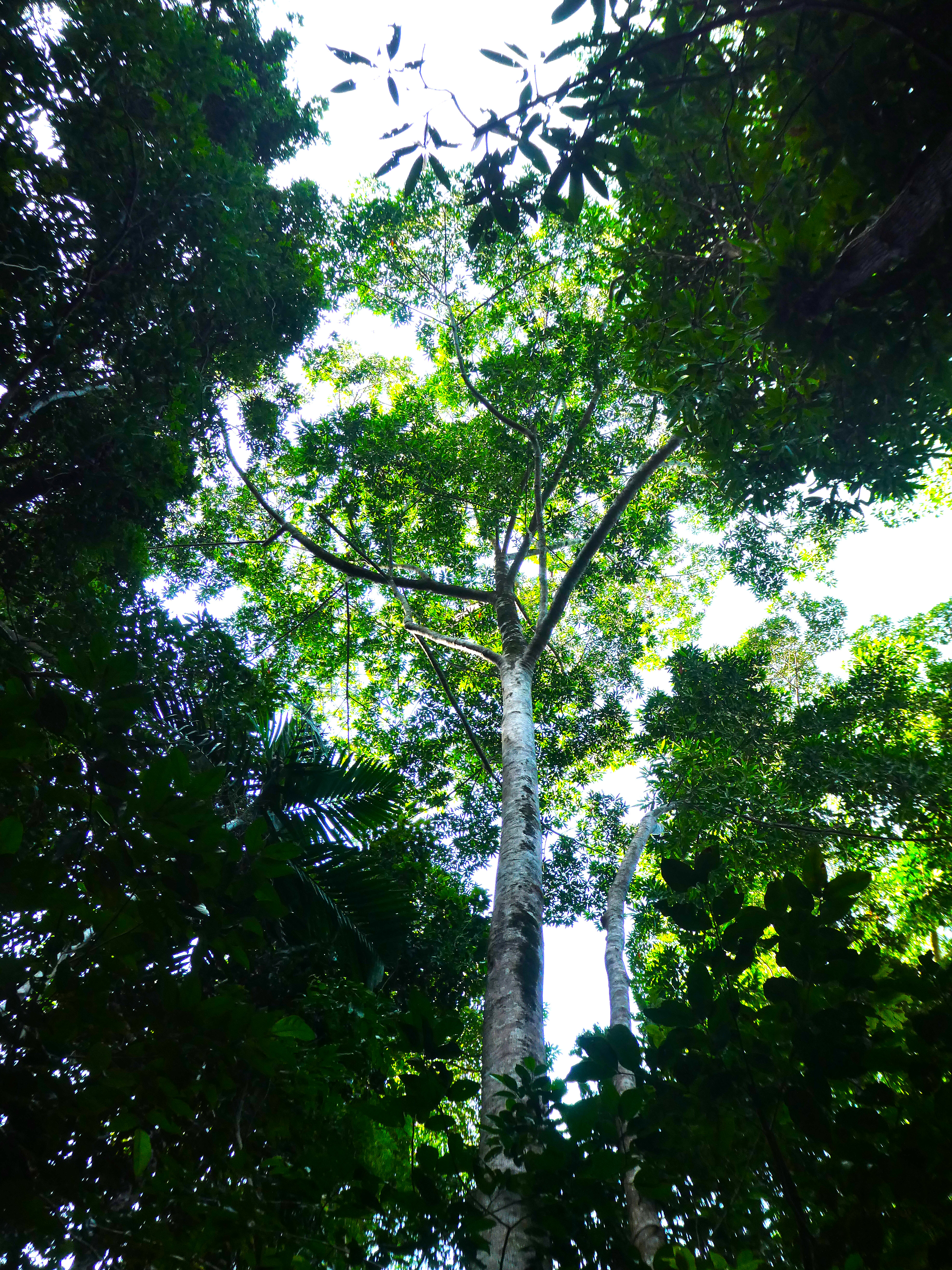
- Emergent tree in rainforest in Cairns, Queensland

Conservation status
- Least Concern (NCA)

Scientific classification
- Kingdom: Plantae
- Clade: Tracheophytes
- Clade: Angiosperms
- Clade: Eudicots
- Clade: Rosids
- Order: Oxalidales
- Family: Elaeocarpaceae
- Genus: Elaeocarpus
- Species: E. grandis

Binomial name
- Elaeocarpus grandis F.Muell.

Synonyms
- Elaeocarpus drymophilus Domin

= Elaeocarpus grandis =

Blue quandong

Species of plant native to Australia

Elaeocarpus grandis, commonly known as blue quandong, is a species of flowering plant in the family Elaeocarpaceae first described in 1860. It is a large buttressed tree native to the coastal rainforests of northeastern Australia. The validity of this taxon is disputed, with some authorities accepting it and others presenting it as Elaeocarpus angustifolius.

== Description ==
Elaeocarpus grandis is a large tree that may grow to a height of 35 m (115 ft). The trunk is usually straight and cylindrical with pale grey bark marked by vertical lines. Buttress roots are present even on smaller trees, becoming large and elaborate on older trees. The crown is sparse and open, the branches layered, with the leaves clustered towards the ends of the twigs.

The leaves are bright green above and paler below, turning bright red before falling; it is common to see red leaves in the canopy at any time of year. The leaves are simple, i.e. without divisions or lobes, and arranged alternately on the twigs. They are oblong to elliptic and measure up to 18 cm (7.1 in) long and 4 cm (1.6 in) wide, and are regularly and shallowly toothed. They are held on a petiole up to 2 cm (0.8 in) long and have many small domatia on the underside.

The blue quandong begins to flower around the seventh year, and the inflorescences are racemes up to 10 cm (3.9 in) long, produced in the leaf axils and on the branches below the leaves. They each bear 12–16 fragrant, pale green to white flowers on pedicels about 15 mm (0.6 in) long. The flowers measure about 10 mm (0.4 in) wide and 15 mm (0.6 in) long, with five petals that have thin lobes at their apices, giving them a fringed appearance. They have between fifty and seventy stamens.

The fruit is an almost spherical blue drupe, measuring about 2–3 cm (0.8–1.2 in) in diameter. Beneath the skin there is a thin layer of green flesh around the deeply sculptured stone. The stone contains between two and five seeds.

=== Phenology ===
Flowering and fruiting appears to occur throughout the year. The Australian botanist Wendy Elizabeth Cooper has stated that flowering of E. grandis occurs from October to March and fruit appear in any month. The citizen-science website iNaturalist compiles phenology data from the observations that are uploaded to it, which shows that flowering has been observed in this species in all months except August, September and October, while fruit were observed in every month but with a significant surge of sightings from June to November.

== Taxonomy ==
Elaeocarpus grandis was first described in 1860 by German-born Australian botanist Ferdinand von Mueller in his work Fragmenta phytographiæ Australiæ. It was based on plant material collected by himself and a Mr. Hill on the banks of the Pine River. In 1984 the British botanist Mark James Elgar Coode published a 98-page paper covering the genus Elaeocarpus in Australia and New Zealand, in which he reduced E. grandis to synonymy under E. angustifolius. However, in 2010 it was again accepted as a valid species by the Australian Plant Census.

=== Taxonomic status ===
This species is an unresolved taxon, meaning that various authorities disagree on its validity. It is recognised by the national taxonomic authority in Australia, the Australian Plant Census; by Plants of the World Online and by World Flora Online. It is also recognised by the authorities of both Australian states in which it is purported to exist, i.e. Queensland and New South Wales. On the other hand, the Global Biodiversity Information Facility and Catalogue of Life treat it as a variety of E. angustifolius.

=== Etymology ===
The genus name Elaeocarpus is derived from the Greek words ελιά (eliá) meaning "olive", and καρπός (karpós) meaning "fruit", which is a reference to the superficial similarity of the fruits of the two taxa. The species epithet grandis is the Latin word for "large", referring to the great height that this tree will grow to.

=== Common names ===
"Blue quandong" is the officially endorsed common name. Other less common names include Brisbane quandong, blue fig, blueberry ash, brush quandong, caloon, coolan, cooloon, genitri, indian oil fruit, silver quandong and white quandong.

== Distribution and habitat ==
The blue quandong grows in well developed tropical and subtropical rainforest, often along watercourses. Its range is the coastal forests from the islands of the Torres Strait, through to the Nambucca River in northeastern New South Wales. In north Queensland the altitudinal range is from sea level to 1,100 m (3,600 ft).

== Ecology ==
The fruit of E. grandis are eaten by a variety of birds and animals, including the southern cassowary; the wompoo, rose-crowned and superb fruit doves; the pied imperial, topknot and white-headed pigeons; the eastern tube-nosed bat and the spectacled flying fox; the musky rat-kangaroo and native rats; and Lumholtz's tree-kangaroo.

The larvae of the moths Echiomima mythica and Eschatura lemurias bore into the timber of fallen trees, and were subsequently eaten by people of the Kuku Yalanji nation.

== Cultivation ==
The blue quandong is ideal for large gardens and parks, but its sheer size make it unsuitable for suburban home gardens or planting near drains. About 50 of these trees have been planted throughout the city of Cairns.

== Uses ==
=== Timber ===
The species is well regarded for its timber and as a key part in regenerating rainforest. In the colonial period, the timber was used for furniture, construction and for racing sculls and oars.

=== Use as food ===
Indigenous Australians ate the fruit raw or buried the unripe fruit in sand for four days making it sweet and more palatable. Early settlers used the fruit for jams, pies and pickles.

=== Decoration ===
Aboriginal people used the stones to make necklaces.

== Gallery ==
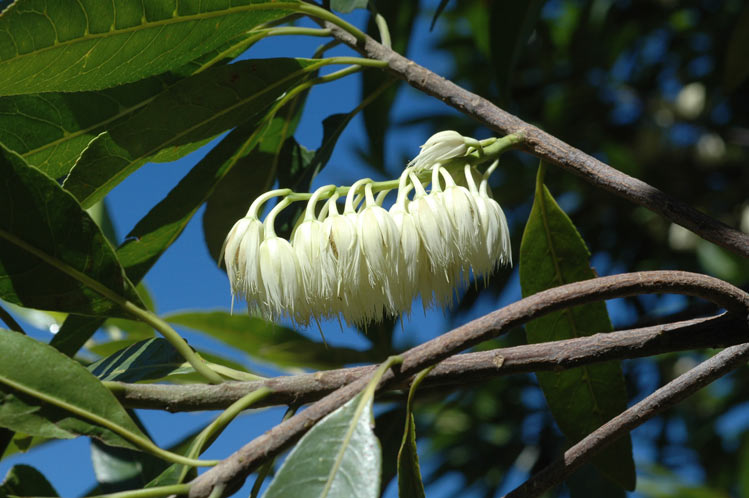
Inflorecence

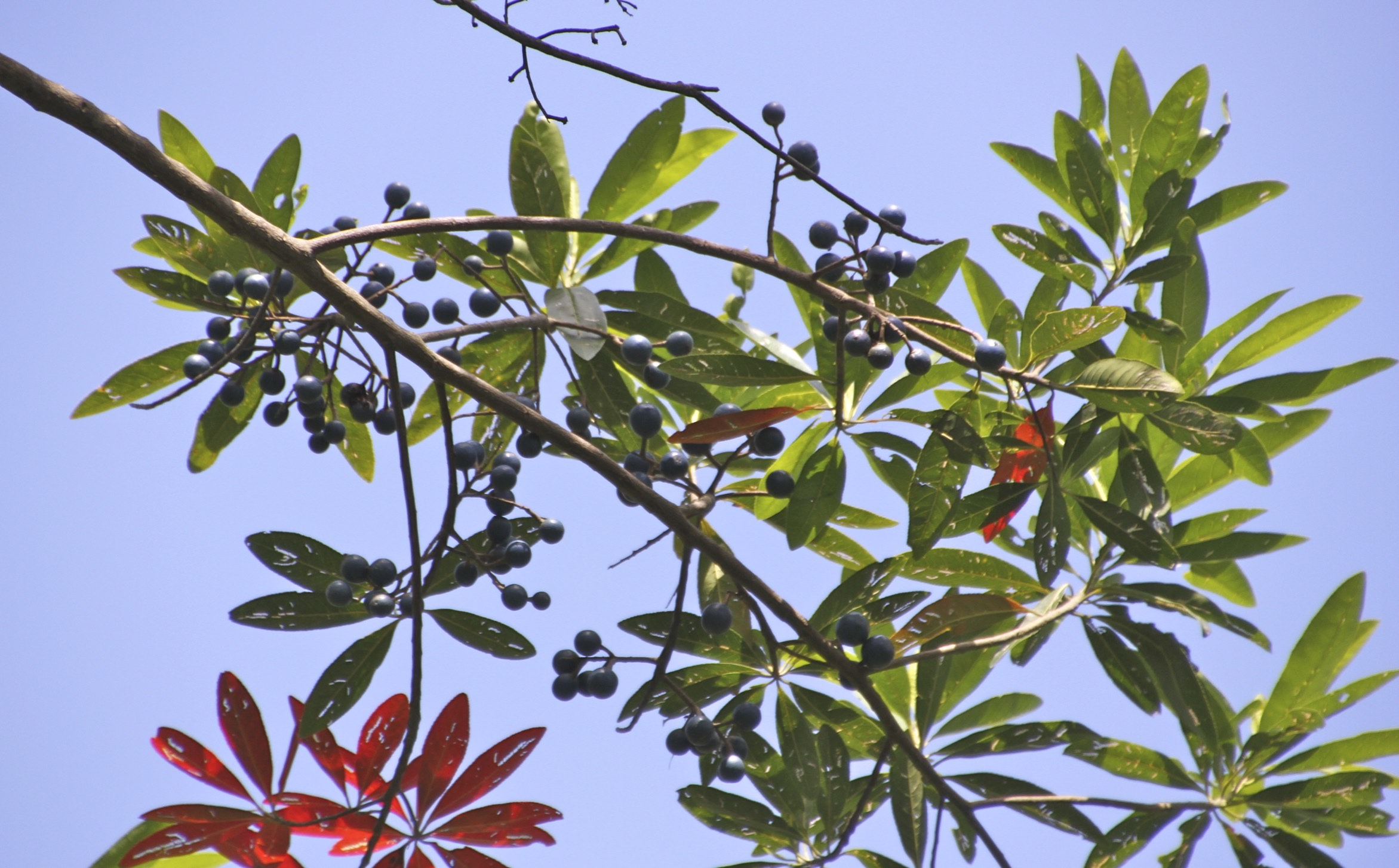
Foliage and fruit

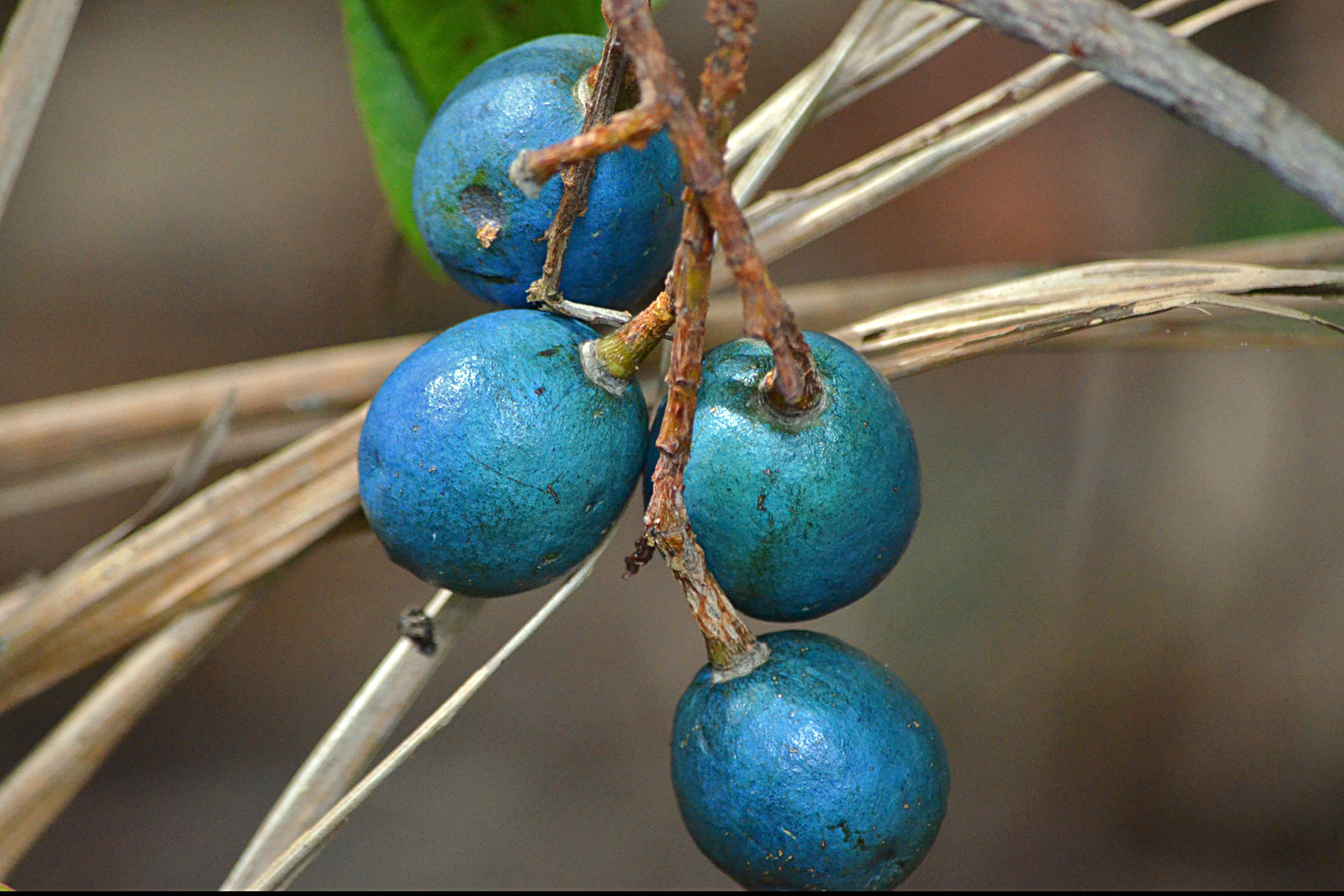
Fruit

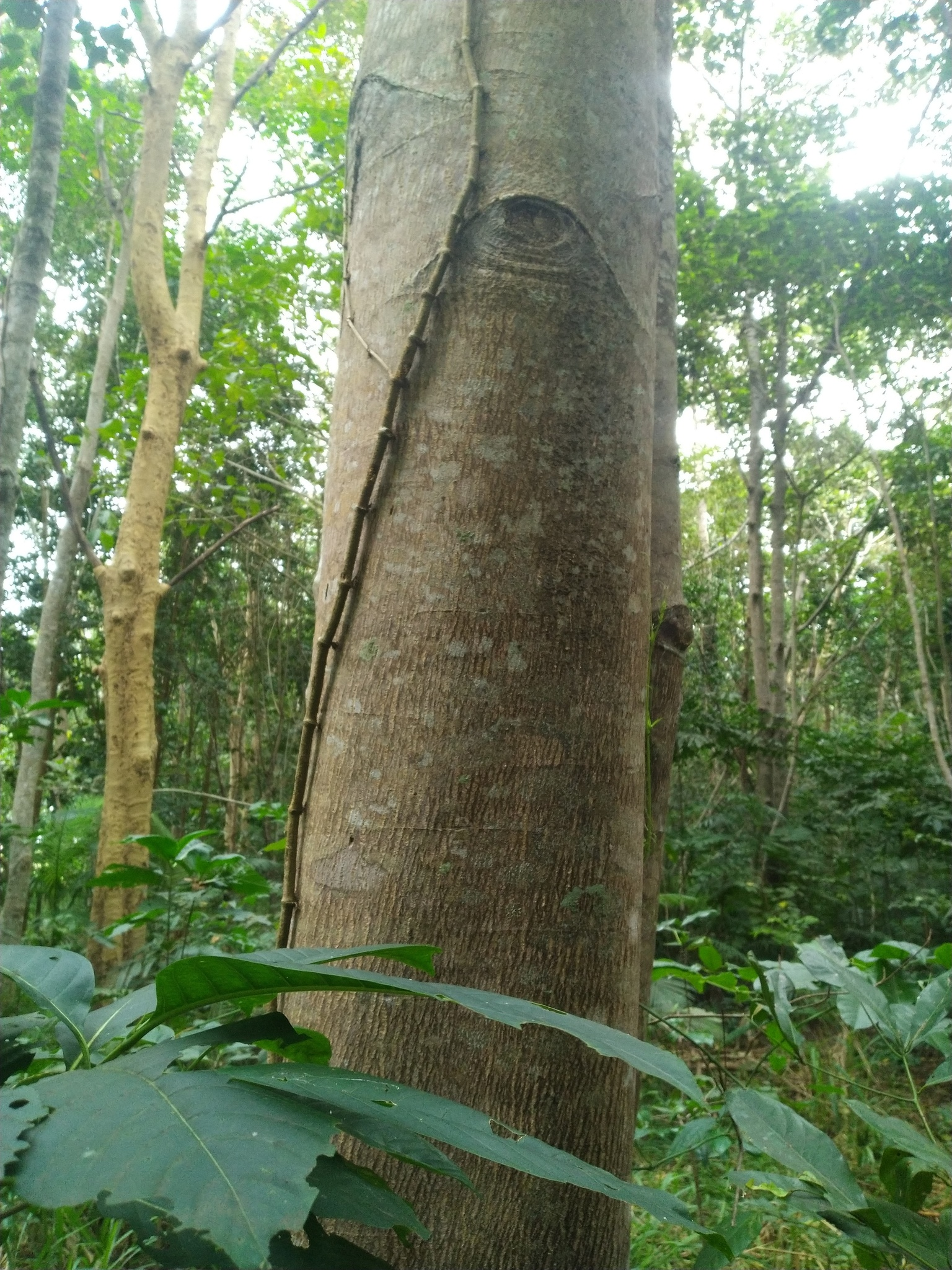
Trunk
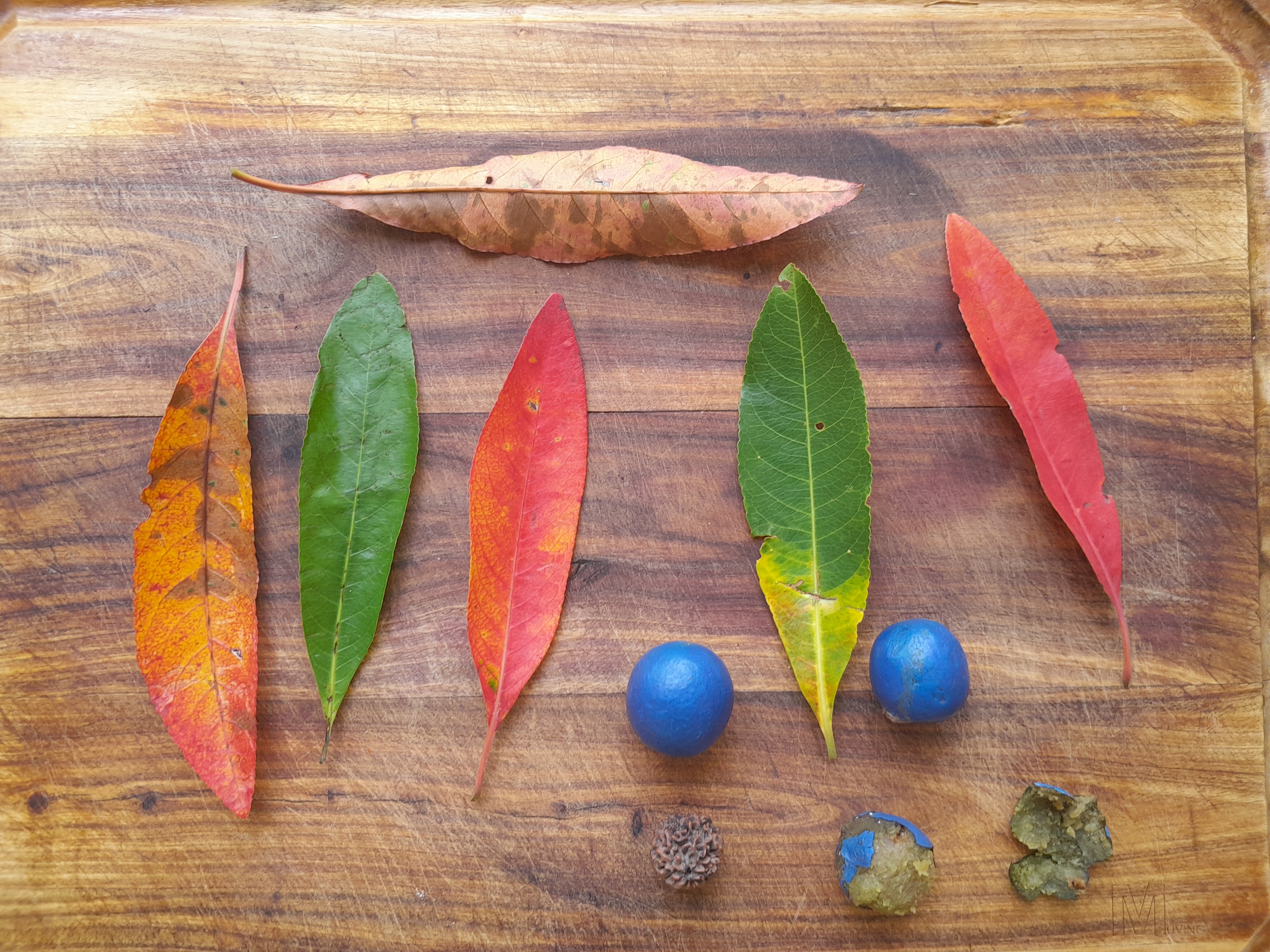
Leaves, fruit and seed

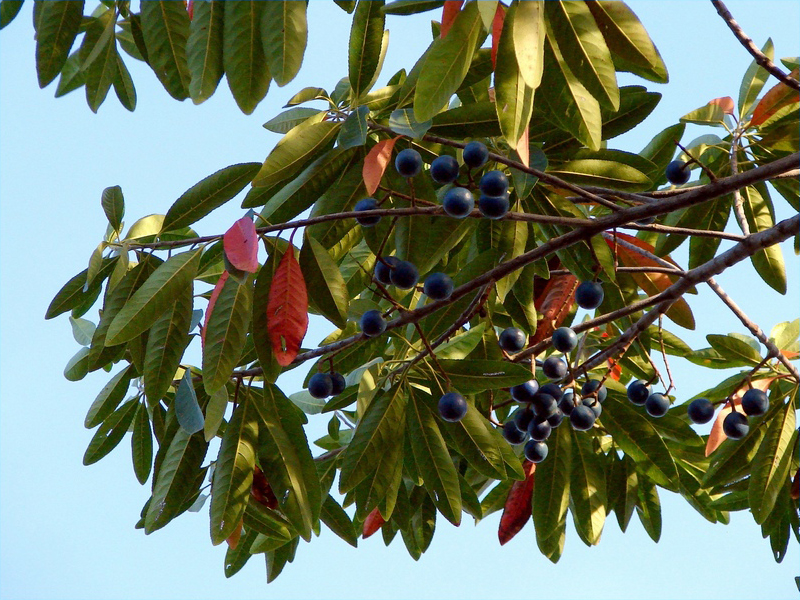
Branch

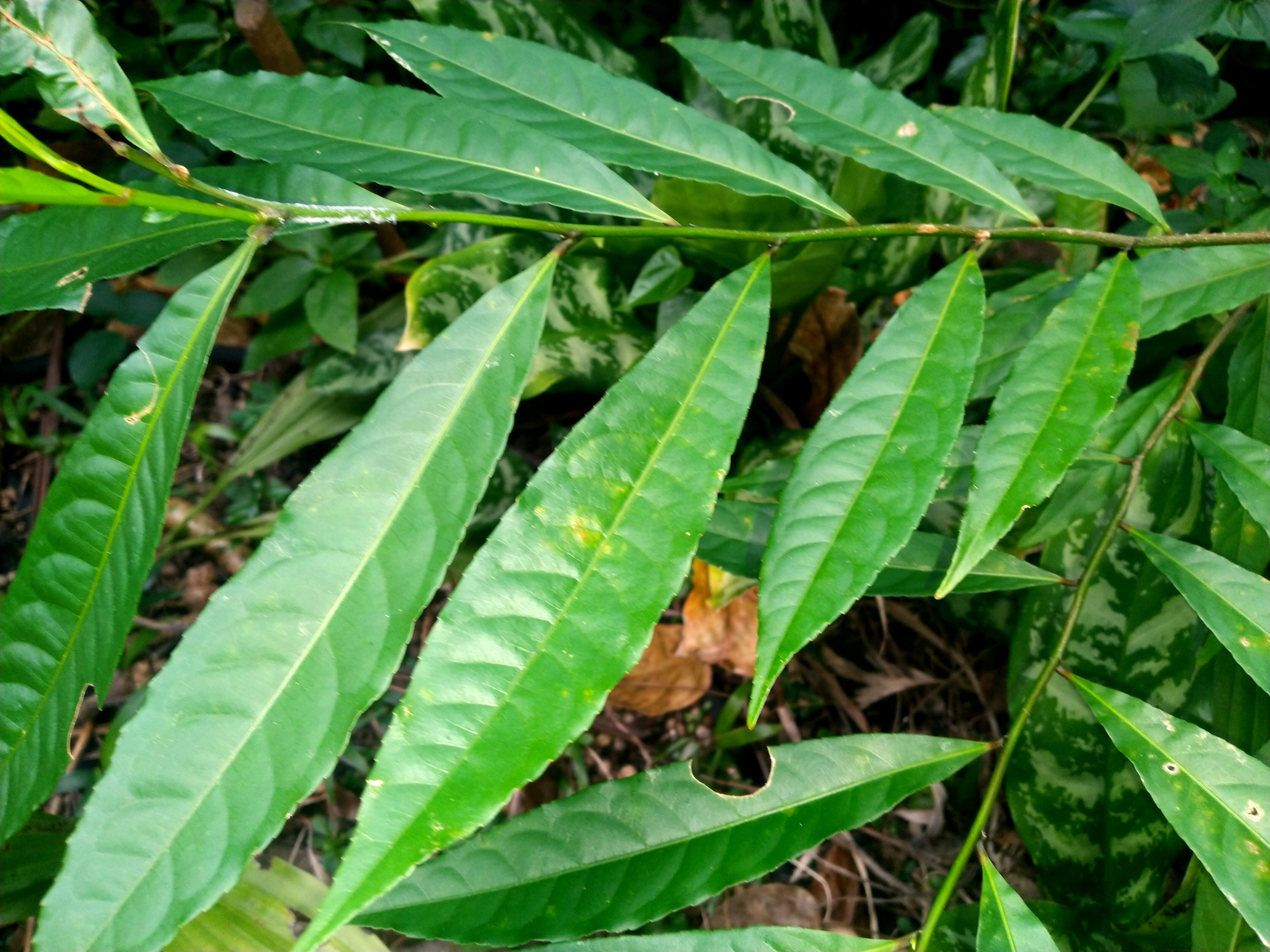
Leaves

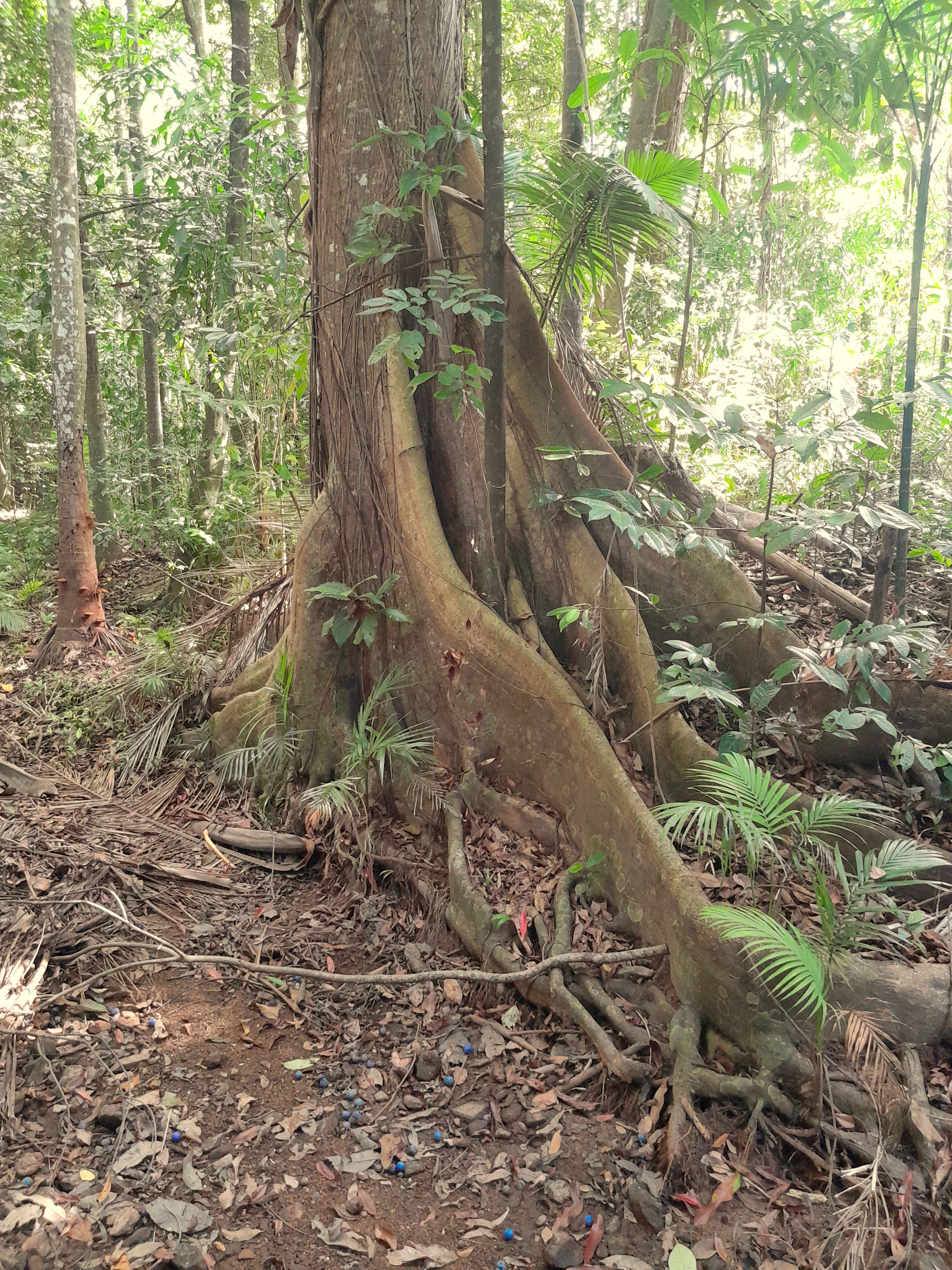
Large buttresses
