= Echiomima fabulosa =

Scientific classification
- Kingdom: Animalia
- Phylum: Arthropoda
- Class: Insecta
- Order: Lepidoptera
- Family: Xyloryctidae
- Genus: Echiomima
- Species: E. fabulosa

Binomial name
- Echiomima fabulosa Meyrick, 1915

Species of moth

Echiomima fabulosa is a moth in the family Xyloryctidae. It was described by Edward Meyrick in 1915. It is found in Australia, where it has been recorded from Queensland.

The wingspan is about 34 mm for males and 43 mm for females. The forewings of the males are pale ochreous, tinged with brownish along the costa, especially posteriorly, and with faint pinkish towards the dorsum and termen. The female forewings are light lilac brownish with the second discal stigma faint and fuscous. The hindwings of the males are light ochreous yellowish, while they are fulvous ochreous in females.

The larvae feed on Pongamia pinnata. They bore in the stem of their host plant.
