= Eschatura lemurias =

Scientific classification
- Kingdom: Animalia
- Phylum: Arthropoda
- Class: Insecta
- Order: Lepidoptera
- Family: Xyloryctidae
- Genus: Eschatura
- Species: E. lemurias

Binomial name
- Eschatura lemurias Meyrick, 1897

Synonyms
- Phloeophorba codonoptera Turner, 1898

Species of moth

Eschatura lemurias is a moth in the family Xyloryctidae. It was described by Edward Meyrick in 1897. It is found in Australia, where it has been recorded from New South Wales and Queensland.

The wingspan is 28–30 mm for males and 34–35 mm for females. The forewings are whitish ochreous in males, while they are deep ochreous in females, in both with a strong shining whitish gloss. There is a grey-whitish discal spot edged with dark reddish-fuscous suffusion, which is ill defined. The hindwings are pale yellowish.

The larvae feed on Waterhousea floribunda and Elaeocarpus angustifolius. They bore in the stem of their host plant.
