= Echiomima viperina =

Scientific classification
- Kingdom: Animalia
- Phylum: Arthropoda
- Class: Insecta
- Order: Lepidoptera
- Family: Xyloryctidae
- Genus: Echiomima
- Species: E. viperina

Binomial name
- Echiomima viperina Meyrick, 1915

Species of moth

Echiomima viperina is a moth in the family Xyloryctidae. It was described by Edward Meyrick in 1915. It is found in Australia, where it has been recorded from Queensland.

The wingspan is about 46 mm. The forewings are brown grey, irregularly tinged with light crimson-rosy suffusion. The second discal stigma is blackish. The hindwings are rosy ochreous.
