= Eschatura =

Scientific classification
- Kingdom: Animalia
- Phylum: Arthropoda
- Class: Insecta
- Order: Lepidoptera
- Family: Xyloryctidae
- Genus: Eschatura; Meyrick, 1897

Synonyms
- Phloeophorba Turner, 1898

Moth genus in family Xyloryctidae

Eschatura is a genus of moths of the family Xyloryctidae.

== Species ==
- Eschatura lactea (Turner, 1898)
- Eschatura lemurias Meyrick, 1897
