= Echiomima mythica =

Scientific classification
- Kingdom: Animalia
- Phylum: Arthropoda
- Clade: Pancrustacea
- Class: Insecta
- Order: Lepidoptera
- Family: Xyloryctidae
- Genus: Echiomima
- Species: E. mythica

Binomial name
- Echiomima mythica (Meyrick, 1890)

Synonyms
- Maroga mythica Meyrick, 1890; Maroga undosa T. P. Lucas, 1894

Species of moth

Echiomima mythica is a moth in the family Xyloryctidae. It was described by Edward Meyrick in 1890. It is found in Australia, where it has been recorded from New South Wales and Queensland.

The wingspan is 30–41 mm. The forewings are pale ochreous, towards the inner and hind margin somewhat brownish tinged. The costa and inner margin are narrowly suffused with yellowish brown and there is a round black dot in the disc at two-thirds. The hindwings are light ochreous orange.

The larvae feed on Ellatostachys xylocarpa, Cleistanthus cunninghamii, Waterhousea floribunda, Backhousia myrtifolia, Pongamia pinnata, Elaeocarpus angustifolius, Daphnandra species and Carya illinoinensis. They bore in the stem of their host plant.
