= Echiomima =

Scientific classification
- Domain: Eukaryota
- Kingdom: Animalia
- Phylum: Arthropoda
- Class: Insecta
- Order: Lepidoptera
- Family: Xyloryctidae
- Genus: Echiomima; Meyrick, 1915

Moth genus in family Xyloryctidae

Echiomima is a genus of moths of the family Xyloryctidae.

== Species ==
- Echiomima fabulosa Meyrick, 1915
- Echiomima mythica (Meyrick, 1890)
- Echiomima viperina Meyrick, 1915
