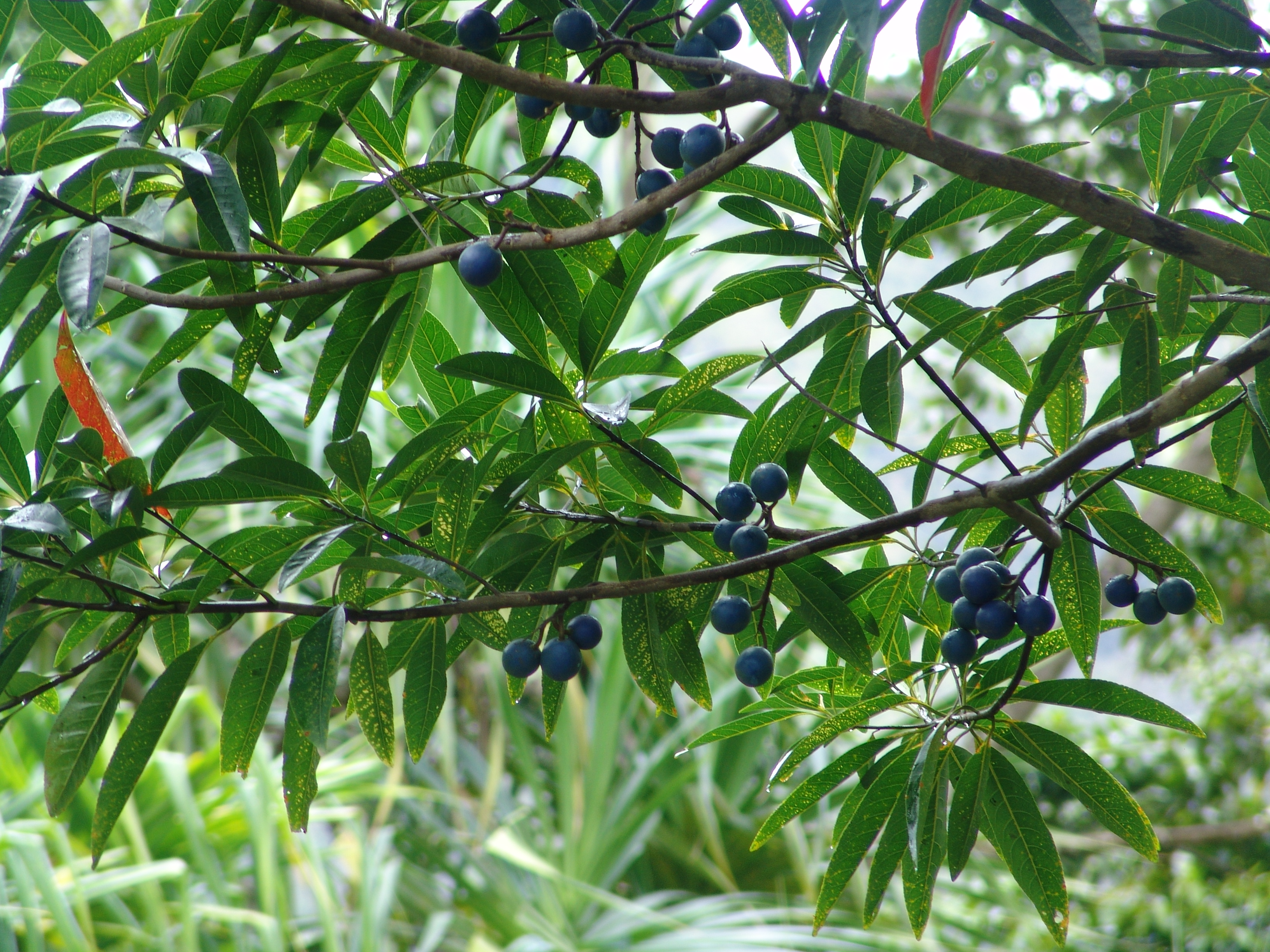

Conservation status
- Least Concern (IUCN 3.1)

Scientific classification
- Kingdom: Plantae
- Clade: Tracheophytes
- Clade: Angiosperms
- Clade: Eudicots
- Clade: Rosids
- Order: Oxalidales
- Family: Elaeocarpaceae
- Genus: Elaeocarpus
- Species: E. angustifolius

Binomial name
- Elaeocarpus angustifolius Blume

Synonyms
- List: Ayparia crenata Raf.; Elaeocarpus baclayanensis Elmer; Elaeocarpus crenatus (Raf.) Merr.; Elaeocarpus cyanocarpus Maingay ex Mast.; Elaeocarpus dolichopetalus Merr.; Elaeocarpus fauroensis Hemsl.; Elaeocarpus ganitrus Roxb. ex G.Don; Elaeocarpus hebridarum Knuth; Elaeocarpus major (Hochr.) Knuth; Elaeocarpus muellerianus Schltr.; Elaeocarpus novoguineensis Warb.; Elaeocarpus parkinsonii Warb.; Elaeocarpus polyschistus Schltr.; Elaeocarpus sphaericus Gaertn.) Ettingsh.; Elaeocarpus subglobosus Merr.; Elaeocarpus wenzelii Merr.; Ganitrus sphaerica Gaertn.

= Elaeocarpus angustifolius =

Species of flowering plant

Elaeocarpus angustifolius is a species of flowering plant in the family Elaeocarpaceae, that is native from India to New Caledonia and northern Australia. It is a large evergreen tree, often with buttressed roots, and has leaves with wavy serrations, creamy white flowers and more or less spherical bright blue edible fruit.

In English, the tree is known as utrasum bean tree in India. In Sri Lanka, local names include woodenbegar and Indian bead tree. It is simply known as elaeocarpus in the Northern Territory of Australia. Other names used for this tree in Australia are Indian oil fruit and genitri. In Hawaii it (or the possible synonym E. grandis) is known as a blue marble tree.

In India, the cleaned pits of the fruit of this tree are known as rudraksha (from Sanskrit: rudrākṣa, meaning "Rudra's teardrops" or "eyes") and are widely used as prayer beads, particularly in Hinduism. Rudraksha might be produced by more than one species of Elaeocarpus; however, E. angustifolius is the principal species used in the making of mala (garlands).

== Description ==
According to M.J.E. Coode, Elaeocarpus angustifolius is a tree that typically grows to a height of 40 m (130 ft) and usually has buttress roots at the base of the trunk. The leaves are about 60–180 mm (2.4–7.1 in) long, 40–60 mm (1.6–2.4 in) wide with wavy serrations on the edges and tapering to a petiole 5–15 mm (0.20–0.59 in) long, but lacking a pulvinus. Old leaves often turn bright red before falling. The flowers are arranged in racemes up to 100 mm (3.9 in) long, each flower on a pedicel 9–16 mm (0.35–0.63 in) long. The five sepals are 8–11 mm (0.31–0.43 in) long and 1–2 mm (0.039–0.079 in) wide. The five petals are creamy white, egg-shaped to oblong, 12–15 mm (0.47–0.59 in) long and 3–4 mm (0.12–0.16 in) wide, the tip with linear lobes. There are between thirty-five and sixty stamens and the style is 11–18 mm (0.43–0.71 in) long and glabrous. The fruit is a more or less spherical, bright blue or purple drupe 15–23 mm (0.59–0.91 in) in diameter. Note, however, that Coode considered E. grandis to be the same species as E. angustifolius, and the above description applies to both taxa.

Mature trees will grow massive buttresses which generally completely encircle the base of the trunk. This may be an adaptation to becoming emergents in some habitats, or often growing in secondary woodland—buttress roots can better distribute tensile stress in the base of the tree transmitted down from wind in the crown. In E. angustifolius the buttresses are thought to develop in response to stresses experienced by the tree during comparatively brief periods of fast development. The buttress wood has a partially different composition than the wood of the trunk.

=== Fruit ===
It is an evergreen tree that grows quickly. The tree starts bearing fruit in three to four years.

The blue-coloured drupes of the tree contain large stones or pits, which are covered by an outer husk of fruit flesh. This blue colour is not derived from a pigment, but is caused by structural colouration. The fruit weigh 7g on average, but range from 10 to 4g. The stone at the centre of the fruit, technically a pyrena, is typically divided into multiple segments, which are locules, each usually bearing a seed.

=== Infraspecific variability ===
No infraspecific forms are recognised. Populations in the periphery of the distribution exhibit a range of morphological characters which do not betray much biogeographical structuring, i.e. individuals can be found in New South Wales which may look almost identical to individuals in Malaysia or Fiji. However, in the centre of the distribution, the islands of Indonesia and in the Malay Peninsula, there are a number of confusingly divergent populations. In general, populations in this area can be divided into two main groups, larger leafed and flowered, and smaller leafed and flowered.

A long history of use by man may have confused the issue further. It is possible the long-distance trade has mixed lineages, or influenced the distribution of specific types. The species is often cultivated as an urban street tree in Indonesia and Malaysia. It appears that the larger leafed form is more often selected for planting as a street tree here. This appears to already be the case on Java over a century ago, based on the collection notes accompanying herbarium specimens.

A closer look at the stones used in classic mala garlands also reveals some interesting issues. It is the smaller stones which are traditionally worth the most, and many of the stones in the garlands are only 7mm in diameter, while known stones in museums collected by botanical collectors are all larger, 10mm and up. Not only that, special powers are ascribed to stones with more than the usual five facets, with those having more facets commanding a higher price. Prayer beads with up to 20 facets are known, but botanists have always collected ones with 5–7 facets, rarely 4 or 8. The small size may be due to a special cultivation technique (see section on Uses below) or an as yet unknown race or species, and it is possible there has been some limited selection by people involved in the trade—it is possible that there are, or once were, special cultivars grown for their superior stones.

A study of the fruit and stones in Sri Lanka found that variation in characteristics such as size and colour were highly influenced by the individual trees, as opposed to season or location. The authors opine that it is indeed possible that specific individual trees are cultivated for their fruit and stone qualities.

=== Similar species ===
It is a widespread and variable species, and many regional populations of E. angustifolius were considered to be different species in the past, but these are at present all considered the same species. An exception is the taxon E. grandis, although it cannot reliably be told apart from the E. angustifolius and was considered the same species by the last Elaeocarpus expert taxonomist, it remains recognised in parts of Australia: plants in Queensland and New South Wales are considered E. grandis, those found growing elsewhere are E. angustifolius. A 2013 PhD thesis by Yumiko Baba which compared a number of genetic sequences of different taxa found that E. grandis was indistinguishable from E. angustifolius in most studied sequences, but that in one sequence with more variety, her two E. grandis samples (one from Hawaii as E. sphaericus) were found to be within the diversity of E. angustifolius, with the two samples in fact more divergent from each other than from other samples within the E. angustifolius synonymy.

E. grandis/angustifolius can, however, be told apart from other species of Elaeocarpus by having petals much divided at the apex; small, round fruit; 5-7 locules per stone; straight embryos; and glabrous leaves with even and fine serrations along their margins. The most similar species in Northern Territory is E. arnhemicus; this species has leaves which are less long and more wide, stamens without bristles, and fruit which are ellipsoid in shape as opposed to round.

Overall, Coode found E. ptilanthus to be the most similar species, and very difficult to tell apart without the fruit. Whereas E. angustifolius is largely a lowland species, E. ptilanthus is found in highlands and cloud forests. Coode notes that the crowns are different, that of E. ptilanthus being dark, dense and umbrella-like, as opposed to light and spreading. The leaves are leathery, darker and shinier on top. The most important difference is seen in the fruit; E. ptilanthus has twice-as-large fruit with fibrous flesh, E. angustifolius is more juicy. The stone is very different in E. ptilanthus, the ornamentation having developed into numerous holes and arches, through which the strong fibres run, making cleaning a stone difficult.

These arches are usually flattened and long, and curve towards the apex of the stone. The stone is also shaped differently, it is ellipsoid or ovoid, not round. A study comparing a number of gene sequences, however, found that a E. ptilanthus sample was largely indistinguishable from E. angustifolius, with the exception of one more variable sequence, where it was nested within different E. angustifolius samples.

== Taxonomy ==
Writing from the island of Ambon in the Moluccas in the mid-16th century, the German-Dutch soldier, merchant and botanist Georg Eberhard Rumphius provided the first modern binomial description of the species in his work Herbarium Amboniense, in which he introduced the species to European science as Ganitrus Ganitri. Few ever read the work at the time, as it was considered a trade secret by the V.O.C., and published long after Rumphius had died. When Carl Linnaeus introduced his new standard of taxonomic nomenclature, he missed out on using this work, as he only received his copy after having worked on the 1753 edition of his Species Plantarum. The specific epithet ganitrus was derived from ganitri, the name for this species in Sundanese and Malay.

When Linnaeus published his Species Plantarum, he listed only one species of Elaeocarpus, referring it to the 1747 formal description, as well as an illustration, of "Elaiocarpus serrata" given by Johannes Burman in his book Thesaurus zeylanicus. which Linnaeus used as reference in his work.

In 1791, long before the International Code of Botanical Nomenclature (ICBN) rules had been formalised, in his book on the fruits and seeds of plants, Joseph Gaertner renamed the genus from Elaeocarpus to Ganitrus again, arguing that as Rumphius had been the first to formally describe the species, his name should have taxonomic priority. The only species he placed in this genus was G. sphaerica. This is not what is known as 'good species'; it is a frankenstein, composed of the description of Johannes Burman's 1747 Elaiocarpus serrata and an illustration of the fruit and the seeds of Rumphius's Ganitrus Ganitri. Gaertner also cites Linnaeus's Elaeocarpus serratus in the synonymy, which according to the ICBN rules is the only valid taxon name. Some taxonomists believed this invalidates the name altogether, in 1980 the French botanists Christiane Tirel and Jean Raynal stated that because Gaertner had cited Linnaeus's Elaeocarpus serrata, that means that the type was automatically that of Linnaeus's E. serrata (collected in Sri Lanka in the 1670s by the German-Dutch botanist Paul Hermann for his 'Ceylon Herbarium', bound volumes of actual plant specimens, also later published as a list). Nonetheless, the International Plant Names Index cites ICBN Melbourne Code Article 52.2 and emphasise that Gaertner "did not cite E. serratus nor its type", although he did cite E. serratus. Because it was built up using at least two species, this name is a synonym pro parte of both species, according to the botanist M.J.E. Coode, an Elaeocarpus expert. Gaertner was not followed in his idea to move the genus to a pre-Linnaean name by most botanists, in the next century a newer crop of botanists described new species of the genus using Linnaeus's name.

For example, the name Elaeocarpus angustifolius was first introduced in 1825 by the again German-Dutch Carl Ludwig Blume in his book Bijdragen tot de Flora van Nederlandsch Indie from material collected in the "mountains of Buitenzorg Province". This name was accompanied by an adequate species description, and a reference to an extant type (kept today in Leiden). As this is the first valid name, i.e. correctly described and effectively published name in the correct genus available in the Linnaean system, this name takes priority as the correct name for the species.

=== Synonymy ===
Other nations in Europe were beginning to build empires of their own, and where their fleets went, their botanists soon followed. As such the species was described numerous times throughout its vast distribution. The first (true) synonym, Elaeocarpus ganitrus, was coined in 1814 by the superintendent of the Calcutta Botanical Garden, William Roxburgh, in a simple list of names he intended to give to plants found growing in the garden, titled Hortus Bengalensis. Because Roxburgh did not add any descriptions to this bare list, it is impossible to know what he was talking about. These names should thus all have been considered to be invalid nomina nuda, and should have been ignored, but at least as far as this species is concerned, the 1832 version of the posthumous publication of Roxburgh's manuscript for a Flora Indica validated this name, i.e. E. ganitrus Roxb. ex. Roxb.. Nonetheless, it was generally rendered E. ganitrus Roxb. for most of the 19th century and later.

Around the turn of the century, the editors of the Index Kewensis had begun to realise that many old names from taxonomists in other European countries had not been registered, and many of the names of certain British scientists were not actually validly published, such as those of Roxburgh. In 1925, George Don's rather unscientific, but quite complete, 1831 gardening dictionary A General History of the Dichlamydeous Plants was rediscovered, and Roxburgh's name is now considered first validated in this work. Of the nine Elaeocarpus names Roxburgh invented for the plants in the Calcutta garden, Don dismissed all of them as impossible to identify and probably just synonyms of species which had been described before by others, except for E. rugosus and E. ganitrus, for in the last case he recognised that the specific epithet meant it must be same plant as that of Rumphius almost two centuries earlier, supplied a summary description of it in his work and gave Ganitrus Ganitri as a synonym of Roxburgh's name. Although the description is not in Latin and would also fail as a validation according to the rules of the ICBN, it is published before these rules were promulgated, and therefore still 'counts' as a valid publication. However, Tirel and Raynal pointed out in 1980 that Roxburgh's E. ganitrus is doubly invalid: although it was first published in 1814, it was only effectively published in 1831 with Don, six years after Blume's E. angustifolius, and the taxon which the name describes is ambiguous, because it is based on Gaertner.

In the 1895 issue of the influential series Die natürlichen Pflanzenfamilien, Karl Moritz Schumann classified the genus Elaeocarpus into four sections. In section Ganitrus he describes E. angustifolius/ganitrus as the type species, which he considers to actually be a synonym of Gaertner's 1791 name Ganitrus sphaerica, which he recombined as E. sphaericus. Schumann had written the work in or before 1890 already, and he was unaware at the time, like most other people, that Constantin von Ettingshausen had already recombined Ganitrus sphaerica two years before Die natürlichen Pflanzenfamilien had finally been published, in rather summary mention in a work on the fossil species of Tasmania. E. sphaericus thus has two authors, rendered auctorum multorum in taxonomic jargon. Because Ettingshausen had simply recombined the name, his version retains the synonym pro parte aspect of Gaertner's original name, but in Schumann's case he clearly identifies his name with the species E. angustifolius. Perhaps as a consequence of Die natürlichen Pflanzenfamilien, the species became known as E. sphaericus (Gaertn.) Schum. for almost the century in some regional floras, i.e. Indonesia and Australia.

In 1984, Coode regarded the taxon E. grandis as a synonym of E. angustifolius in his work Elaeocarpus in Australia and New Zealand, as it does not differ morphologically from the widespread and quite variable E. angustifolius. This was never entered into databases of native plants in Queensland, and in 2010 it was accepted as a valid species again by the Australian Plant Census. It was thus entered into the 2014 Atlas of Living Australia, which led it to be recognised again by the Plants of the World Online website as of 2022, despite Rafaël Govaerts noting the synonymy in 2001. Coode wrote again in 2010 in his study of E. angustifolius and its immediate relatives that as far as he can tell, E. grandis is the same plant as the normal common and widespread form of E. angustifolius as found throughout the region. There is no difference between E. grandis from New South Wales and E. angustifolius from Malaysia, the Solomon Islands or the Philippines.

E. hebridarum was described in 1941 by Reinhard Gustav Paul Knuth from specimens collected in Vanuatu, known at the time as the 'New Hebrides'. In 1982 the French botanist Christiane Tirel moved it, as well as E. polyschistus and E. persicifolius which had both been described from New Caledonia, into synonymy with E. angustifolius. E. macdonaldii is another possible synonym from Vanuatu described by Ferdinand von Mueller in 1893, which is/was missing from the Index Kewensis, but it may no longer be identifiable.

=== Classification ===
It is classified in the Ganitrus group of the genus Elaeocarpus, along with E. altisectus, E. avium, E. buderi, E. dolichostylus, E. fulvus, E. kaniensis, E. ornatus, E. osiae, E. ptilanthus, E. ramiflorus and E. trichopetalus. It is the only species within the section which has spread beyond the Malay Archipelago.

== Distribution ==
This species has a wide distribution stretching from the Himalayas in Nepal and India east to China and the Philippines, and south to Indonesia, Papua New Guinea and Australia.

=== China ===
It occurs in the wild in the provinces of Yunnan, Guangxi and Hainan.

=== Indian subcontinent ===
In the Indian subcontinent it grows in the Indo-Gangetic Plain in the foothills of the Himalayas. It grows on Sri Lanka, but it is not particularly common.

=== Pacific Islands ===
It is native to New Caledonia, Vanuatu, and the Santa Cruz Islands. It occurs on Fiji.

In New Caledonia it occurs across Grande Terre (from Prony Bay to Poum), the Isle of Pines (île des Pins) and the Loyalty Islands (Lifou, Maré, Ouvéa). Note that E. angustifolius has often been imported from Australia to New Caledonia as an ornamental plant, and according to the Australians these plants may technically actually be E. grandis, although this is a moot point if these two names are synonyms.

Specimens of E. angustifolius were planted in Oahu in the 1930s and have subsequently become naturalised in nearby forests. Note that the plants in Hawaii were introduced from Australia and may technically actually be E. grandis, although this is a moot point if these two names are synonyms.

The species is also reported to have been introduced from Australia and to invade intact and secondary forests in Samoa, although it may actually be native, and the report likely technically refers to E. grandis.

Although some sources state the species is native to Guam, this is a mistake. In the 1971 article The Flora of Guam, B. C. Stone recorded E. sphaericus (sensu Schum.) as being native to Guam. In a 1979 article in the same journal updating the wider flora of the region, A geographical checklist of the Micronesian Dicotyledonae, Fosberg et al. stated Stone's E. sphaericus (updated to E. angustifolius) was in fact E. joga. Confusingly, Fosberg et al. also state that E. grandis has been introduced to Palau. Coode writes in 2010 that E. joga, and its pro parte synonym E. carolinensis, needs to be re-examined (it falls outside the purview of his paper) to see if it truly is an independent species and not a synonym, and to which section of the genus Elaeocarpus it belongs—ike E. grandis, if it belongs to section Ganitrus this is a biogeographic oddity, all other species appear to have evolved in the Malay Archipelago. If it is a synonym, this would expand the native distribution to throughout the Mariana Islands and in the nation of Palau.

=== Australia ===
In the Northern Territory of Australia it is predominantly found on the Tiwi Islands and from Channel Point to Wadeye on the Northern Territory mainland where it grows to a height of about 25 m (82 ft). It was also formerly thought to occur in Queensland, but the Australian Plant Census states that the trees from this area were in fact E. grandis, according to them the name E. angustifolius was misapplied pro parte.

=== West Africa ===
It has been introduced to West Africa, at least to Sierra Leone.

== Ecology ==
It is typical of second-growth forest, large individuals found in what appears to be primary rainforest are believed to probably be elderly remnants of a time when the rainforest was less 'primary', i.e. when fires, storms or humankind disturbed it. It also is sometimes found in somewhat swampy sites, or at least along watercourses, and in more cultivated or even urban settings. In New Caledonia the property of growing in disturbed sites has been used in archaeology to look at the influence of humankind in the species composition of the rainforests. The long-term presence of humans increases the population of this species.

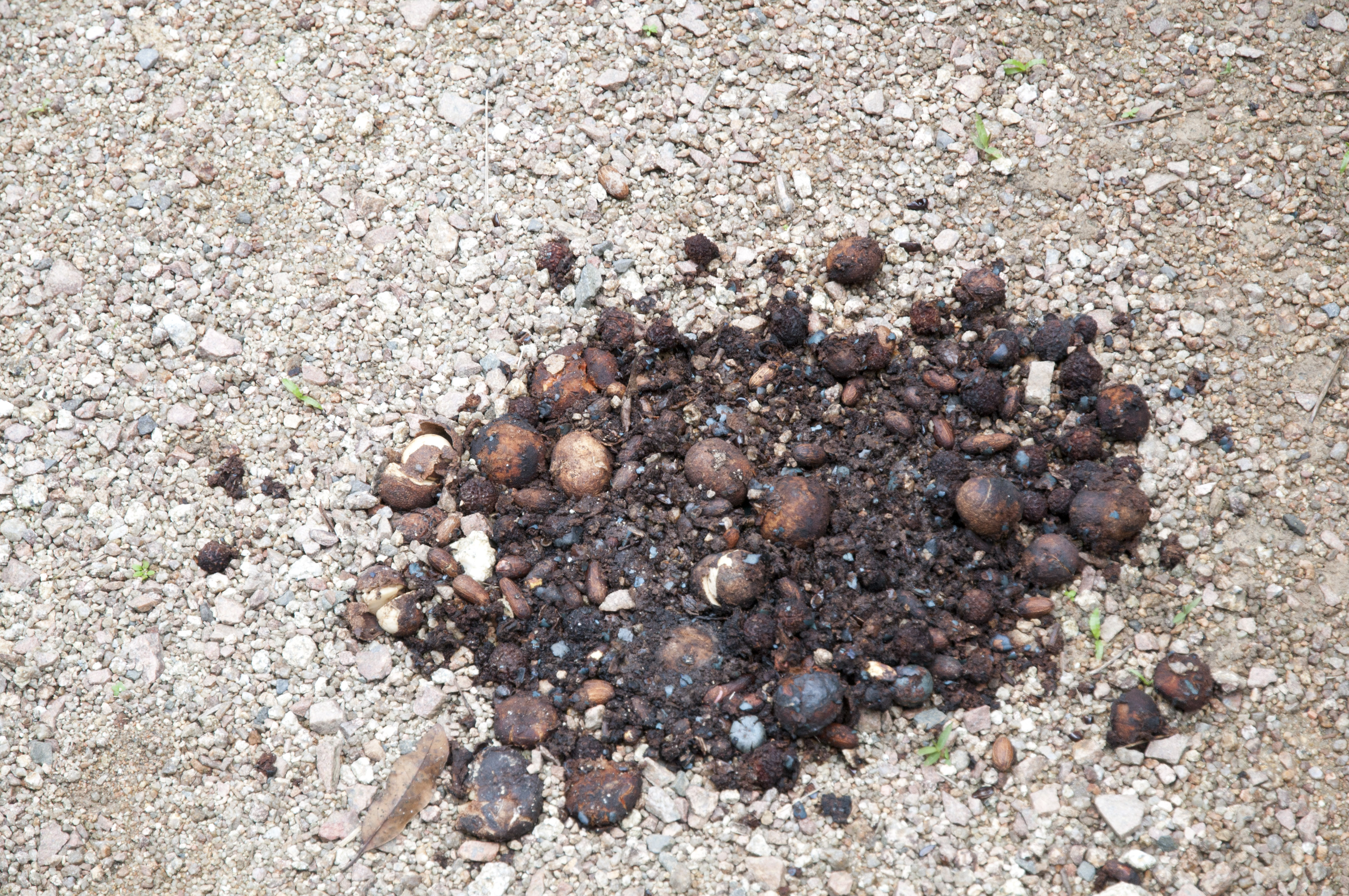
Cassowary faeces, containing seeds

Writing from Ambon Island in the mid 17th century, Rumphius described that the fruits are gladly eaten by large birds, mentioning that especially wreathed hornbills can be found feeding upon them. Fruit bats also do so. E. angustifolius was found to be one among a few dozen species of relatively large-fruited rainforest plants eaten by double-wattled cassowaries in northern Australia. These trees are at present called E. grandis, but it is almost certain that these flightless birds feed on the fruit and likely disperse the seeds, whatever the taxonomic position—they have been found to eat all types of Elaeocarpus fruit, as well as fruit of this genus on Seram and the Aru Islands, where E. angustifolius is present. Although seeds which are dispersed in cassowary dung do germinate, the percentage is quite low in Elaeocarpus as compared to other rainforest species eaten by the giant birds. A similar situation exists for tree-kangaroos (Dendrolagus spp.). A three-year study of the faeces of dwarf cassowaries in Papua New Guinea found that despite offering fruit continuously year-round, E. angustifolius (as E. sphaericus) was only really consumed in November, just before a 'lean' period with few plants in fruit in the rainforest, with some fruit taken in January. It was an unimportant part of the diet, possibly only eaten in times of low availability of more preferred fruit.

The flowers have been recorded to be visited by various beetles, flies and wasps.

== Chemical constituents ==
Chemicals present in E. angustifolius are elaeocarpidine, isoelaeocarpine, epiisoelaeocarpiline, rudrakine, flavonoids, quercetin, phytosterols, fat, alkaloids, carbohydrates, ethanol, proteins, tannins, gallic acid and ellagic acid. The alkaloid rudrakine was discovered in the E. angustifolius fruit in 1979.

== Uses ==
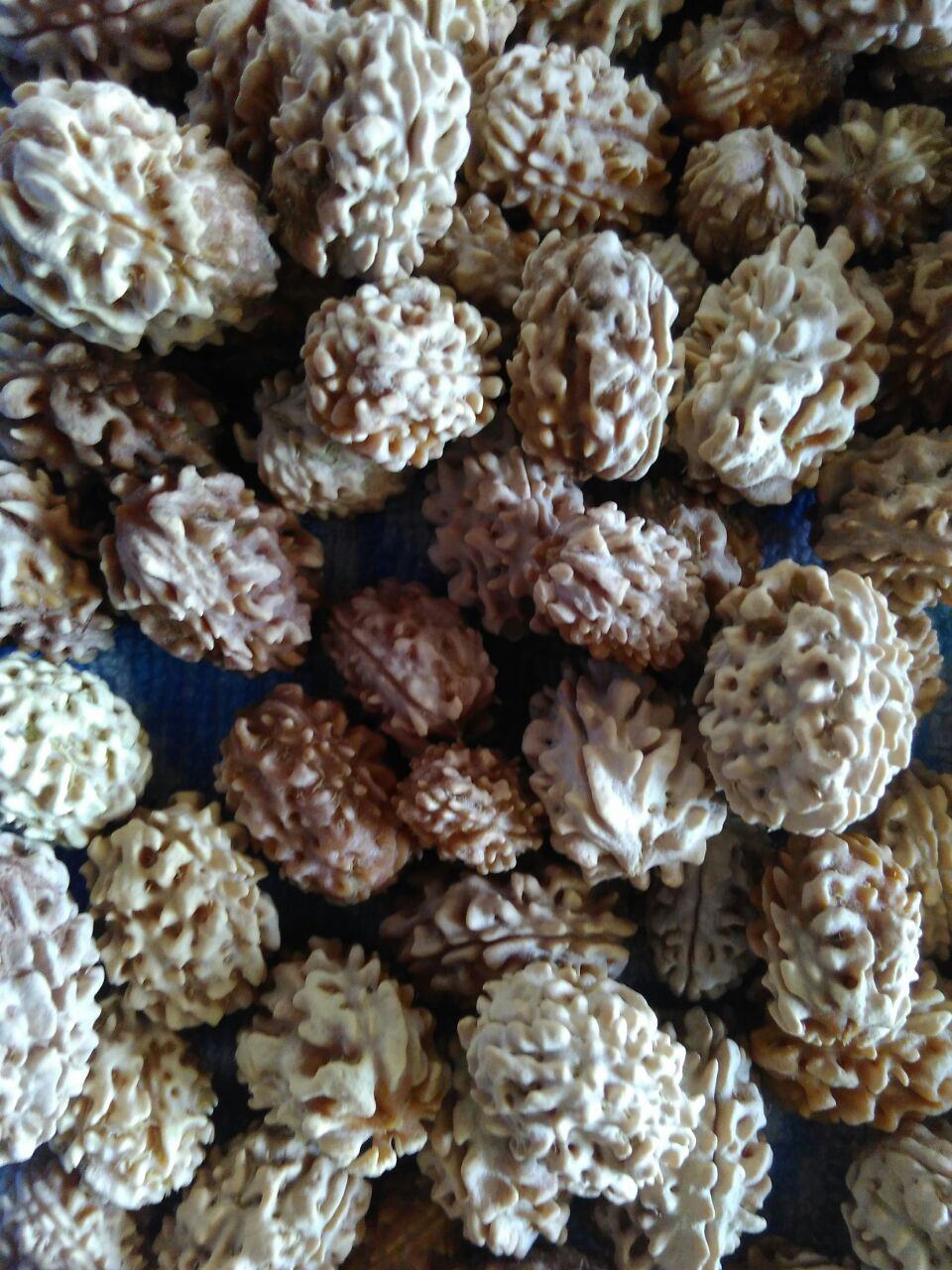
Dried rudraksha stones (pyrenas)

Hundreds of years ago this plant was an important article of international commerce, specifically, the burl-like stones containing the seeds. Rumphius describes that it was common practice across the islands of the Indonesian archipelago to trade in the stones, known as ganiter or ganitris in Malay, Javanese and Balinese—words known across the East Indies. Not all stones were valuable, the best were of a smaller size and were coloured deep brown. The stones often were collected from the defecations of cattle, for it was during the passage through the various stomachs of the cow that the stones gained the preferred colour, although less scrupulous dealers were wont to drown the stones in seawater to achieve a similar effect. Stones which had lain on the ground became a less appealing grey colour and thus had no value. A trader could collect some 3,000 Dutch pounds of the unsorted stones at a port in Java, Madura or Bali for only some 60 silver real, the merchant must then sort his cargo, retaining only the small and medium stones, and throwing out the rest. The middle-sized stones were not worth much, but for the small stones Hindus and Arab traders would pay good money, some 10 real for a handful of the stones, using them to make religious objects for their priests. A hole could be bored through them, and the stones could then be stringed up into chains, which were worn around the body in the same manner as European people do with corals in rosaries. Especially the Hindu priests were customers, but Muslim imams would also use the chains as prayer beads to recite Tasbih. The richest of the priests would string a golden nugget after every two ganiters, thus the Chinese called the stones kimkungtsi—'gold hard seeds'. Such was the worth of a good stone, that counterfeits were carved from hard wood, thus the Codjas were usually very savvy in telling apart the good stones from the false.

In some parts of Java, the local population used a special method of cultivation to ensure themselves of a harvest of the good stones. When the trees were just beginning the process of fructification, and the young fruit were just beginning to develop, long strips of the bark were pried off the main branches and some off the trunk—this forced the fruit to be stunted, which caused the stones to be smaller and more grooved.

=== Horticulture ===
In the US the cultivar 'Prima Donna' has been available, it has pink flowers. It may actually be E. reticulatus.

=== Common names and folklore ===
The Hindi vernacular name of both the tree and the stones is "rudraksha", from Sanskrit: rudrākṣa, a compound word consisting of the name Rudra ("Shiva") and akṣha ("teardrops" or "eyes"). The stones are widely used in Hinduism as prayer beads in the making of mala (garlands).

== Gallery ==
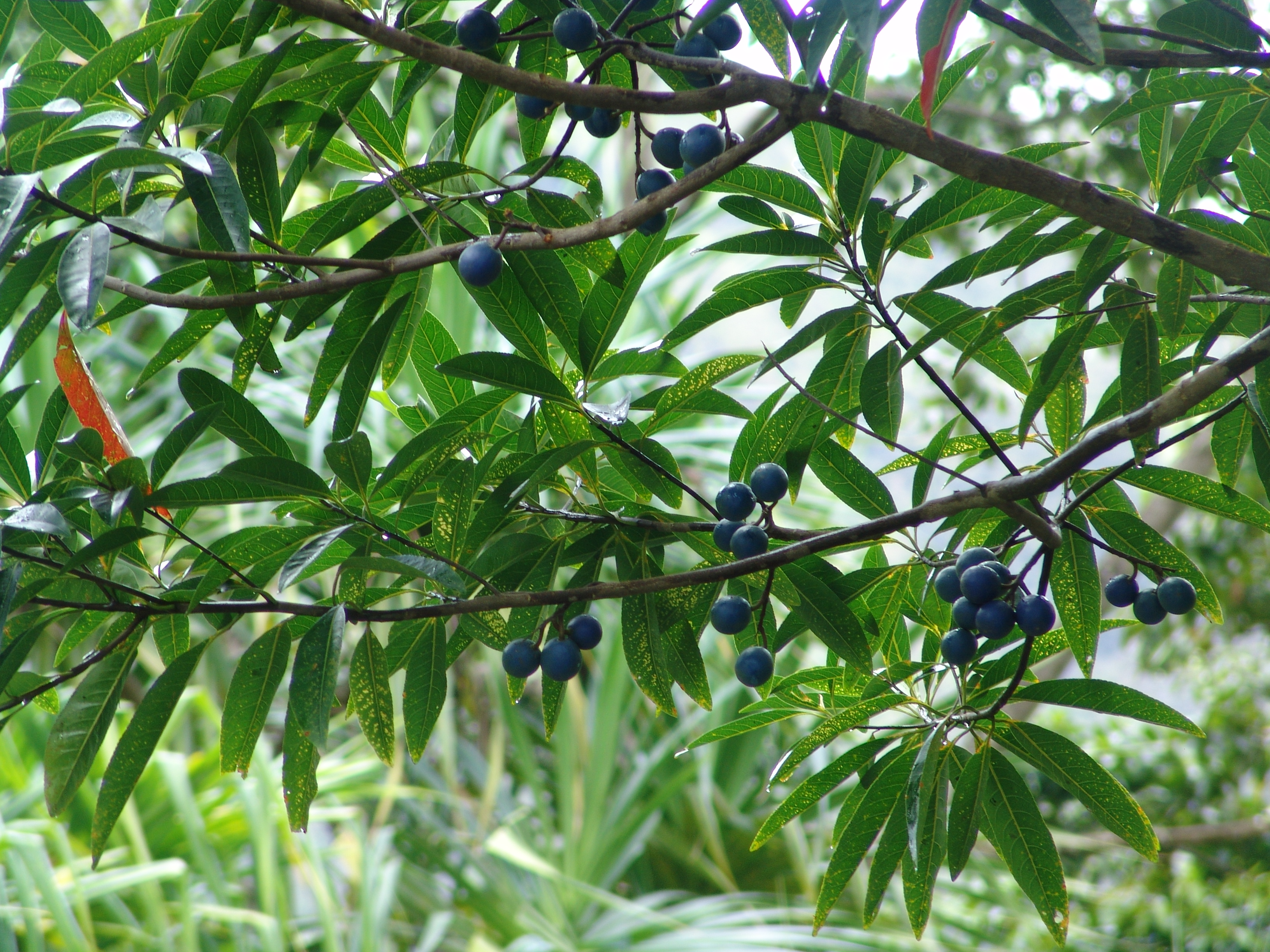
Blue marble tree in Ho'omaluhia Botanical Garden—may possibly be E. grandis

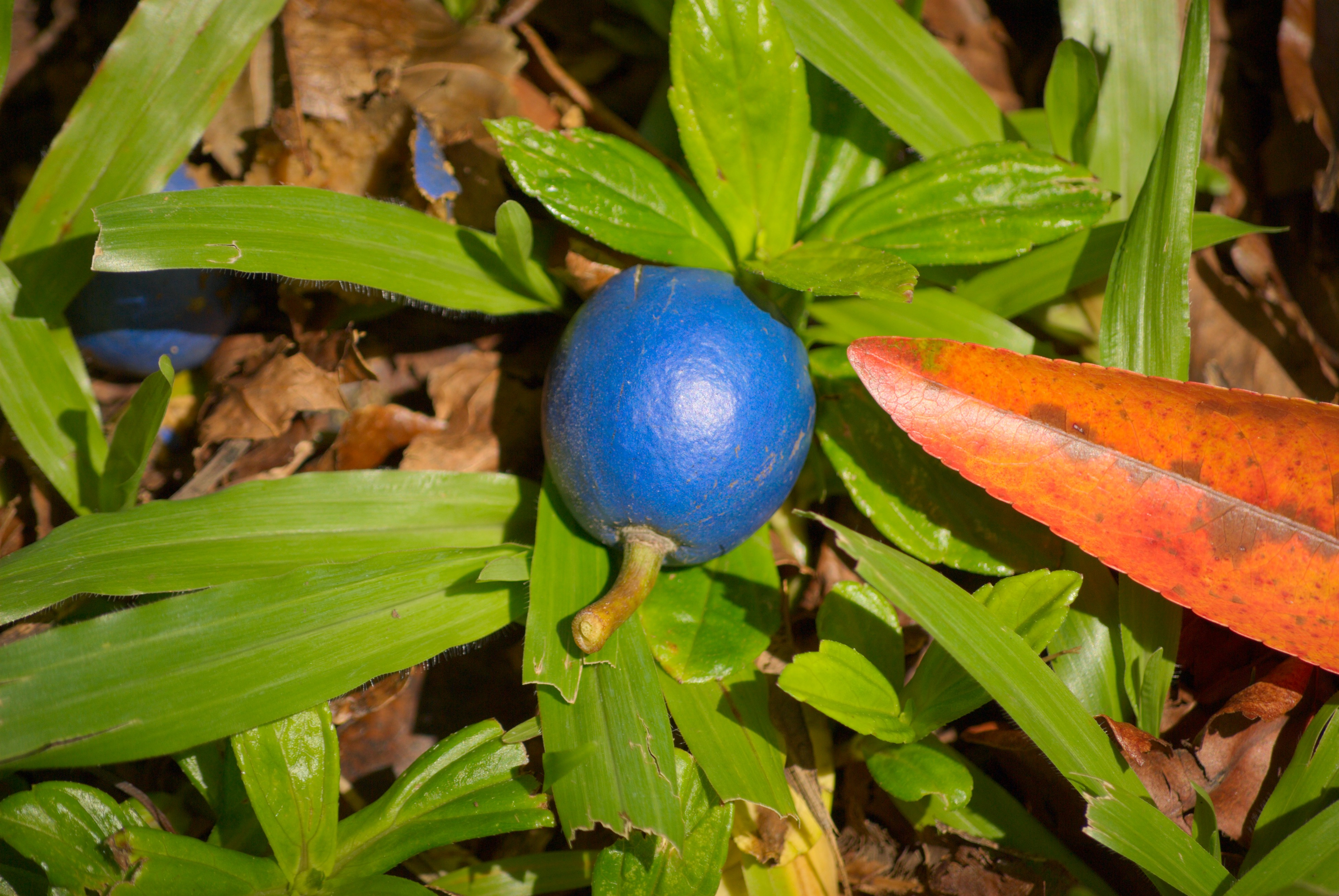
Closeup of fruit and leaves, in Hoʻomaluhia Botanical Garden—may possibly be E. grandis

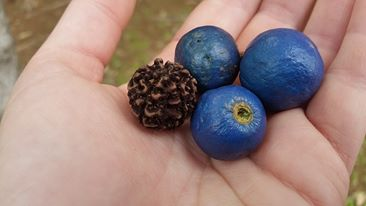
Three fruit and a pyrene—may possibly be E. grandis

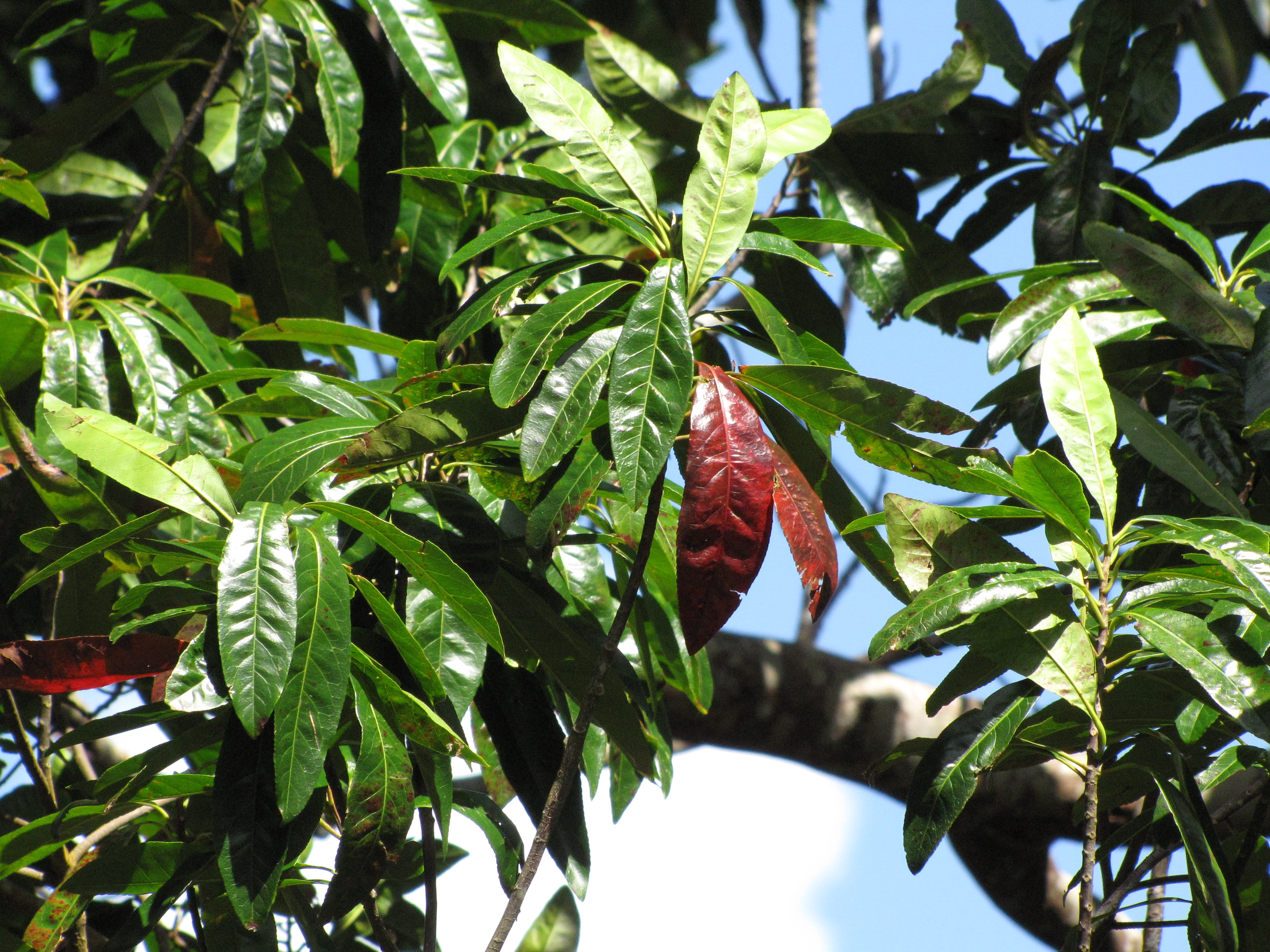
Leaves in Keʻanae Arboretum, Maui—may possibly be E. grandis

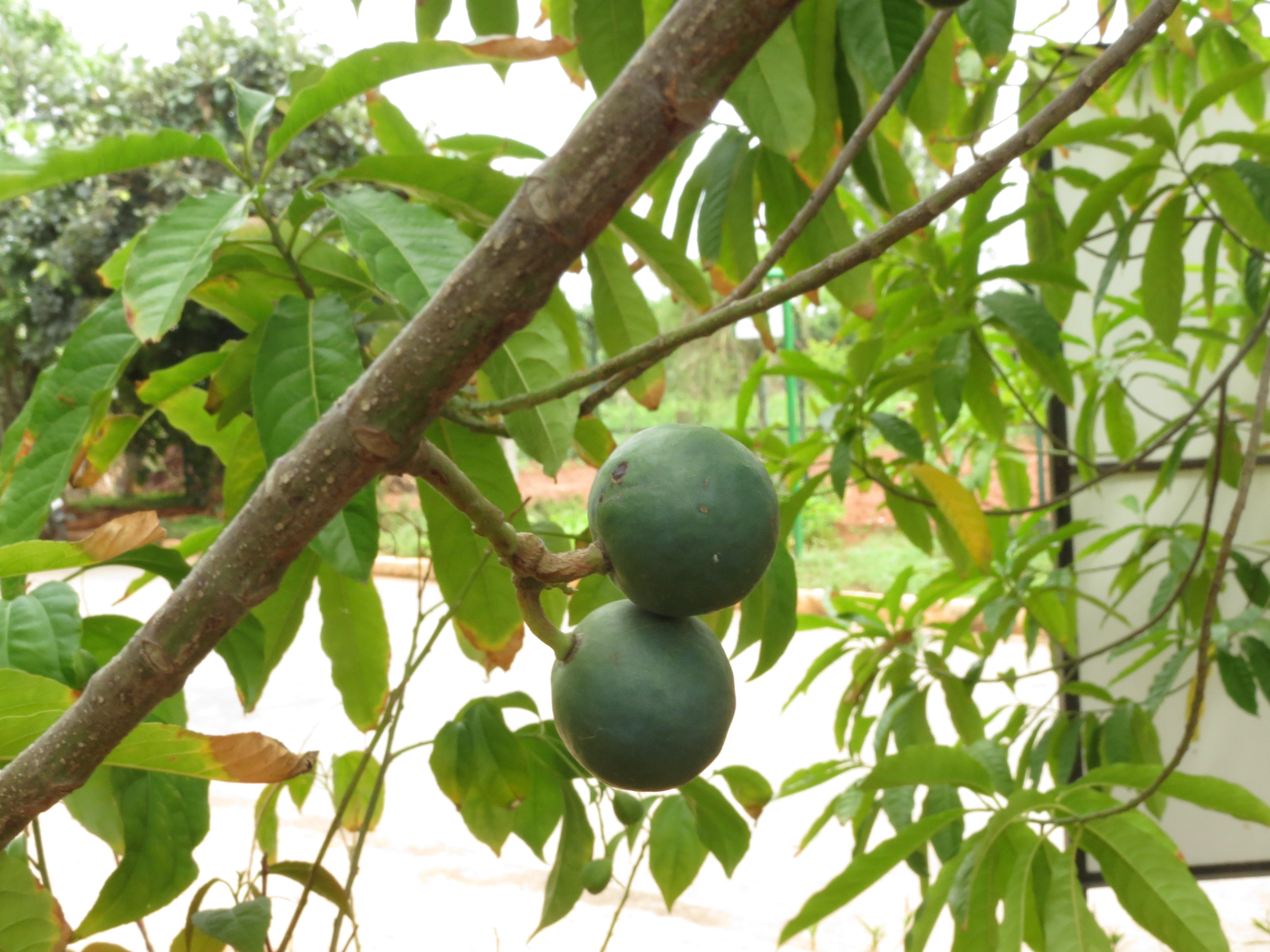
Fruits (drupes) on the tree

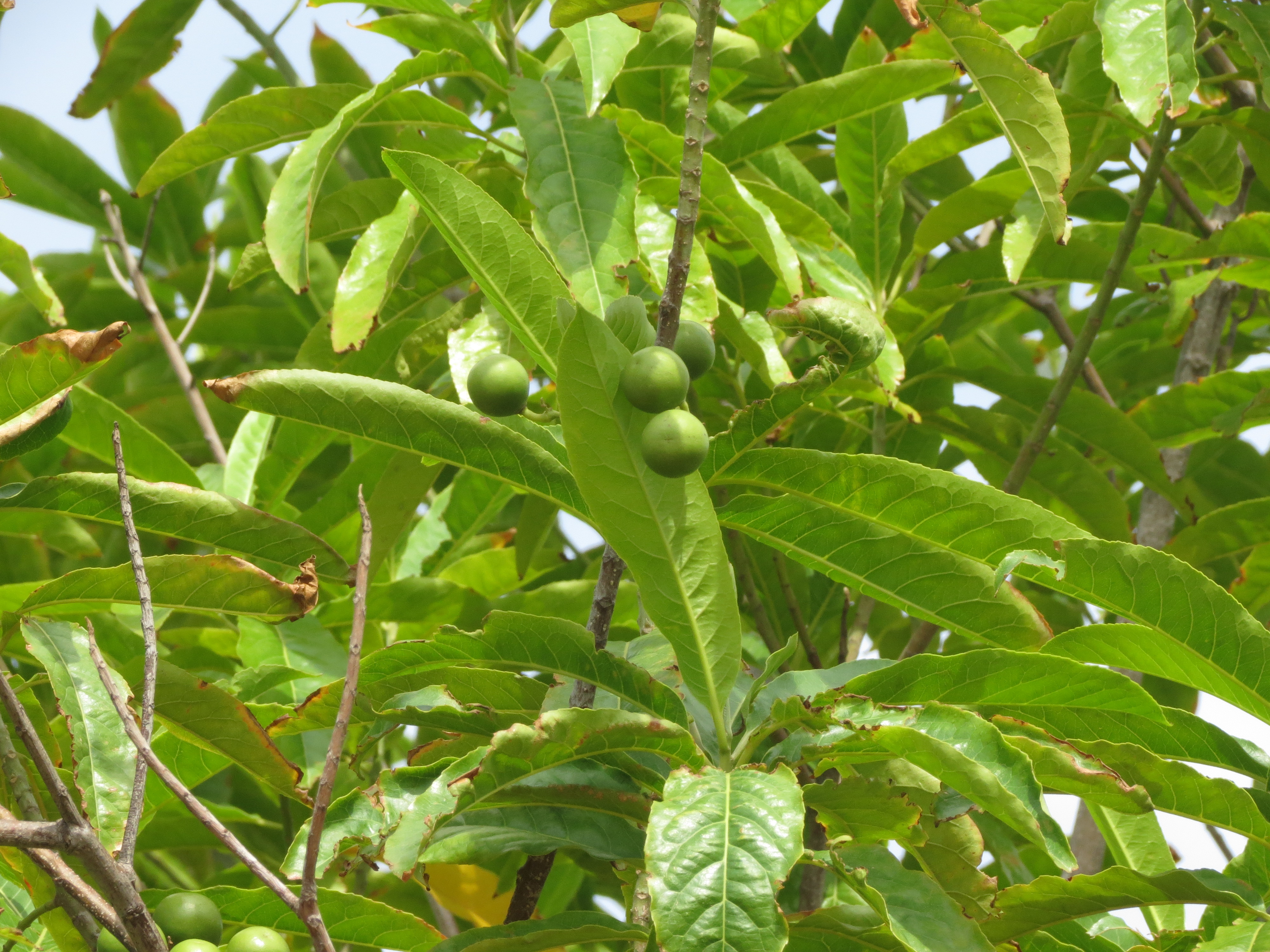
Fruits and leaves

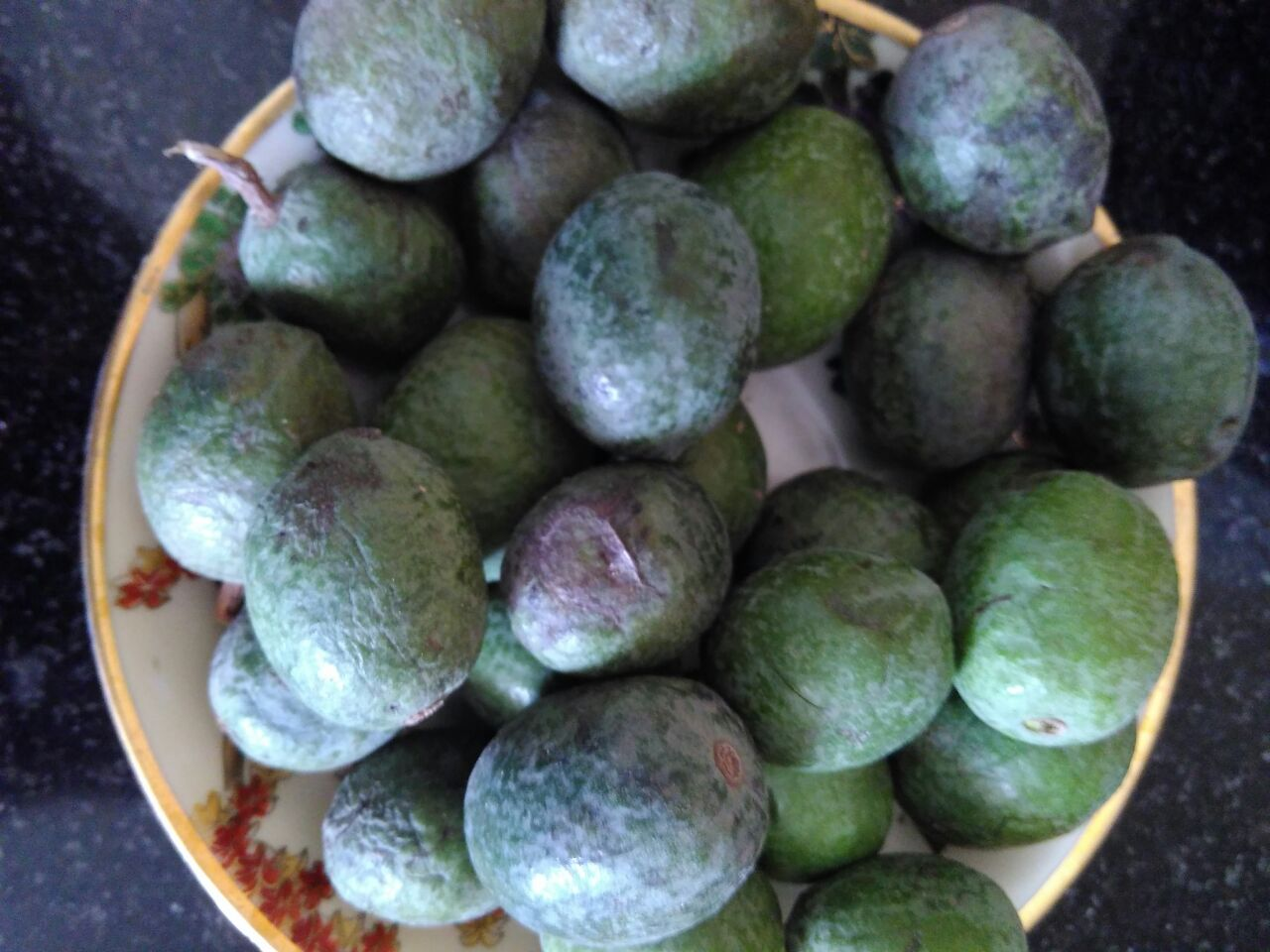
Ripe rudraksha fruit freshly plucked
