= Eschatura lactea =

Scientific classification
- Kingdom: Animalia
- Phylum: Arthropoda
- Clade: Pancrustacea
- Class: Insecta
- Order: Lepidoptera
- Family: Xyloryctidae
- Genus: Eschatura
- Species: E. lactea

Binomial name
- Eschatura lactea (Turner, 1898)

Synonyms
- Phloeophorba lactea Turner, 1898; Scieropepla nettomorpha Meyrick, 1930

Species of moth

Eschatura lactea is a moth in the family Xyloryctidae. It was described by Turner in 1898. It is found in Australia, where it has been recorded from Queensland.

The wingspan is 22–29 mm. The forewings are uniform milky-white, without markings and with a very faint indication of pale fuscous suffusion towards the hindmargin. The hindwings are white with a very faint indication suffusion towards the apex.

The larvae feed on Carya illinoinensis. They bore in the stem of their host plant.
