= Keʻanae Arboretum =

Arboretum and botanical garden in Maui, Hawaiʻi

Coordinates: 20.8547519°N 156.1503733°W

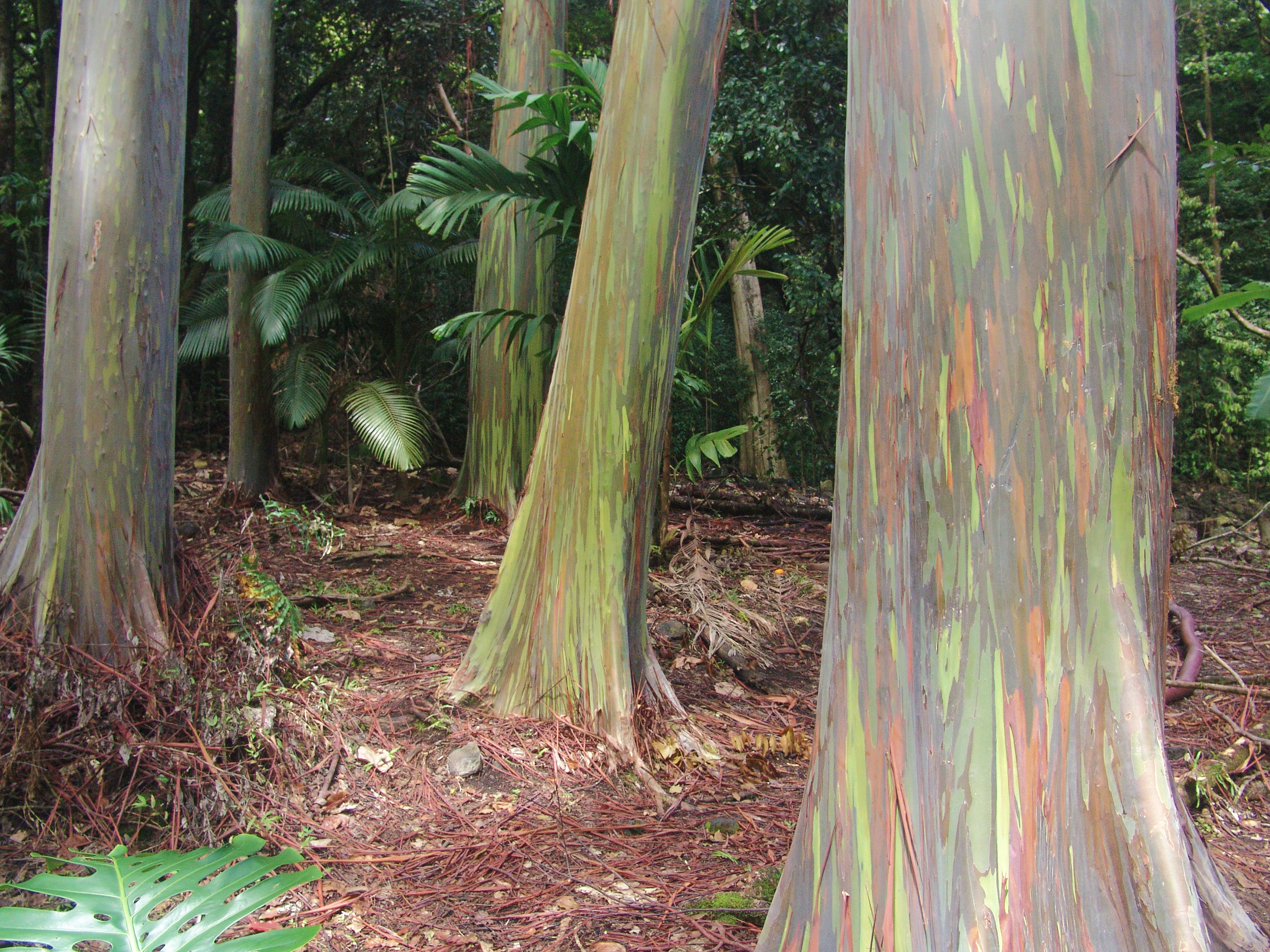
- Rainbow eucalyptus inside the arboretum.
- Interactive map of Keʻanae Arboretum
- Location: Maui

Keʻanae Arboretum (6 acres or 2.4 hectares) is an arboretum and botanical garden located on the Hana Highway (Highway 360) about 1-mile (1.6 km) west of Keʻanae, Maui, Hawaiʻi, United States.

Before the 1940s the land the Arboretum sits on was used to farm food, medicine and fiber-producing plants. From 1946 until the mid-1950s, it became an agricultural work site for prisoners at Ke'anae Prison Camp. It was established as an arboretum in 1971.

The arboretum lies alongside the Piinaau Stream on taro cultivation terraces and within a rainforest, and contains two short walking trails. It contains about 150 varieties of native and introduced tropical plants, including gingers, hibiscus, papaya, and various types of taro. Trees are labeled with common name, scientific name, and origin.

== See also ==
- List of botanical gardens in the United States
