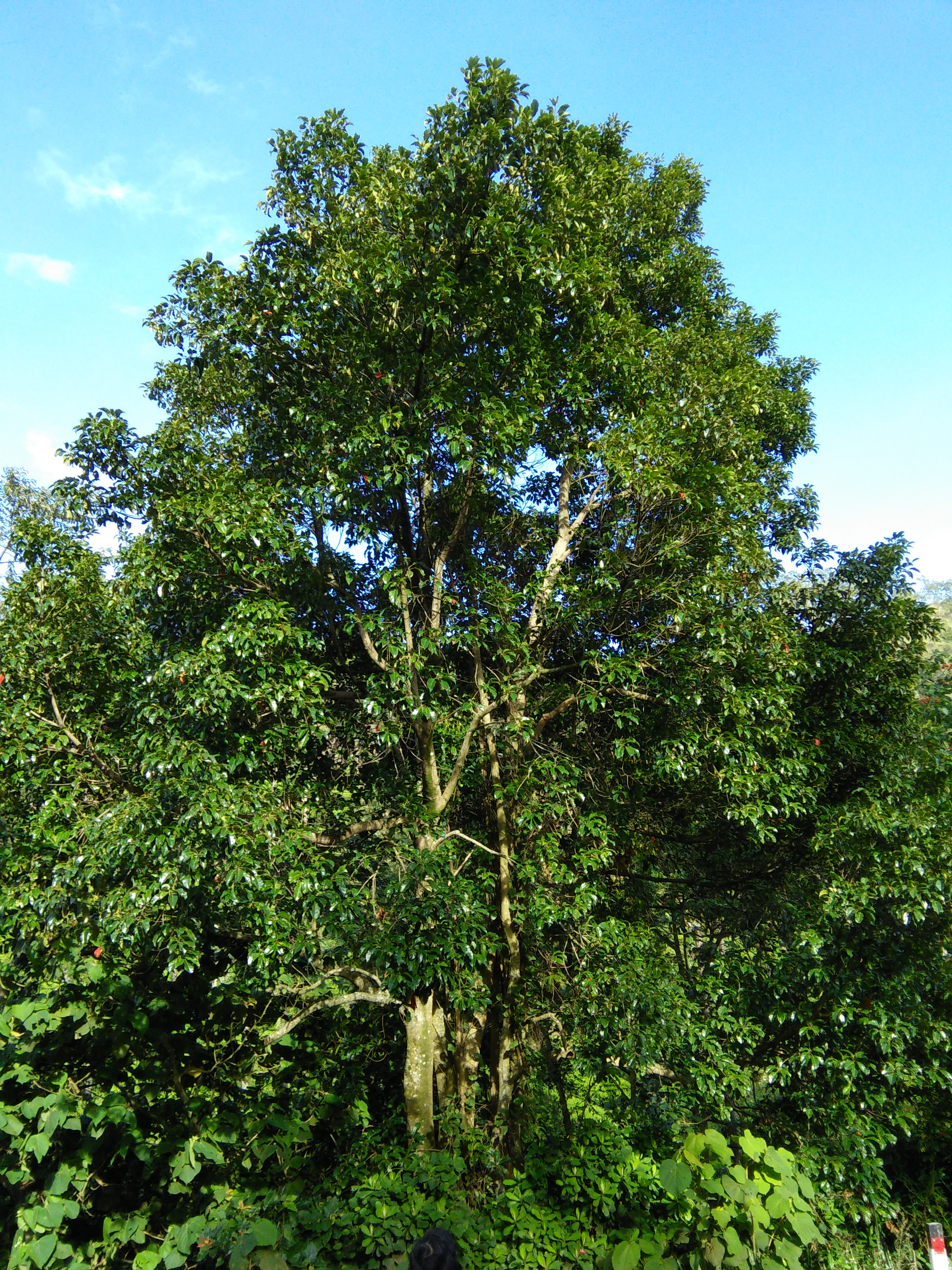

Scientific classification
- Kingdom: Plantae
- Clade: Tracheophytes
- Clade: Angiosperms
- Clade: Eudicots
- Clade: Rosids
- Order: Oxalidales
- Family: Elaeocarpaceae
- Genus: Elaeocarpus
- Species: E. serratus

Binomial name
- Elaeocarpus serratus L.

Varieties
- Elaeocarpus serratus var. weibelii Zmarzty

Synonyms
- Elaeocarpus adenophyllus Wall.; Elaeocarpus angustifolius Wight; Elaeocarpus barnardii Burkill; Elaeocarpus cuneatus Wight; Elaeocarpus malabaricus Oken; Elaeocarpus monogynus Murray; Elaeocarpus perim-kara DC.; Elaeocarpus perincara Buch.-Ham.; Ganitrus roxburghii Wight; Misipus serratus (L.) Raf.; Monocera serrata (L.) Turcz.

= Elaeocarpus serratus =

Species of flowering plant

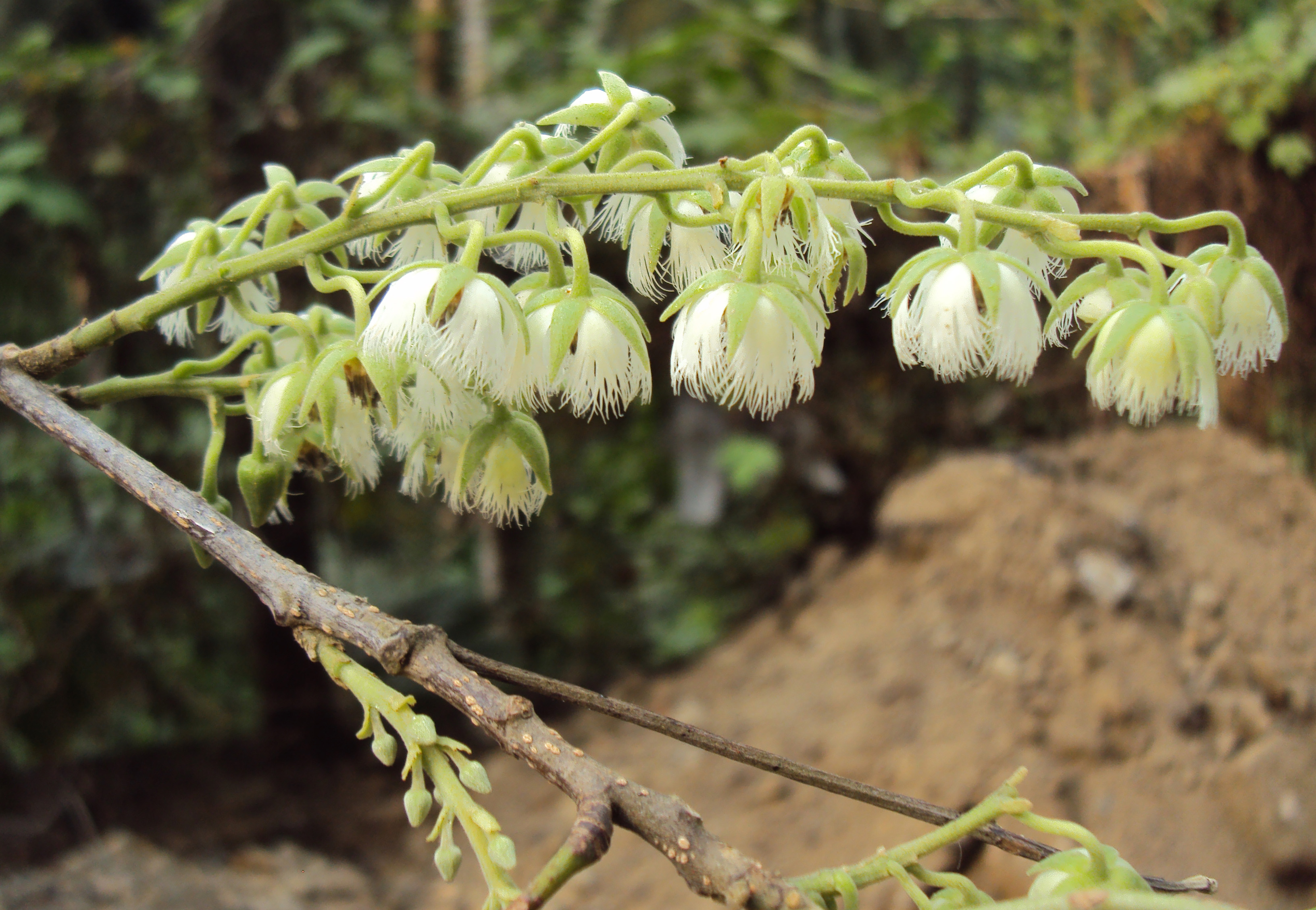
Flowers

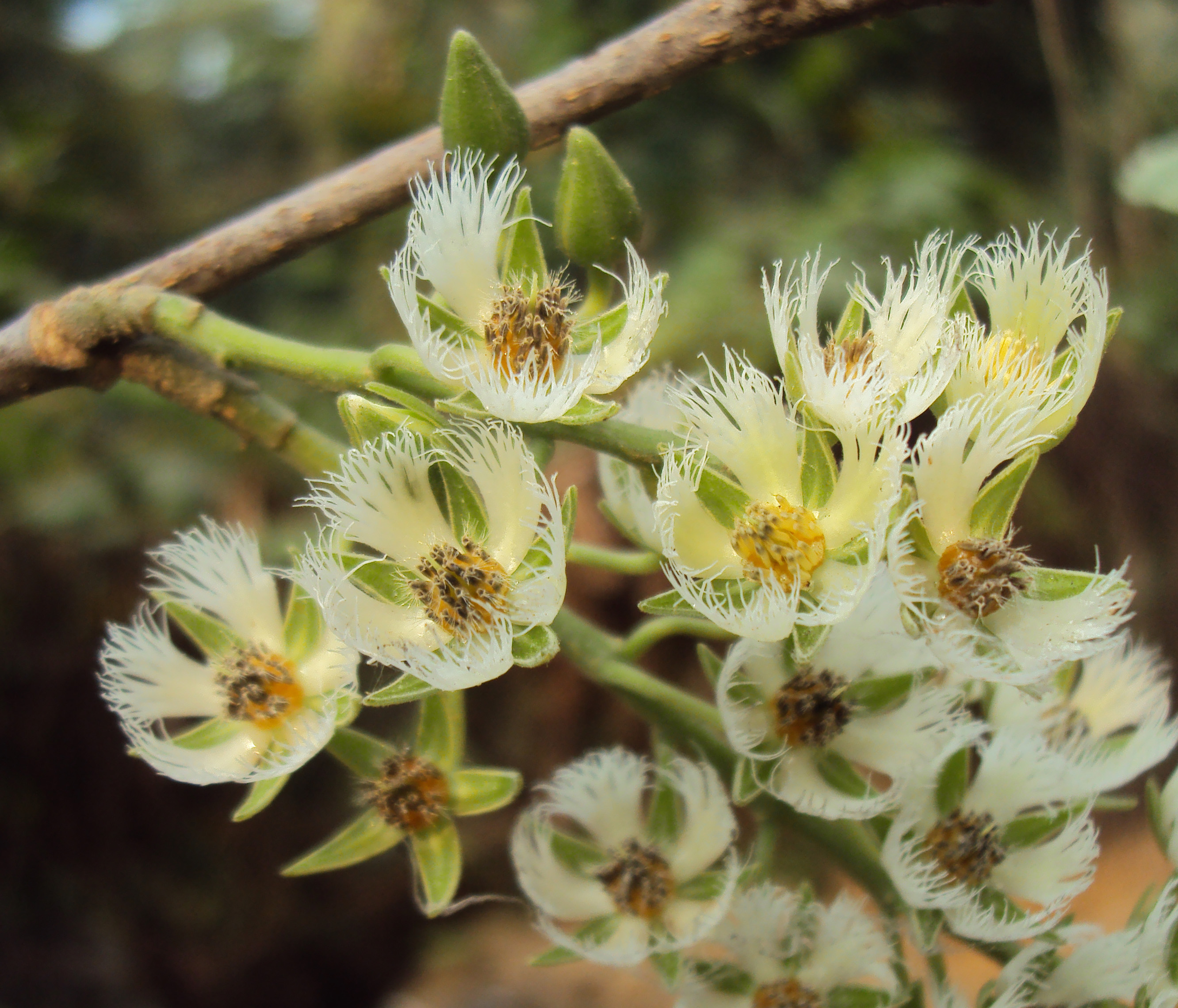
Flowers detail

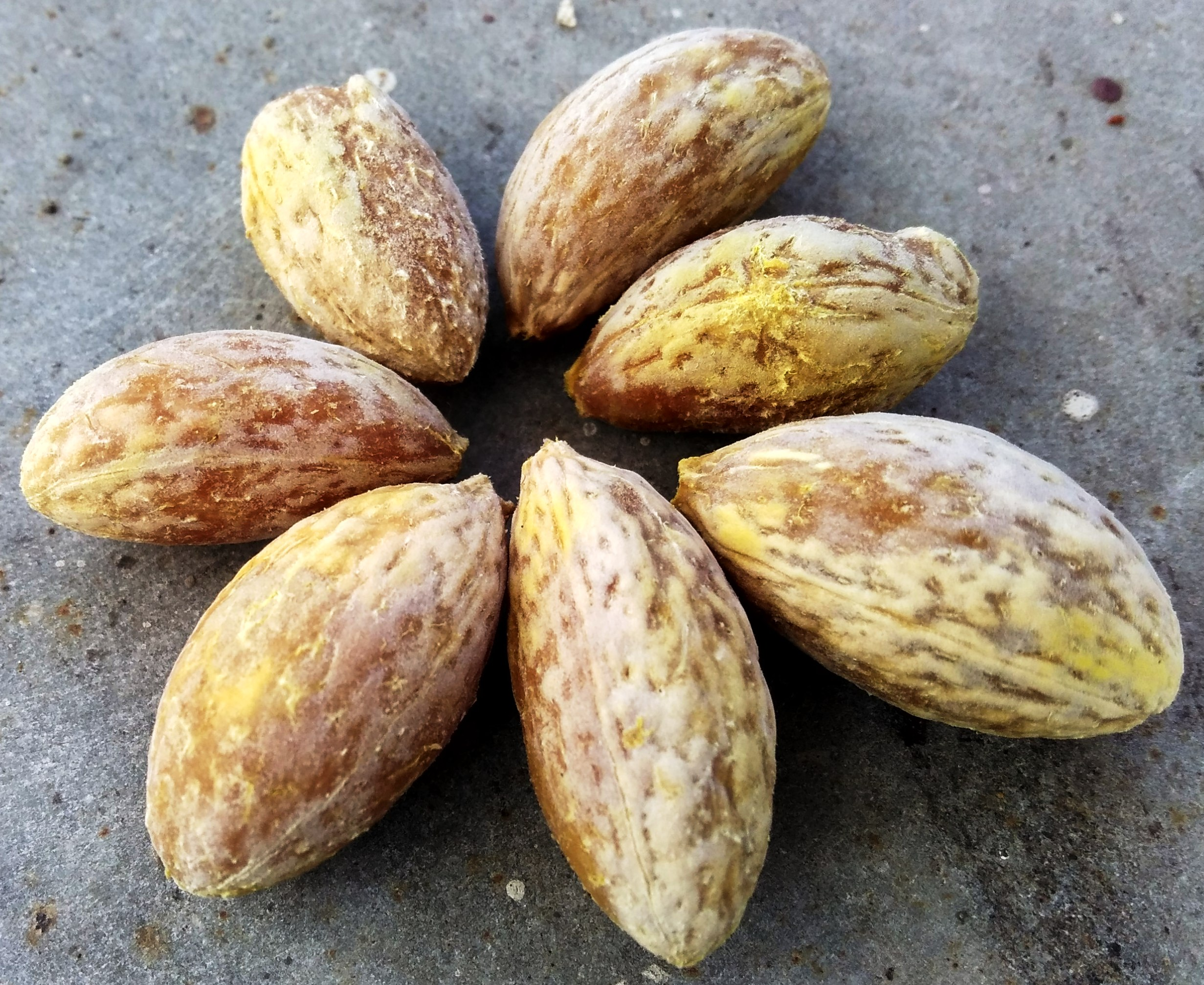
Ceylon-olive (Elaeocarpus serratus) seeds

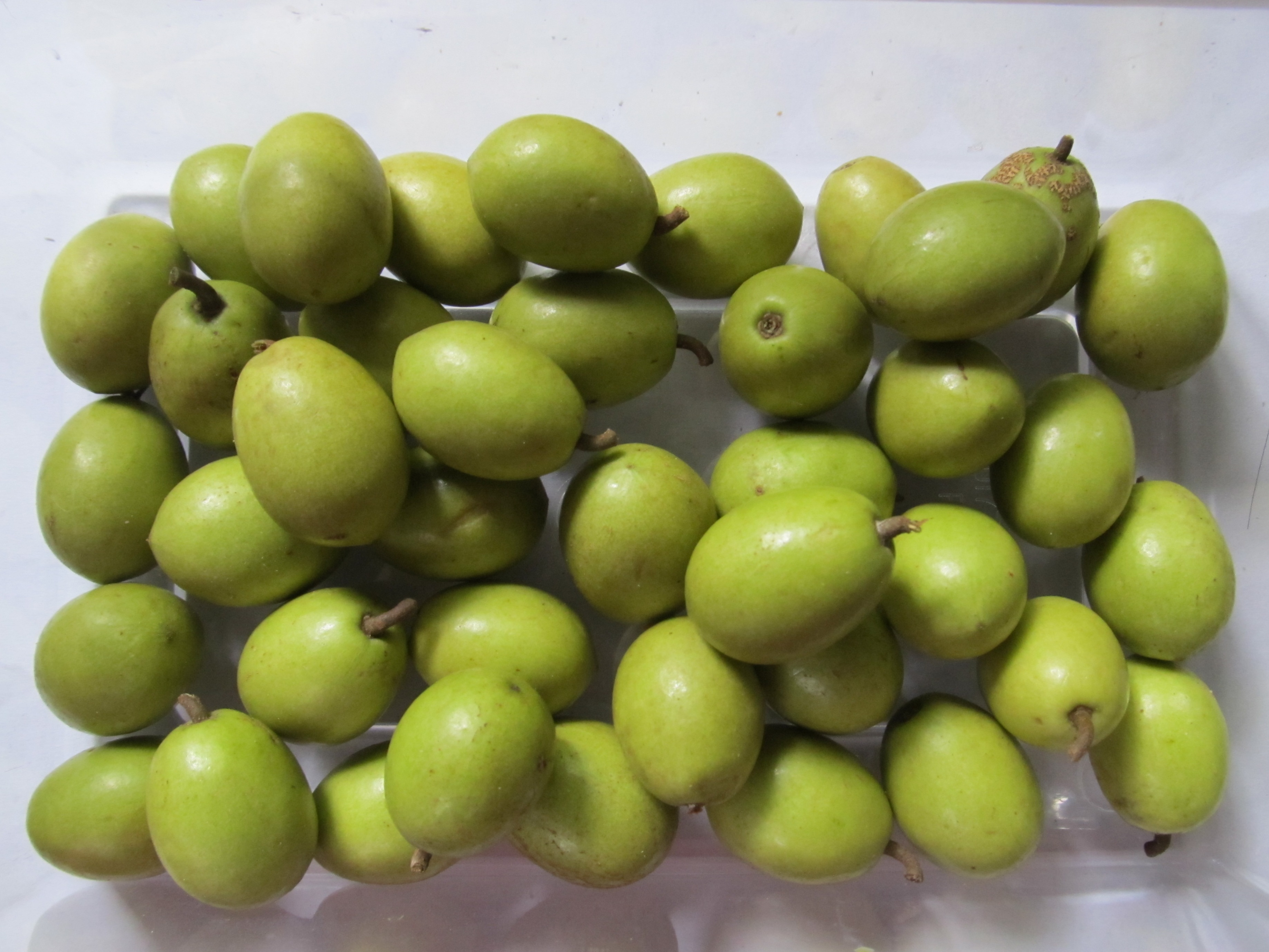
Fruits

Elaeocarpus serratus, the Ceylon olive, is a tropical flowering plant in the family Elaeocarpaceae. It is a medium to large tree, with white flowers. It has a disjunctive distribution, with the species occurring in Sri Lanka and southern India, and in Assam, Bangladesh and other parts in the north of the Indian subcontinent. The fruit is commonly eaten, and people also use the plant for ornamental, religious and folk-medicinal purposes. There are historical records of traditional-medicine use of the plant. Paradoxurus jerdoni (Brown palm civet) consumes parts of the tree.

== Variety ==
The species has an accepted variety, Elaeocarpus serratus var. weibelii.

== Description ==
The taxa is a medium to large evergreen tree with a large spreading crown, reaching 15–60 m (49–197 ft) in height. The flowers have pale-green petiole, 5 white to pale-olive-green calyxes, sepal 4–6 mm long, 5 white corollas, petals 4–5 mm long, slightly-black anther, 18-30 stamen. The flowers expand to maximum size in late afternoon and hence are likely adapted to night pollinators, i.e. moths. It bears smooth ovoid green fruits the size of which are about 2.5 cm (1.0 in) long. Recommended varieties are local cultivars (round and oval fruits). It has a brown seed inside the fruit. The seed has a hard outer shell. The seeds are slow for germination and can take up to 2 years. The wood is whitish yellow.

== Distribution ==
The species has a disjunctive distribution, it is native to an area of southern and southwest India and Sri Lanka, and to an area from Assam, northeast India, to Bangladesh. Countries and regions in which it is indigenous to are: Sri Lanka, India (Tamil Nadu, Karnataka, Kerala, Assam, Arunachal Pradesh), Bangladesh, Nepal. It has been introduced/naturalised to Réunion and Mauritius. It is also widely available in the villages of West Bengal. It is called 'Jalpai' and people eat it raw or make chutney, Jalpai ambal, or Achar.

The weibelii variety is native to Karnataka and Kerala in southwest India.

== Habitat and ecology ==
The tree is drought tolerant. Areas of high suitability for the plant in Assam include continuous patches of tropical and subtropical forest, and areas with a mosaic of fragmented groves, settled cultivation areas and human settlements. It grow less well in areas of degraded open forest, settled cultivation, homestead gardens and some human settlements. Areas of low suitability include grasslands, degraded open forest and some human settlements.

It natively occurs in the Sinharaja Forest Reserve, Sri Lanka, and is found in various protected areas of Assam, including Nameri National Park, Dibru-Saikhowa National Park, Pakke Tiger Reserve and Hoollongapar Gibbon Sanctuary.

The palm civet Paradoxurus jerdoni (Brown palm civet) consumes parts of the plant.

The population in India is rapidly decreasing, partly due to over-exploitation of the plant (particularly for seeds), and partly due to habitat destruction. It is cited as vulnerable in Arunachal Pradesh and Assam.

== Vernacular names ==
- veralu (වෙරළු) (Sinhala)
- veralikkai (Tamil)
- kaarakka, kaara (Malayalam)
- belfoi(ꠛꠦꠟꠚꠁ) (Sylheti, Bangladesh)
- Jalpai/Jaitun: (जल्पाई/जैतुन) (Nepali language, Nepal)
- jalpai (জলপাই) (Bengali)
- okhi-siming (Karbi language, Assam)
- zolphai (জলফাই) (Assamese)
- chorphon (Meitei language, Manipur)
- rudraksh (India)
- bead tree (India)
- Ceylon-olive (English)

== Uses ==
The taxa is used as an ornamental plant and its fruit are eaten.

The fruit of the taxa is well known in Sri Lanka.

Use of the plant is recorded historically in India, the fruit was believed to ward off evil spirits and omens. In recent folk medicine, various parts of the plant have been used to treat a large variety of ailments.

People living in Mai Municipality, Ilam District, far-eastern Nepal, use the plant as part of folk medicine and in religion. Juice from the bark is drunk in treatment for jaundice, while a paste from the seed is eaten in belief of a treatment for pneumonia and ulcer.

The Karbi people of Karbi Anglong District, Assam, harvest both ripe and unripe fruit from August to October, the ripe fruit is made into a pickle, the taste of the fruit is sour.

The fruits are high in starch and sugar and have low amounts of protein and iron. It may help treat diarrhoea due to its constipating effect.

== History ==
The founder of modern biological nomenclature, the Swede Carl Linnaeus (1707–1778) named the species in 1753 in his work Species Plantarum. The weibelii variety was named by the taxonomist Sue Zmarzty (born 1959) in 2001, publishing the description in the Kew Bulletin, 56(2), page 437.

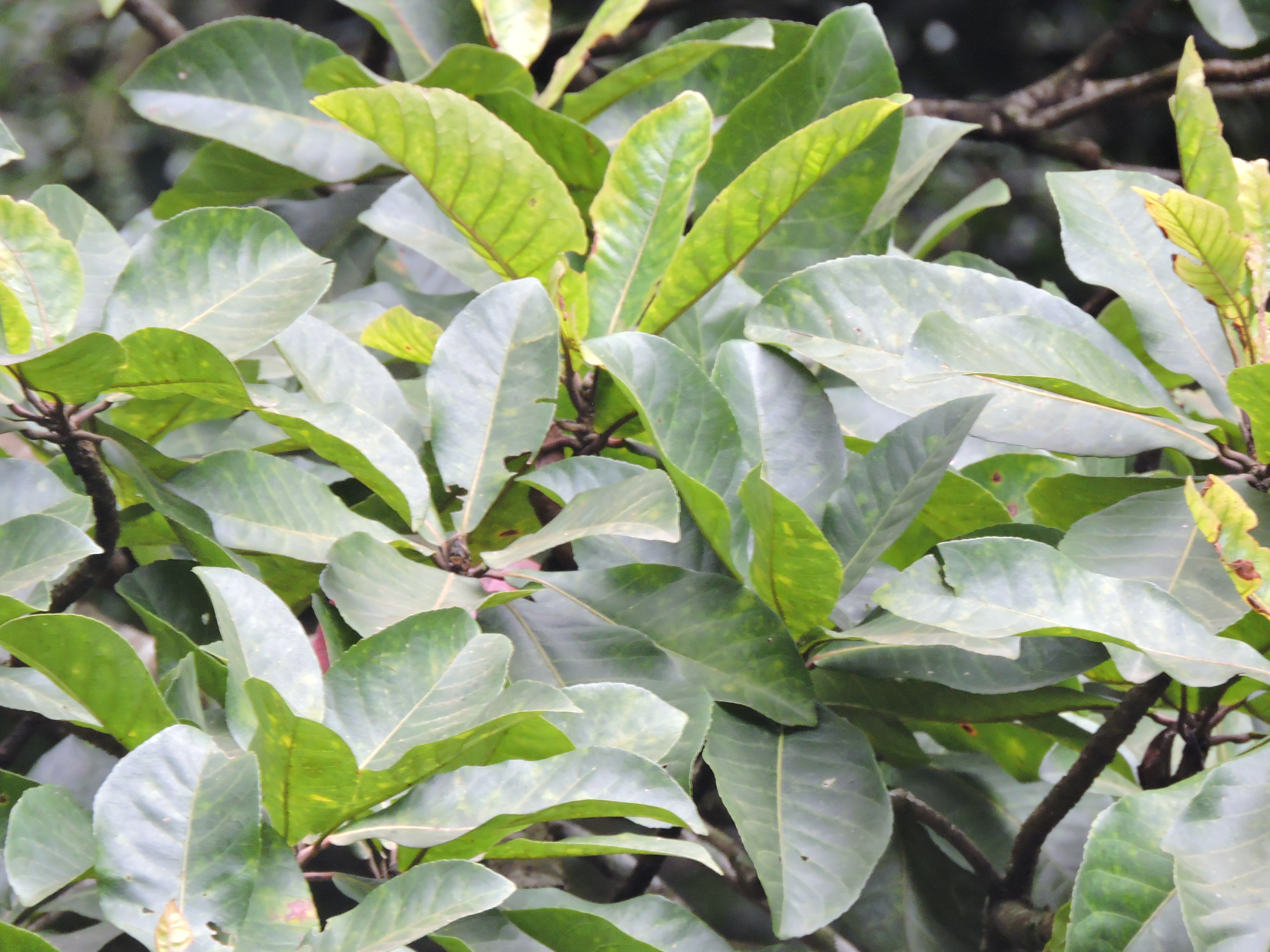
Leaves in canopy
