= List of Elaeocarpus species =

The following is an alphabetical listing of the 483 species in the genus Elaeocarpus that are accepted by Plants of the World Online as of September 2025. The Australian Plant Census additionally accepts E. michaelii.

== A ==
- Elaeocarpus achmadii Coode
- Elaeocarpus acmocarpus Stapf ex Weibel
- Elaeocarpus acmosepalus Stapf ex Ridl.
- Elaeocarpus acrantherus Merr.
- Elaeocarpus acronodia Mast.
- Elaeocarpus acuminatus Wall. ex Mast.
- Elaeocarpus adenopus Miq.
- Elaeocarpus affinis Merr.
- Elaeocarpus alanganorum Coode
- Elaeocarpus alaternoides Brongn. & Gris
- Elaeocarpus alnifolius Baker
- Elaeocarpus altigenus Schltr.
- Elaeocarpus altisectus Schltr.
- Elaeocarpus amabilis Kaneh. & Hatus.
- Elaeocarpus amboinensis Merr.
- Elaeocarpus amoenus Thwaites
- Elaeocarpus ampliflorus A.C.Sm.
- Elaeocarpus amplifolius Schltr.
- Elaeocarpus angustifolius Blume
- Elaeocarpus angustipes R.Knuth
- Elaeocarpus apoensis Elmer
- Elaeocarpus argenteus Merr.
- Elaeocarpus aristatus Roxb.
- Elaeocarpus arnhemicus F.Muell.
- Elaeocarpus atropunctatus Hung T.Chang
- Elaeocarpus auricomus C.Y.Wu ex Hung T.Chang
- Elaeocarpus austroyunnanensis Hu
- Elaeocarpus avium Coode

== B ==
- Elaeocarpus bachmaensis Gagnep.
- Elaeocarpus badius Coode
- Elaeocarpus bakaianus Coode
- Elaeocarpus balabanii Weibel
- Elaeocarpus balansae DC.
- Elaeocarpus balgooyi Coode
- Elaeocarpus bancroftii F.Muell. & F.M.Bailey
- Elaeocarpus baramii Weibel
- Elaeocarpus barbulatus R.Knuth
- Elaeocarpus bataanensis Merr.
- Elaeocarpus batjanicus Warb. ex R.Knuth
- Elaeocarpus batudulangii Weibel
- Elaeocarpus batui Coode
- Elaeocarpus baudouinii Brongn. & Gris
- Elaeocarpus beccarii DC.
- Elaeocarpus bellus R.Knuth
- Elaeocarpus bidupensis Gagnep.
- Elaeocarpus bifidus Hook. & Arn.
- Elaeocarpus biflorus Tirel
- Elaeocarpus bilobatus Schltr.
- Elaeocarpus bilongvinas Coode
- Elaeocarpus blascoi Weibel
- Elaeocarpus blepharoceras Schltr.
- Elaeocarpus bojeri R.E.Vaughan
- Elaeocarpus bokorensis Tagane
- Elaeocarpus bonii Gagnep.
- Elaeocarpus bontocensis Merr.
- Elaeocarpus braceanus G.Watt ex C.B.Clarke
- Elaeocarpus brachypodus Guillaumin
- Elaeocarpus brachystachyus Hung T.Chang
- Elaeocarpus bracteatus Kurz
- Elaeocarpus branderhorstii Pulle
- Elaeocarpus brigittae Coode
- Elaeocarpus brunneotomentosus Weibel
- Elaeocarpus brunnescens R.Knuth
- Elaeocarpus buderi Coode
- Elaeocarpus bullatus Tirel
- Elaeocarpus burebidensis Elmer
- Elaeocarpus burkii Coode

== C ==
- Elaeocarpus calomala (Blanco) Merr.
- Elaeocarpus candollei Elmer
- Elaeocarpus capuronii Tirel
- Elaeocarpus carbinensis J.N.Gagul & Crayn
- Elaeocarpus carolinae B.Hyland & Coode
- Elaeocarpus carolinensis Koidz.
- Elaeocarpus cassinoides A.Gray
- Elaeocarpus castaneifolius Guillaumin
- Elaeocarpus celebesianus Baker f.
- Elaeocarpus celebicus Koord.
- Elaeocarpus ceylanicus (Arn.) Mast.
- Elaeocarpus cheirophorus Schltr.
- Elaeocarpus chelonimorphus Gillespie
- Elaeocarpus chewii Coode
- Elaeocarpus chinensis (Gardner & Champ.) Hook.f. ex Benth.
- Elaeocarpus chionanthus A.C.Sm.
- Elaeocarpus chrysophyllus Merr.
- Elaeocarpus clementis Merr.
- Elaeocarpus clethroides Schltr.
- Elaeocarpus coactilus Gagnep.
- Elaeocarpus colnettianus Guillaumin
- Elaeocarpus coloides Schltr.
- Elaeocarpus compactus Schltr.
- Elaeocarpus comptonii Baker f.
- Elaeocarpus conoideus R.Knuth
- Elaeocarpus coodei Weibel
- Elaeocarpus coorangooloo J.F.Bailey & C.T.White
- Elaeocarpus corallococcus Tirel
- Elaeocarpus cordifolius Coode
- Elaeocarpus coriaceus Hook.
- Elaeocarpus corneri Weibel
- Elaeocarpus corsonianus G.Don
- Elaeocarpus costatus M.Taylor
- Elaeocarpus coumbouiensis Guillaumin
- Elaeocarpus crassinervatus R.Knuth
- Elaeocarpus crassus Coode
- Elaeocarpus crenulatus R.Knuth
- Elaeocarpus cristatus Coode
- Elaeocarpus cruciatus Corner
- Elaeocarpus cuernosensis Elmer
- Elaeocarpus culminicola Warb.
- Elaeocarpus cumingii Turcz.
- Elaeocarpus cupreus Merr.
- Elaeocarpus curranii Merr.

== D ==
- Elaeocarpus dallmannensis Kaneh. & Hatus.
- Elaeocarpus darlacensis Gagnep.
- Elaeocarpus dasycarpus A.C.Sm.
- Elaeocarpus davisii Coode
- Elaeocarpus debruynii O.C.Schmidt
- Elaeocarpus decandrus Merr.
- Elaeocarpus decipiens F.B.Forbes & Hemsl.
- Elaeocarpus degenerianus A.C.Sm.
- Elaeocarpus densiflorus R.Knuth
- Elaeocarpus dentatus (J.R.Forst. & G.Forst.) Vahl
- Elaeocarpus dewildei Weibel
- Elaeocarpus dianxiensis Y.Tang & H.Li
- Elaeocarpus dictyophlebius Merr.
- Elaeocarpus dinagatensis Merr.
- Elaeocarpus dognyensis Guillaumin
- Elaeocarpus dolichobotrys Merr.
- Elaeocarpus dolichodactylus Schltr.
- Elaeocarpus dolichostylus Schltr.
- Elaeocarpus dubius DC.
- Elaeocarpus duclouxii Gagnep.

== E ==
- Elaeocarpus elaeagnoides Gilli
- Elaeocarpus elatus A.C.Sm.
- Elaeocarpus elliffii B.Hyland & Coode
- Elaeocarpus elmeri DC.
- Elaeocarpus erdinii Coode
- Elaeocarpus eriobotryoides Ridl.
- Elaeocarpus eumundi F.M.Bailey
- Elaeocarpus euneurus Stapf ex Ridl.
- Elaeocarpus eymae Coode

== F ==
- Elaeocarpus fairchildii Merr.
- Elaeocarpus ferrugineus (Jack) Steud.
- Elaeocarpus ferruginiflorus C.T.White
- Elaeocarpus filiformidentatus R.Knuth
- Elaeocarpus finisterrae Schltr.
- Elaeocarpus firdausii Brambach, Coode, Biagioni & Culmsee
- Elaeocarpus firmus R.Knuth
- Elaeocarpus flavescens Schltr.
- Elaeocarpus fleuryi A.Chev. ex Gagnep.
- Elaeocarpus floresii Weibel
- Elaeocarpus floribundus Blume
- Elaeocarpus floridanus Hemsl.
- Elaeocarpus forbesii Merr.
- Elaeocarpus foveolatus F.Muell.
- Elaeocarpus foxworthyi Merr.
- Elaeocarpus fraseri Coode
- Elaeocarpus fruticosus Roxb.
- Elaeocarpus fulgens A.C.Sm.
- Elaeocarpus fulvus Elmer
- Elaeocarpus fuscoides R.Knuth
- Elaeocarpus fuscus Schltr.

== G ==
- Elaeocarpus gadgilii A.M.Maya, V.Suresh & K.M.P.Kumar
- Elaeocarpus gagnepainii Merr.
- Elaeocarpus gambutanus Coode
- Elaeocarpus gammillii R.Knuth
- Elaeocarpus gaoligongshanensis Y.Tang & Z.L.Dao
- Elaeocarpus gardneri Coode
- Elaeocarpus gaussenii Weibel
- Elaeocarpus geminiflorus Brongn. & Gris
- Elaeocarpus gigantifolius Elmer
- Elaeocarpus gillespieanus A.C.Sm.
- Elaeocarpus gitingensis Elmer
- Elaeocarpus glaber Blume
- Elaeocarpus glaberrimus R.Knuth
- Elaeocarpus glabripetalus Merr.
- Elaeocarpus glandulifer (Hook. ex Wight) Mast.
- Elaeocarpus glandulosus Wall. ex Merr.
- Elaeocarpus gordonii Tirel
- Elaeocarpus graeffei Seem.
- Elaeocarpus grahamii F.Muell.
- Elaeocarpus grandiflorus Sm.
- Elaeocarpus grandifolius Kurz
- Elaeocarpus grandis F.Muell.
- Elaeocarpus griffithii (Wight) A.Gray
- Elaeocarpus griseopuberulus Merr.
- Elaeocarpus grumosus Gagnep.
- Elaeocarpus guillaumii Vieill.
- Elaeocarpus gummatus Guillaumin
- Elaeocarpus gustaviifolius R.Knuth
- Elaeocarpus gymnogynus Hung T.Chang

== H ==
- Elaeocarpus habbemensis A.C.Sm.
- Elaeocarpus hainanensis Oliv.
- Elaeocarpus halconensis Merr.
- Elaeocarpus hallieri Weibel
- Elaeocarpus harmandii Pierre
- Elaeocarpus hartleyi Weibel
- Elaeocarpus harunii Coode
- Elaeocarpus hayatae Kaneh. & Sasaki
- Elaeocarpus hebecarpus Kaneh. & Hatus.
- Elaeocarpus hedyosmus Zmarzty
- Elaeocarpus heptadactyloides Weibel
- Elaeocarpus hildebrandtii Baill.
- Elaeocarpus hochreutineri Weibel
- Elaeocarpus holopetalus F.Muell.
- Elaeocarpus homalioides Schltr.
- Elaeocarpus hookerianus Raoul
- Elaeocarpus hortensis Guillaumin
- Elaeocarpus howii Merr. & Chun
- Elaeocarpus hygrophilus Kurz
- Elaeocarpus hylobroma Y.Baba & Crayn
- Elaeocarpus hypadenus Miq.

== I ==
- Elaeocarpus ilocanus Merr.
- Elaeocarpus indochinensis Merr.
- Elaeocarpus inopinatus Coode
- Elaeocarpus inopportunus Coode
- Elaeocarpus insignis Ridl.
- Elaeocarpus integrifolius Lam.
- Elaeocarpus integripetalus Miq.
- Elaeocarpus isotrichus (Turcz.) Fern.-Vill.

== J ==
- Elaeocarpus jacobsii Coode
- Elaeocarpus japonicus Siebold & Zucc.
- Elaeocarpus joga Merr.
- Elaeocarpus johnsii Coode
- Elaeocarpus johnsonii F.Muell. ex C.T.White
- Elaeocarpus jugahanus Coode

== K ==
- Elaeocarpus kaalensis Däniker
- Elaeocarpus kajewskii Guillaumin
- Elaeocarpus kalabitii Weibel
- Elaeocarpus kambi Gibbs
- Elaeocarpus kaniensis Schltr.
- Elaeocarpus kasiensis A.C.Sm.
- Elaeocarpus kerstingianus Schltr.
- Elaeocarpus kinabaluensis R.Knuth
- Elaeocarpus kirtonii F.Muell. ex F.M.Bailey
- Elaeocarpus kjellbergii Coode
- Elaeocarpus knuthii Merr.
- Elaeocarpus kontumensis Gagnep.
- Elaeocarpus kostermansii Weibel
- Elaeocarpus kraengensis R.Knuth
- Elaeocarpus kunstleri King
- Elaeocarpus kusaiensis Kaneh.
- Elaeocarpus kusanoi Koidz.

== L ==
- Elaeocarpus lacunosus Wall. ex Kurz
- Elaeocarpus lagunensis R.Knuth
- Elaeocarpus lanceifolius Roxb.
- Elaeocarpus lancipetalus Merr.
- Elaeocarpus lancistipulatus Coode
- Elaeocarpus lanipae Weibel
- Elaeocarpus laoticus Gagnep.
- Elaeocarpus largiflorens C.T.White
- Elaeocarpus latescens F.Muell.
- Elaeocarpus laurifolius A.Gray
- Elaeocarpus lawasii Weibel
- Elaeocarpus laxirameus Elmer
- Elaeocarpus ledermannii Schltr.
- Elaeocarpus leopoldii Weibel
- Elaeocarpus lepidus A.C.Sm.
- Elaeocarpus leratii Schltr.
- Elaeocarpus leucanthus A.C.Sm.
- Elaeocarpus leytensis Merr.
- Elaeocarpus limitaneoides Y.Tang
- Elaeocarpus limitaneus Hand.-Mazz.
- Elaeocarpus linearifolius R.Knuth
- Elaeocarpus lingualis R.Knuth
- Elaeocarpus linnaei Coode
- Elaeocarpus linsmithii Guymer
- Elaeocarpus longifolius Blume
- Elaeocarpus longlingensis Y.C.Hsu & Y.Tang
- Elaeocarpus lucidus Roxb.
- Elaeocarpus luteolignum Coode
- Elaeocarpus luteolus A.C.Sm.
- Elaeocarpus luzonicus Merr.

== M ==
- Elaeocarpus macdonaldii F.Muell.
- Elaeocarpus macranthus Merr.
- Elaeocarpus macrocarpus Miq.
- Elaeocarpus macrocerus (Turcz.) Merr.
- Elaeocarpus macrophyllus Blume
- Elaeocarpus macropus Warb. ex R.Knuth
- Elaeocarpus magnifolius Christoph.
- Elaeocarpus mahamayensis N.Silva, Yakand. & K.Yakand.
- Elaeocarpus mallotoides Schltr.
- Elaeocarpus mamasii Weibel
- Elaeocarpus mandiae Coode
- Elaeocarpus marafunganus Coode
- Elaeocarpus marginatus Stapf ex Weibel
- Elaeocarpus mastersii King
- Elaeocarpus medioglaber Gagnep.
- Elaeocarpus megacarpus Elmer
- Elaeocarpus melochioides A.C.Sm.
- Elaeocarpus merrittii Merr.
- Elaeocarpus michaelii C.T.White
- Elaeocarpus micranthus Teijsm. & Binn.
- Elaeocarpus miegei Weibel
- Elaeocarpus millarii Weibel
- Elaeocarpus milnei Seem.
- Elaeocarpus mindanaensis Merr.
- Elaeocarpus mindoroensis R.Knuth
- Elaeocarpus mingendensis Gilli
- Elaeocarpus miquelii Hochr.
- Elaeocarpus miriensis Weibel
- Elaeocarpus mollis Merr.
- Elaeocarpus monocera Cav.
- Elaeocarpus montanus Thwaites
- Elaeocarpus moratii Tirel
- Elaeocarpus multiflorus (Turcz.) Fern.-Vill.
- Elaeocarpus multinervosus R.Knuth
- Elaeocarpus multisectus Schltr.
- Elaeocarpus muluensis Weibel
- Elaeocarpus munroi (Wight) Mast.
- Elaeocarpus murudensis Merr.
- Elaeocarpus murukkai Coode
- Elaeocarpus musseri Coode
- Elaeocarpus mutabilis Weibel
- Elaeocarpus myrmecophilus A.C.Sm.
- Elaeocarpus myrtoides A.C.Sm.

== N ==
- Elaeocarpus nanus Corner
- Elaeocarpus neobritannicus Coode
- Elaeocarpus nervosus Elmer
- Elaeocarpus ngii Coode
- Elaeocarpus nitentifolius Merr. & Chun
- Elaeocarpus nitidulus R.Knuth
- Elaeocarpus nitidus Jack
- Elaeocarpus nodosus Baker f.
- Elaeocarpus nooteboomii Coode
- Elaeocarpus nouhuysii Koord.

== O ==
- Elaeocarpus oblongilimbus Hung T.Chang
- Elaeocarpus obovatus G.Don
- Elaeocarpus obtusus Blume
- Elaeocarpus occidentalis Tirel
- Elaeocarpus octantherus DC.
- Elaeocarpus octopetalus Merr.
- Elaeocarpus oriomensis Weibel
- Elaeocarpus ornatus Coode
- Elaeocarpus orohensis Schltr.
- Elaeocarpus osiae Coode
- Elaeocarpus ovalis Miq.
- Elaeocarpus ovigerus Brongn. & Gris

== P ==
- Elaeocarpus pachyanthus Schltr.
- Elaeocarpus pachydactylus Schltr.
- Elaeocarpus pachyophrys Warb.
- Elaeocarpus pagonensis Coode
- Elaeocarpus palembanicus (Miq.) Corner
- Elaeocarpus parviflorus Span.
- Elaeocarpus parvilimbus Merr.
- Elaeocarpus pedunculatus Wall. ex Mast.
- Elaeocarpus pentadactylus Schltr.
- Elaeocarpus perrieri Tirel
- Elaeocarpus persicifolius Brongn. & Gris
- Elaeocarpus petelotii Merr.
- Elaeocarpus petiolatus (Jack) Wall.
- Elaeocarpus philippinensis Warb.
- Elaeocarpus photiniifolius Hook. & Arn.
- Elaeocarpus pierrei Koord. & Valeton
- Elaeocarpus piestocarpus Schltr.
- Elaeocarpus pinosukii Weibel
- Elaeocarpus pittosporoides A.C.Sm.
- Elaeocarpus poculifer A.C.Sm.
- Elaeocarpus poilanei Gagnep.
- Elaeocarpus polyandrus A.C.Sm.
- Elaeocarpus polyanthus Ridl.
- Elaeocarpus polycarpus Stapf ex Ridl.
- Elaeocarpus polydactylus Schltr.
- Elaeocarpus polystachyus Wall. ex Müll.Berol.
- Elaeocarpus praeclarus A.C.Sm.
- Elaeocarpus prafiensis Weibel
- Elaeocarpus prunifolioides Hu
- Elaeocarpus prunifolius (Müll.Berol.) Wall. ex Mast.
- Elaeocarpus pseudopaniculatus Corner
- Elaeocarpus ptilanthus Schltr.
- Elaeocarpus pulchellus Brongn. & Gris
- Elaeocarpus pullenii Weibel
- Elaeocarpus punctatus Wall. ex Mast.
- Elaeocarpus purus Coode
- Elaeocarpus pycnanthus A.C.Sm.
- Elaeocarpus pyriformis A.Gray

== Q ==
- Elaeocarpus quadratus C.E.C.Fisch.

== R ==
- Elaeocarpus ramiflorus Merr.
- Elaeocarpus recurvatus Corner
- Elaeocarpus renae Coode
- Elaeocarpus retakensis Coode
- Elaeocarpus reticosus Ridl.
- Elaeocarpus reticulatus Sm.
- Elaeocarpus rivularis Gagnep.
- Elaeocarpus robustus Roxb.
- Elaeocarpus roseiflorus A.C.Sm.
- Elaeocarpus roslii Coode
- Elaeocarpus rosselensis Coode
- Elaeocarpus rotundifolius Brongn. & Gris
- Elaeocarpus royenii Weibel
- Elaeocarpus rubescens Weibel
- Elaeocarpus rubidus Kaneh.
- Elaeocarpus rufovestitus Baker
- Elaeocarpus rugosus Roxb. ex G.Don
- Elaeocarpus ruminatus F.Muell.
- Elaeocarpus rumphii Merr.
- Elaeocarpus rutengii Weibel

== S ==
- Elaeocarpus sadikanensis R.Knuth
- Elaeocarpus salicifolius King
- Elaeocarpus sallehianus Ng
- Elaeocarpus samari Weibel
- Elaeocarpus sarcanthus Schltr.
- Elaeocarpus sayeri F.Muell.
- Elaeocarpus schlechterianus A.C.Sm.
- Elaeocarpus schmutzii Weibel
- Elaeocarpus schoddei Weibel
- Elaeocarpus sebastianii Weibel
- Elaeocarpus sedentarius Maynard & Crayn
- Elaeocarpus sepikanus Schltr.
- Elaeocarpus seramicus Coode
- Elaeocarpus sericoloides A.C.Sm.
- Elaeocarpus sericopetalus F.Muell.
- Elaeocarpus seringii Montrouz.
- Elaeocarpus serratus L.
- Elaeocarpus sikkimensis Mast.
- Elaeocarpus simaluensis Weibel
- Elaeocarpus simplex Kurz
- Elaeocarpus spathulatus Brongn. & Gris
- Elaeocarpus speciosus Brongn. & Gris
- Elaeocarpus sphaericus (Gaertn.) Heer
- Elaeocarpus sphaerocarpus Hung T.Chang
- Elaeocarpus stapfianus Gagnep.
- Elaeocarpus stellaris L.S.Sm.
- Elaeocarpus sterrophyllus Schltr.
- Elaeocarpus steupii Coode
- Elaeocarpus stipularis Blume
- Elaeocarpus storckii Seem.
- Elaeocarpus subcapitatus Gillespie
- Elaeocarpus subisensis Coode
- Elaeocarpus sublucidus R.Knuth
- Elaeocarpus submonoceras Miq.
- Elaeocarpus subpetiolatus Hung T.Chang
- Elaeocarpus subpuberus Miq.
- Elaeocarpus subserratus Baker
- Elaeocarpus subvillosus Arn.
- Elaeocarpus surigaensis Merr.
- Elaeocarpus sylvestris (Lour.) Poir.
- Elaeocarpus symingtonii Ng

== T ==
- Elaeocarpus tahanensis M.R.Hend.
- Elaeocarpus takolensis Coode
- Elaeocarpus taprobanicus Zmarzty
- Elaeocarpus tariensis Weibel
- Elaeocarpus tectonifolius Ridl.
- Elaeocarpus tectorius (Lour.) Poir.
- Elaeocarpus terminalioides Schltr.
- Elaeocarpus teysmannii Koord. & Valeton
- Elaeocarpus thelmae B.Hyland & Coode
- Elaeocarpus thorelii Pierre
- Elaeocarpus timikensis Coode
- Elaeocarpus timorensis R.Knuth
- Elaeocarpus tjerengii Weibel
- Elaeocarpus toninensis Baker f.
- Elaeocarpus tonkinensis DC.
- Elaeocarpus tremulus Tirel & McPherson
- Elaeocarpus trichopetalus Merr. & Quisumb.
- Elaeocarpus trichophyllus A.C.Sm.
- Elaeocarpus triflorus Merr.
- Elaeocarpus truncatus Weibel
- Elaeocarpus tuasivicus Christoph.
- Elaeocarpus tuberculatus Roxb.

== U ==
- Elaeocarpus undulatus Warb.
- Elaeocarpus urophyllus Merr. & Quisumb.

== V ==
- Elaeocarpus vaccinioides F.Muell. ex Brongn. & Gris
- Elaeocarpus valetonii Hochr.
- Elaeocarpus validus R.Knuth
- Elaeocarpus variabilis Zmarzty
- Elaeocarpus varunua Buch.-Ham. ex Mast.
- Elaeocarpus venosus C.B.Rob.
- Elaeocarpus venustus Bedd.
- Elaeocarpus verheijenii Weibel
- Elaeocarpus verruculosus DC.
- Elaeocarpus versicolor Elmer
- Elaeocarpus verticillatus Elmer
- Elaeocarpus vieillardii Brongn. & Gris
- Elaeocarpus viguieri Gagnep.
- Elaeocarpus vitiensis Gillespie

== W ==
- Elaeocarpus weibelianus Tirel
- Elaeocarpus weibelii (Zmarzty) Shareef, S.P.Mathew & Shaju
- Elaeocarpus whartonensis A.C.Sm.
- Elaeocarpus williamsianus Guymer
- Elaeocarpus womersleyi Weibel
- Elaeocarpus wrayi King

== X ==
- Elaeocarpus xanthodactylus A.C.Sm.

== Y ==
- Elaeocarpus yateensis Guillaumin

== Z ==
- Elaeocarpus zambalensis Elmer
