= Quandong =

Quandong, quandang or quondong is a common name for the species Santalum acuminatum (desert, sweet, Western quandong), especially its edible fruit, but may also refer to:

- Aceratium concinnum (highroot quandong)
- Peripentadenia mearsii (buff, grey quandong)
- Elaeocarpus angustifolius (blue quandong)
- Elaeocarpus arnhemicus (Arnhem Land, bony quandong)
- Elaeocarpus bancroftii (Kuranda quandong)
- Elaeocarpus coorangooloo (brown quandong)
- Elaeocarpus eumundi (eumundi, smooth-leaved quandong)
- Elaeocarpus ferruginiflorus (rusty leaf quandong)
- Elaeocarpus foveolatus (white, Northern quandong)
- Elaeocarpus grandis (brush, blue, white quandong; quandong)
- Elaeocarpus holopetalus (mountain quandong)
- Elaeocarpus johnsonii (Kuranda quandong)
- Elaeocarpus kirtonii (brown-hearted quandong)
- Elaeocarpus kirtonii (white quandong)
- Elaeocarpus largiflorens (tropical quandong)
- Elaeocarpus obovatus (hard quandong)
- Elaeocarpus reticulatus (Ash quandong)
- Elaeocarpus ruminatus (brown, grey quandong)
- Elaeocarpus sericopetalus (Northern, hard, Northern hard quandong)
- Elaeocarpus williamsianus (hairy quandong)
- Santalum acuminatum (desert quandong)
- Santalum lanceolatum (desert quandong)
- Santalum murrayanum (bitter quandong)
- Terminalia cunninghamii (pindan quandong)
- The specific epithet of Amyema quandang, discovered growing on Santalum acuminatum
