= Caloon =

Caloon (also coolan or cooloon) may refer to certain species of Australian trees within the genus Elaeocarpus including:

- Elaeocarpus angustifolius
- Elaeocarpus coorangooloo
- Elaeocarpus ruminatus

== See also ==
- Cooloon (ship), Australian general cargo ship built in 1904
