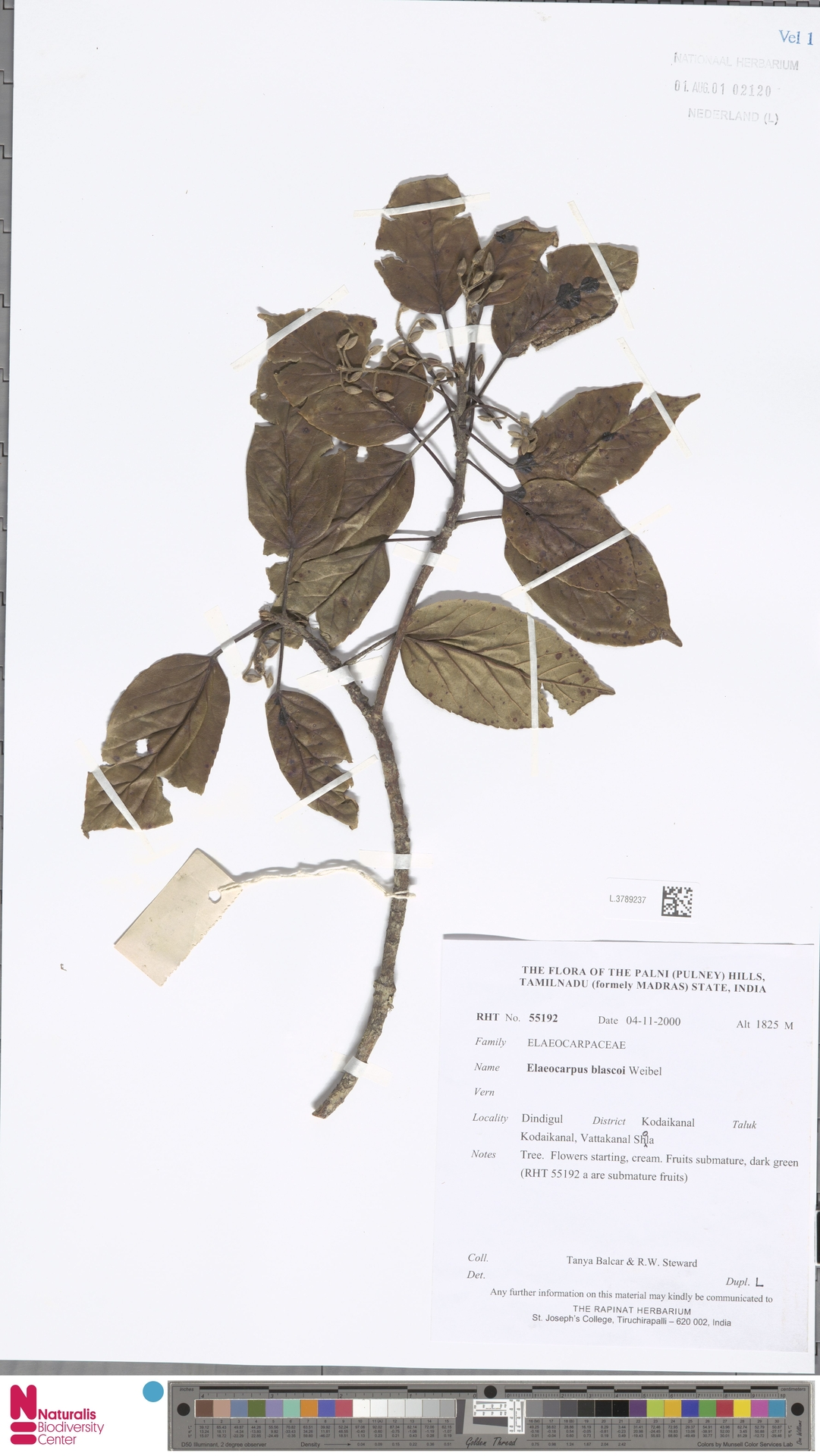

Conservation status
- Critically Endangered (IUCN 3.1)

Scientific classification
- Kingdom: Plantae
- Clade: Tracheophytes
- Clade: Angiosperms
- Clade: Eudicots
- Clade: Rosids
- Order: Oxalidales
- Family: Elaeocarpaceae
- Genus: Elaeocarpus
- Species: E. blascoi

Binomial name
- Elaeocarpus blascoi Weibel

= Elaeocarpus blascoi =

Species of flowering plant endemic to India

Elaeocarpus blascoi is a species of flowering plant in the Elaeocarpaceae family. It is endemic to the Western Ghats of southern India, where it is threatened by habitat loss and is Critically Endangered.

== Description ==
Elaeocarpus blascoi is a medium-sized, slow-growing evergreen tree. Young trees have dense foliage, while mature trees develop a buttressed trunk and spreading crown up to 20 metres (66 ft) high. The plants have a low fruit-set (50–78%), and many immature fruits drop prematurely. Mature fruits detach from their stalks in June and July. Seeds are stony and often dormant for 6 to 18 months. They have a low germination rate (5%) and most seeds lose their viability after a year.

== Range and habitat ==
This tree is known only from Vattakanal Shola in the Palani Hills, at Kodaikanal in the Western Ghats of Tamil Nadu state at 2,200 metres (7,200 ft) elevation. Only two mature wild specimens are known. One is a four-stemmed buttressed tree growing along a seasonal stream channel at the edge of the shola forest overlooking grassland. Associated trees include Elaeocarpus variabilis, Elaeocarpus recurvatus, Elaeocarpus munroi, Syzigium densiflorum, Gomphandra coriacea, and Lasianthus sp.

== Conservation ==
The species is threatened with habitat loss from logging and expansion of agriculture. No natural regeneration has been observed.

== See also ==
- List of Elaeocarpus species
