= Elaeocarpus michaelii =

Scientific classification
- Kingdom: Plantae
- Clade: Tracheophytes
- Clade: Angiosperms
- Clade: Eudicots
- Clade: Rosids
- Order: Oxalidales
- Family: Elaeocarpaceae
- Genus: Elaeocarpus
- Species: E. michaelii

Binomial name
- Elaeocarpus michaelii C.T.White

Synonyms
- Elaeocarpus longipetiolatus C.T.White nom. illeg.

Species of flowering plant endemic to Australia

Elaeocarpus michaelii is species of flowering plant in the family Elaeocarpaceae and is endemic to Queensland. It was first given the name Elaeocarpus longipetiolatus in 1919 by Cyril Tenison White in The Botany Bulletin of the Queensland Department of Agriculture, but the name was illegitimate. In 1933, White changed the name to Elaeocarpus michaelii in the Bulletin of Miscellaneous Information, Royal Gardens, Kew. The specific epithet honours the Reverend Norman Michael who collected the type specimens. Plants of the World Online regards the name E. michaelii as a synonym of E. culminicola.

Elaeocarpus michaelii is endemic to Queensland.

This quandong is listed as of "least concern" under the Queensland Government Nature Conservation Act 1992.
