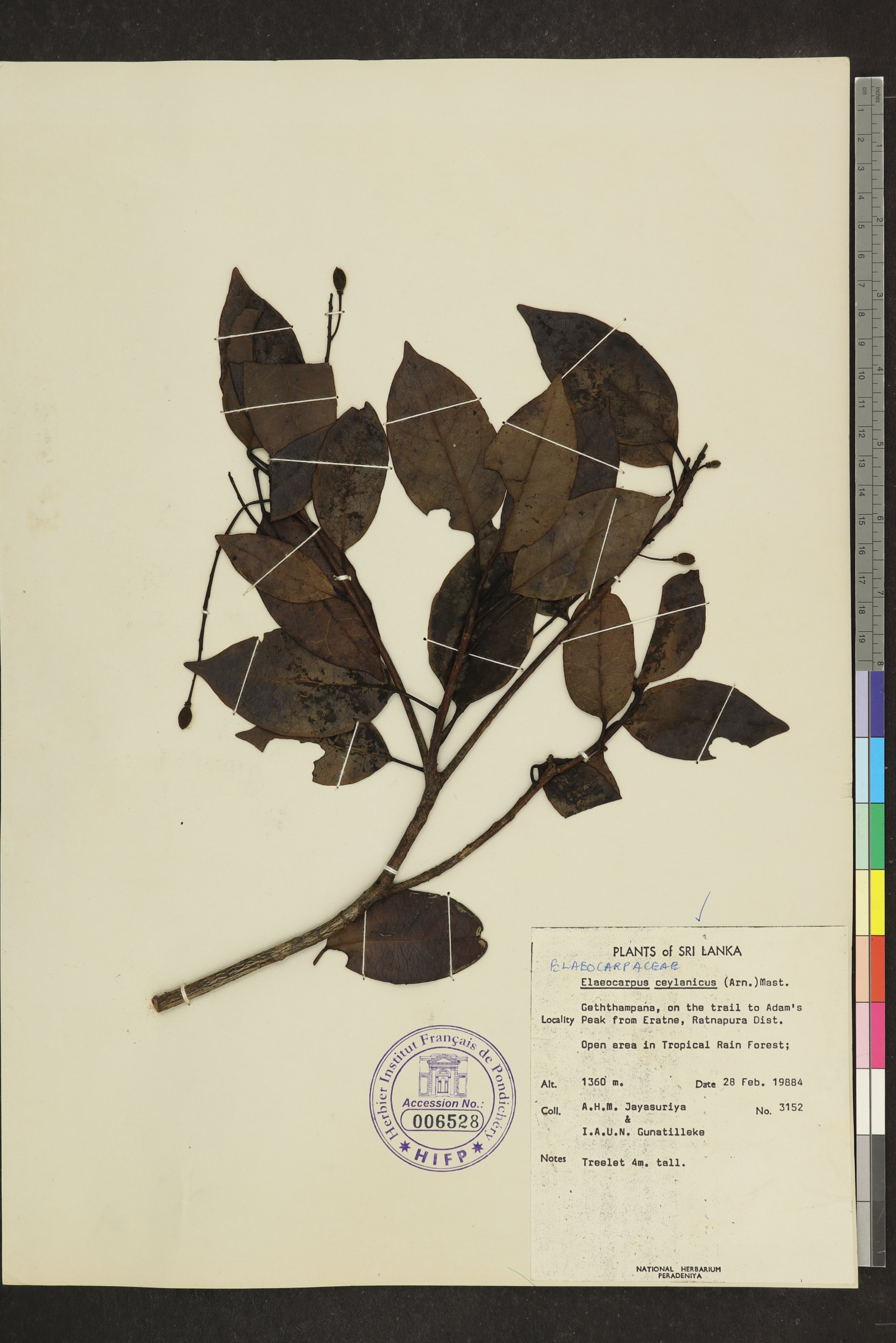

Conservation status
- Endangered (IUCN 2.3)

Scientific classification
- Kingdom: Plantae
- Clade: Tracheophytes
- Clade: Angiosperms
- Clade: Eudicots
- Clade: Rosids
- Order: Oxalidales
- Family: Elaeocarpaceae
- Genus: Elaeocarpus
- Species: E. ceylanicus

Binomial name
- Elaeocarpus ceylanicus (Arn.) Mast.

Synonyms
- Monocera ceylanica Arn.; Monocera walkeri Wight

= Elaeocarpus ceylanicus =

Species of flowering plant endemic to Sri Lanka

Elaeocarpus ceylanicus is a species of flowering plant in the Elaeocarpaceae family. It is a shrub or tree found only in Sri Lanka.

== See also ==
- List of Elaeocarpus species
