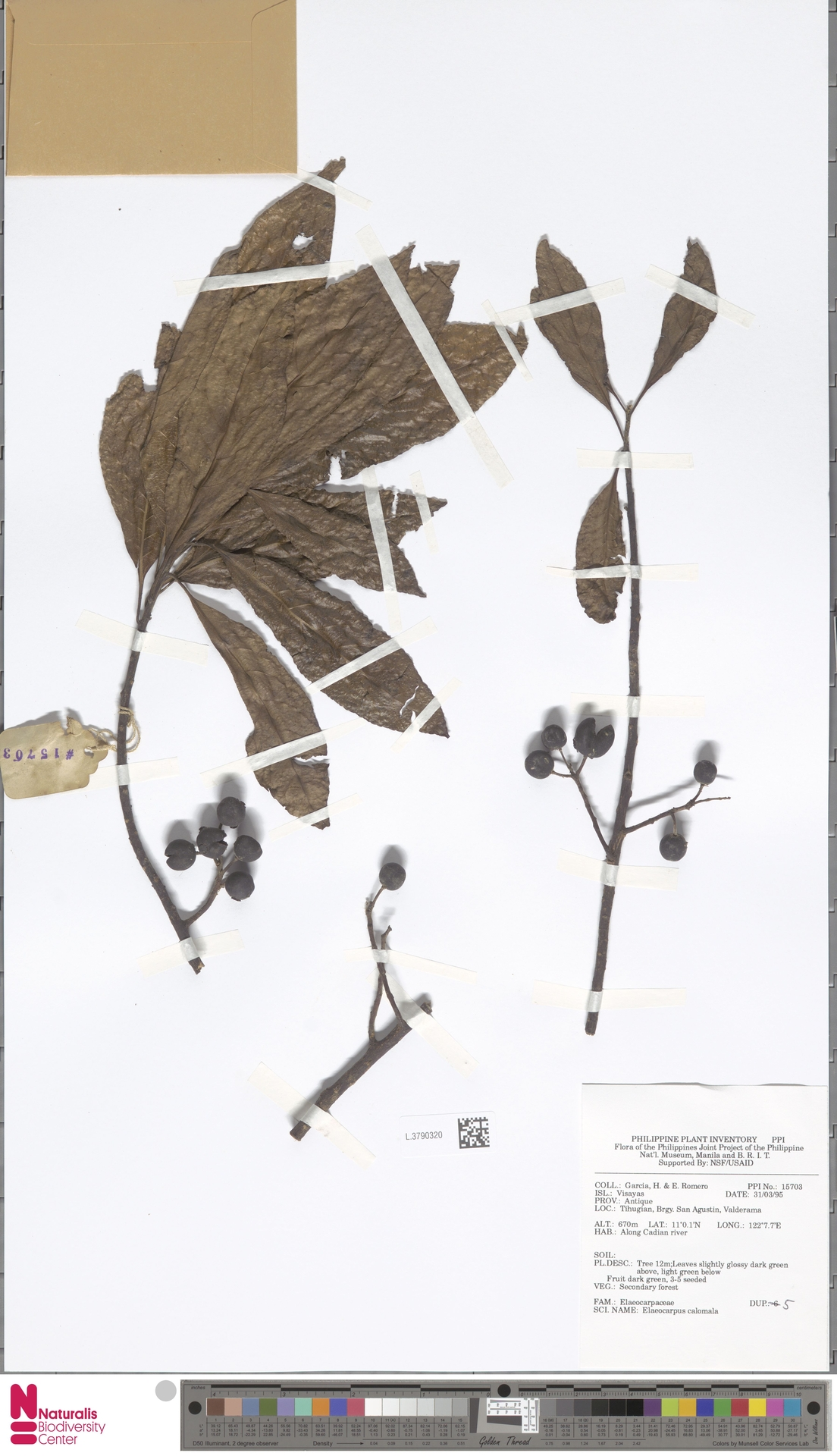

Scientific classification
- Kingdom: Plantae
- Clade: Tracheophytes
- Clade: Angiosperms
- Clade: Eudicots
- Clade: Rosids
- Order: Oxalidales
- Family: Elaeocarpaceae
- Genus: Elaeocarpus
- Species: E. calomala

Binomial name
- Elaeocarpus calomala (Blanco) Merr.

= Elaeocarpus calomala =

Species of flowering plant found in the Philippines

Elaeocarpus calomala is a species of flowering plant in the family Elaeocarpaceae.

Elaeocarpus calomala is a tree commonly found in the Philippines and used to create religious images known as santo. In the Philippines this tree is locally known as anakle, bunsilak or binting-dalaga (Tagalog, "maiden's leg"). It is similar to native tree species known as batikuling and like the olongas, another native tree species in the Philippines.

== See also ==
- List of Elaeocarpus species
