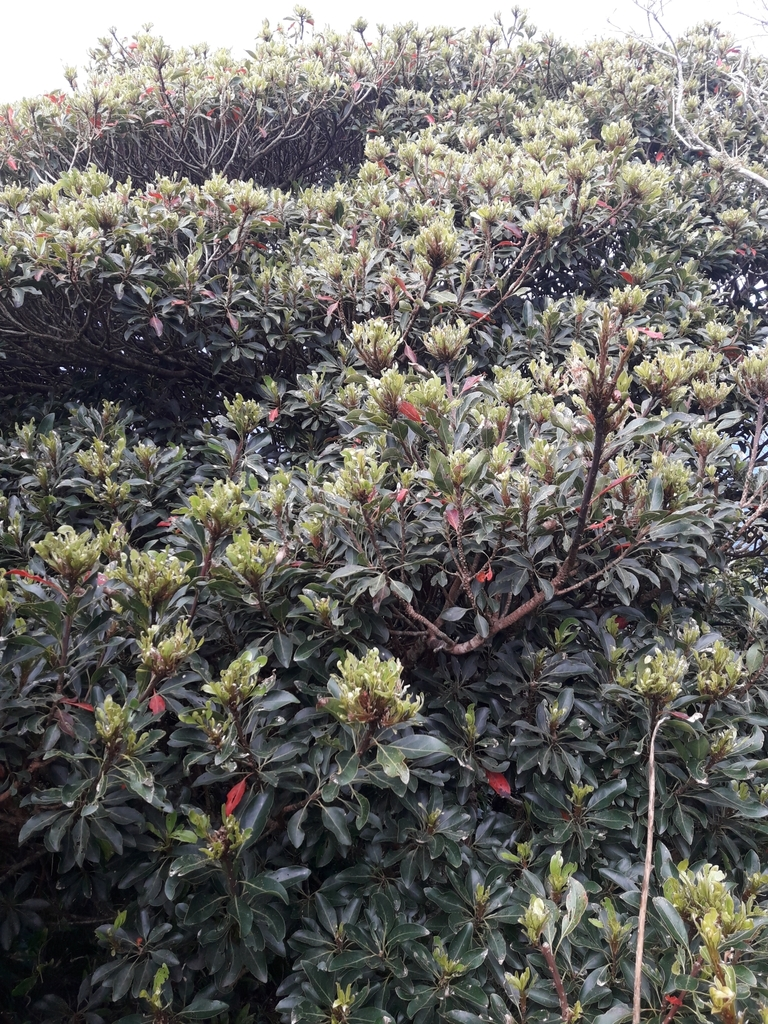
- Wild specimen from Lord Howe Island

Scientific classification
- Kingdom: Plantae
- Clade: Tracheophytes
- Clade: Angiosperms
- Clade: Eudicots
- Clade: Rosids
- Order: Oxalidales
- Family: Elaeocarpaceae
- Genus: Elaeocarpus
- Species: E. costatus

Binomial name
- Elaeocarpus costatus M.Taylor

= Elaeocarpus costatus =

Species of flowering plant endemic to Lord Howe Island

Elaeocarpus costatus is a species of flowering plant in the family Elaeocarpaceae that is endemic to Lord Howe Island. It is a tree with lance-shaped to elliptic leaves with wavy-toothed edges, flowers in groups of eight to ten, and blue fruit.

== Description ==
Elaeocarpus costatus is a tree that typically grows to a height of about 8 m (26 ft). Its leaves are arranged alternately, lance-shaped to elliptic, 60–90 mm (2.4–3.5 in) long and 25–30 mm (0.98–1.18 in) wide on a petiole 10–15 mm (0.39–0.59 in) long. The edges of the leaves have wavy teeth, but the teeth are pointed when young. The leaves turn bright red before falling. The flowers are pendent, in groups of between eight and ten in leaf axils, the groups about 30 mm (1.2 in) long. Each flower has five narrow lance-shaped sepals 5–6 mm (0.20–0.24 in) long and five petals about 8 mm (0.31 in) long with a frilled tip. The many stamens are 4–5 mm (0.16–0.20 in) long. Flowering occurs from mid-February to March and the fruit is a blue, oval drupe about 20 mm (0.79 in) long.

== Taxonomy ==
Elaeocarpus costatus was first formally described in 1939 by Mary Ruth Fussel Jackson Taylor in the Bulletin of Miscellaneous Information, Royal Gardens, Kew from specimens collected by James Doran McComish. The specific epithet (costatus) means "ribbed", referring to the ribs on the endocarp of the fruit.

The species was illustrated in 1902 by Joseph Maiden in the Proceedings of the Linnean Society of New South Wales with a diagram of a leaf and fruit.

== Distribution and habitat ==
This species is endemic to Lord Howe Island, where it is rare. It is found on the southern end of the island, usually in the mountains, including in cloud forest, but occasionally also in the lowlands.

== See also ==
- List of Elaeocarpus species
