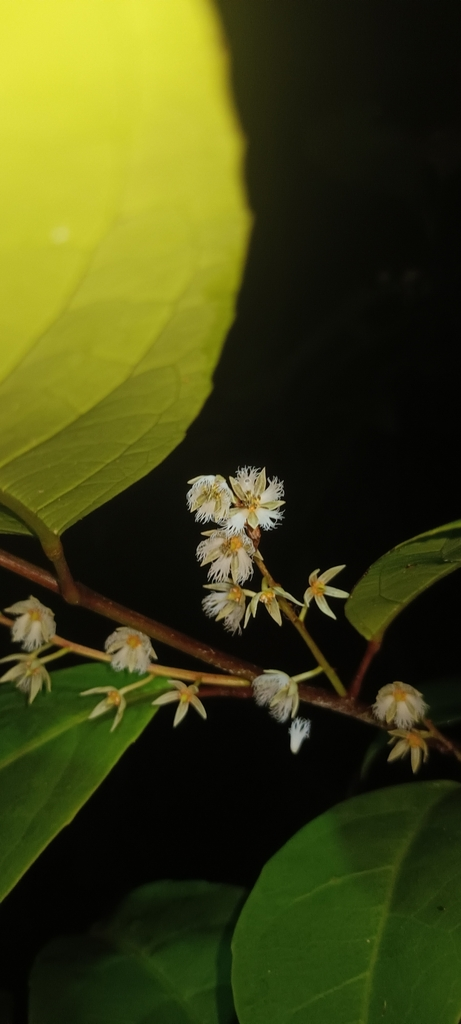

Conservation status
- Data Deficient (IUCN 3.1)

Scientific classification
- Kingdom: Plantae
- Clade: Tracheophytes
- Clade: Angiosperms
- Clade: Eudicots
- Clade: Rosids
- Order: Oxalidales
- Family: Elaeocarpaceae
- Genus: Elaeocarpus
- Species: E. acmosepalus

Binomial name
- Elaeocarpus acmosepalus Stapf ex Ridl.

= Elaeocarpus acmosepalus =

Species of flowering plant

Elaeocarpus acmosepalus is a species of flowering plant in the Elaeocarpaceae family. It is a tree found in Peninsular Malaysia and Singapore. It is threatened by habitat loss.

== See also ==
- List of Elaeocarpus species
