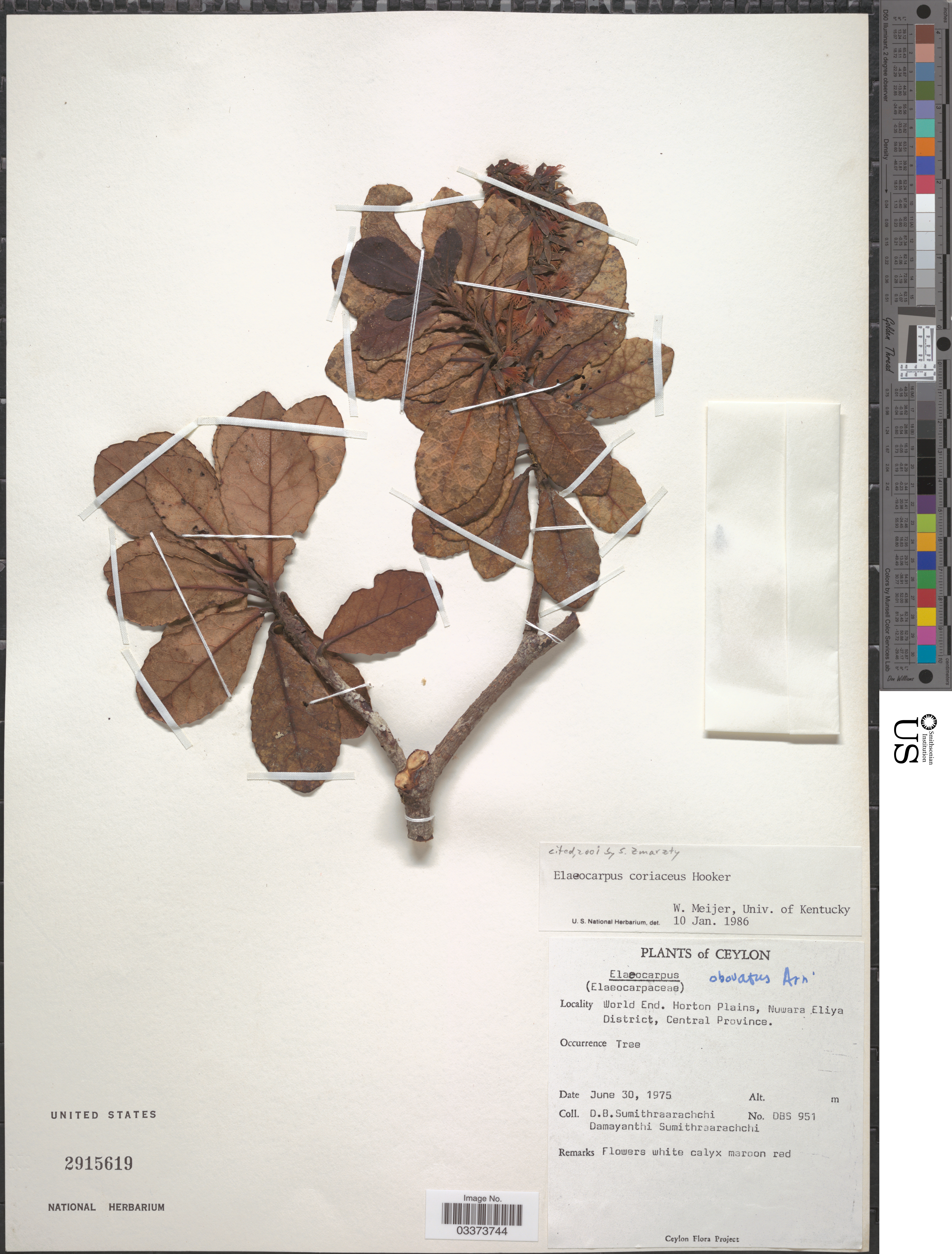

Conservation status
- Endangered (IUCN 2.3)

Scientific classification
- Kingdom: Plantae
- Clade: Tracheophytes
- Clade: Angiosperms
- Clade: Eudicots
- Clade: Rosids
- Order: Oxalidales
- Family: Elaeocarpaceae
- Genus: Elaeocarpus
- Species: E. coriaceus

Binomial name
- Elaeocarpus coriaceus Hook.

= Elaeocarpus coriaceus =

Species of flowering plant endemic to Sri Lanka

Elaeocarpus coriaceus is a species of flowering plant in the Elaeocarpaceae family. It is found only in Sri Lanka.

== See also ==
- List of Elaeocarpus species
