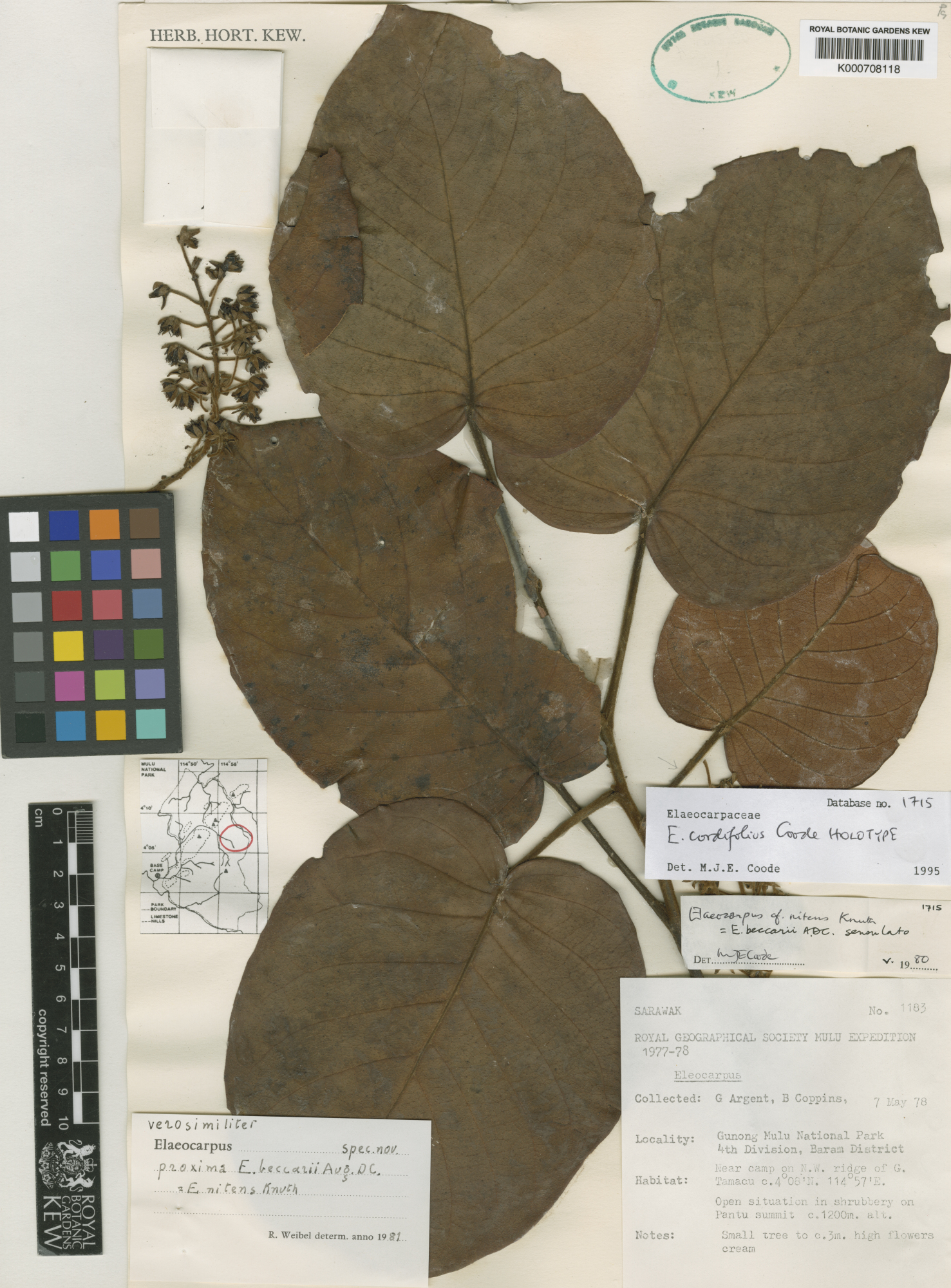

Conservation status
- Conservation Dependent (IUCN 2.3)

Scientific classification
- Kingdom: Plantae
- Clade: Tracheophytes
- Clade: Angiosperms
- Clade: Eudicots
- Clade: Rosids
- Order: Oxalidales
- Family: Elaeocarpaceae
- Genus: Elaeocarpus
- Species: E. cordifolius

Binomial name
- Elaeocarpus cordifolius Coode

= Elaeocarpus cordifolius =

Species of flowering plant endemic to Borneo

Elaeocarpus cordifolius is a species of tree in the plant family Elaeocarpaceae.

It is endemic to Borneo. It is known only from Gunung Mulu National Park in Sarawak and one location in Kalimantan, Indonesia.

== See also ==
- List of Elaeocarpus species
