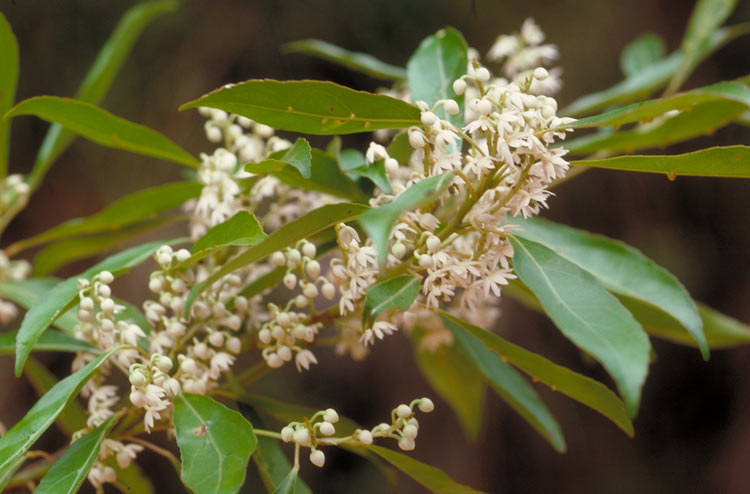

Scientific classification
- Kingdom: Plantae
- Clade: Tracheophytes
- Clade: Angiosperms
- Clade: Eudicots
- Clade: Rosids
- Order: Oxalidales
- Family: Elaeocarpaceae
- Genus: Elaeocarpus
- Species: E. elliffii

Binomial name
- Elaeocarpus elliffii B.Hyland & Coode

= Elaeocarpus elliffii =

Mountain quandong

Species of tree endemic to Queensland

Elaeocarpus elliffii, commonly known as mountain quandong, is a species of flowering plant in the family Elaeocarpaceae and is endemic to north-east Queensland. It is a tree, sometimes with buttress roots at the base of the trunk, narrow egg-shaped leaves often with large domatia, flowers with five white petals with lobed tips, and more or less spherical fruit.

== Description ==
Elaeocarpus elliffii is a tree that typically grows to a height of 20–40 m (66–131 ft), often with buttress roots at the base of the trunk. The leaves are narrow egg-shaped with the narrower end towards the base, 60–90 mm (2.4–3.5 in) long and 15–25 mm (0.59–0.98 in) wide on a slender petiole 10–17 mm (0.39–0.67 in) long. The leaves usually develop up to five large domatia and have wavy-toothed edges. The flowers are borne in groups of up to twelve on a rachis up to 40 mm (1.6 in) long, each flower on a pedicel 4–6 mm (0.16–0.24 in) long. The flowers have five egg-shaped sepals 4–5 mm (0.16–0.20 in) long and 1.5–2 mm (0.059–0.079 in) wide. The five petals are white, elliptic to oblong, 4.5–5 mm (0.18–0.20 in) long and 1.2–2 mm (0.047–0.079 in) wide with six to nine irregular short teeth on the tip, and there are thirty to thirty-five stamens. Flowering occurs from October to September and the fruit is a more or less spherical or oval drupe 12–14 mm (0.47–0.55 in) long and 10–11 mm (0.39–0.43 in) wide, present from July to October.

== Taxonomy ==
Elaeocarpus elliffii was first formally described in 1984 by Bernard Hyland and Mark James Elgar Coode in the Kew Bulletin from material collected in 1970. The specific epithet (elleffii) honours Maurice Elliff (1921–1981), an employee of the herbarium at the Royal Botanic Gardens, Kew from 1977 to 1981.

== Distribution and habitat ==
Elaeocarpus elliffii is endemic to north-east Queensland, and is widespread from near Cooktown to Tully where it grows in rainforest at altitudes of 200–1,200 m (660–3,940 ft).

== Conservation status ==
Mountain quandong is listed as of "least concern" under the Queensland Government Nature Conservation Act 1992.
