= Elaeocarpus thelmae =

Mountain quandong

Scientific classification
- Kingdom: Plantae
- Clade: Tracheophytes
- Clade: Angiosperms
- Clade: Eudicots
- Clade: Rosids
- Order: Oxalidales
- Family: Elaeocarpaceae
- Genus: Elaeocarpus
- Species: E. thelmae

Binomial name
- Elaeocarpus thelmae B.Hyland & Coode

Species of tree endemic to Queensland

Elaeocarpus thelmae is a species of flowering plant in the family Elaeocarpaceae and is endemic to north-east Queensland. It is a tree, often with buttress roots at the base of the trunk, egg-shaped to elliptic leaves with many hairy domatia, densely rusty-hairy flowers, and blackish, oval fruit.

== Description ==
Elaeocarpus thelmae is a tree that typically grows to a height of 35 m (115 ft), a dbh of 90 cm (35 in) and often with buttress roots at the base of the trunk. The leaves are elliptic to egg-shaped with the narrower end towards the base, 70–110 mm (2.8–4.3 in) long and 30–50 mm (1.2–2.0 in) wide on a slender petiole 15–25 mm (0.59–0.98 in) long. The leaves have many hairy domatia near vein junctions and have obscure serration on the edges. The flowers are borne in groups of between five and ten on a rachis 25–40 mm (0.98–1.57 in) long, each flower on a robust pedicel 5–7 mm (0.20–0.28 in) long. The flowers have four or five egg-shaped sepals 6–7 mm (0.24–0.28 in) long, 2–3 mm (0.079–0.118 in) wide and densely hairy on the back. The four or five petals are about the same size as the sepals with four to six lobes on the tip, and there are fifty to sixty densely-packed stamens. Flowering occurs in January and the fruit is a blackish, oval drupe 19–23 mm (0.75–0.91 in) long and 12–13 mm (0.47–0.51 in) wide, present from July to October.

== Taxonomy ==
Elaeocarpus thelmae was first formally described in 1984 by Bernard Hyland and Mark James Elgar Coode in the Kew Bulletin.

== Distribution and habitat ==
Elaeocarpus thelmae grows in rainforest in a restricted area on the Windsor Tablelands and nearby areas of north-east Queensland, at altitudes of 400–1,200 m (1,300–3,900 ft).

== Conservation status ==
This quandong is listed as of "least concern" under the Queensland Government Nature Conservation Act 1992.
