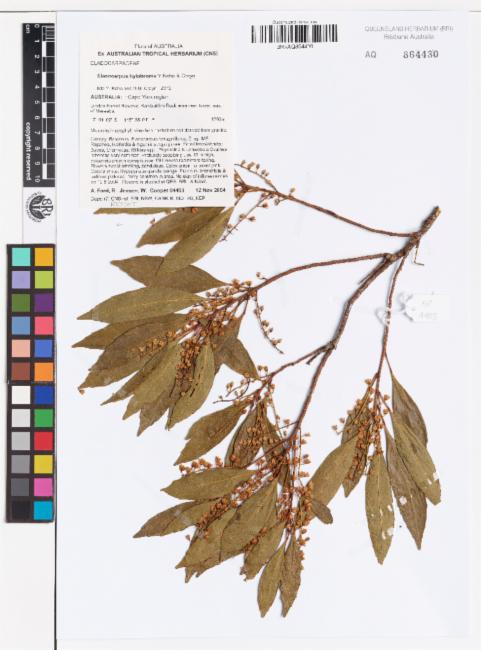

Scientific classification
- Kingdom: Plantae
- Clade: Tracheophytes
- Clade: Angiosperms
- Clade: Eudicots
- Clade: Rosids
- Order: Oxalidales
- Family: Elaeocarpaceae
- Genus: Elaeocarpus
- Species: E. hylobroma

Binomial name
- Elaeocarpus hylobroma Y.Baba & Crayn

= Elaeocarpus hylobroma =

Species of flowering plant endemic to Australia

Elaeocarpus hylobroma is a species of flowering plant in the family Elaeocarpaceae and is endemic to north-east Queensland. It is a small tree with elliptic to egg-shaped leaves with a few serrations near the tip, racemes of white flowers and dull blue, oval fruit.

== Description ==
Elaeocarpus hylobroma is a small tree typically growing to a height of 18 m (59 ft), often coppicing and with pinkish-red adventitious roots. The leaves are clustered near the ends of the branchlets, elliptic to egg-shaped or oblong, 37–106 mm (1.5–4.2 in) long and 10–30 mm (0.39–1.18 in) wide on a petiole 5–19 mm (0.20–0.75 in) long. The leaves are glossy green on the upper surface, paler below, and have between two and six serrations on the outer edges. The flowers are arranged in racemes 18–51 mm (0.71–2.01 in) long with between five and twenty flowers on pale green, sparsely hairy pedicels 2.4–5 mm (0.094–0.197 in) long. The flowers have five cream-coloured to white sepals 2.5–3 mm (0.098–0.118 in) and 1 mm (0.039 in) wide and five, similarly-sized white petals, the tips with between six and nine narrow triangular lobes. There are between eleven and fourteen stamens. Flowering occurs in November and the fruit is a dull blue, oval drupe with pale speckles and 17.5–20 mm (0.69–0.79 in) long, 11–13 mm (0.43–0.51 in) in diameter.

== Taxonomy ==
Elaeocarpus hylobroma was first formally described in 2012 by Yumiko Baba and Darren M. Crayn in the Kew Bulletin from specimens collected in the Dinden National Park near Mareeba in 2004. The specific epithet (hylobroma) means "forest food", referring to the value of the seeds as a food source for native animals.

== Distribution and habitat ==
This species of Elaeocarpus grows in mountain rainforest at altitudes between 900 and 13,300 m (3,000 and 43,600 ft) in the Wet Tropics bioregion of north-east Queensland.

== Conservation status ==
This quandong is listed as of "least concern" under the Queensland Government Nature Conservation Act 1992.
