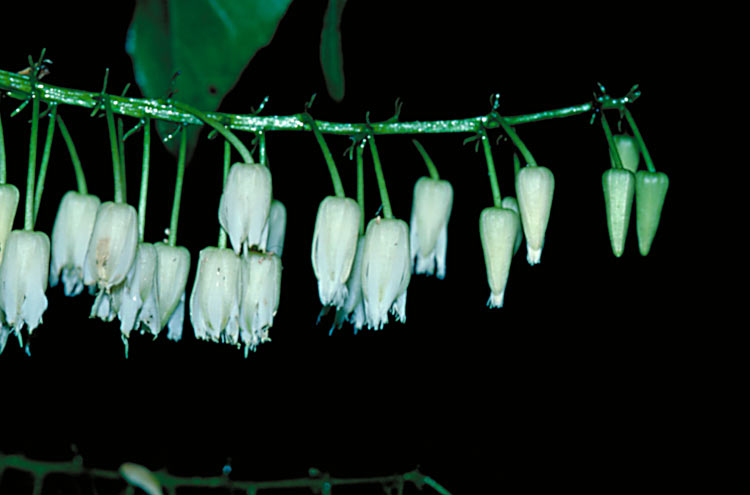
- Flowers

Scientific classification
- Kingdom: Plantae
- Clade: Tracheophytes
- Clade: Angiosperms
- Clade: Eudicots
- Clade: Rosids
- Order: Oxalidales
- Family: Elaeocarpaceae
- Genus: Elaeocarpus
- Species: E. grahamii

Binomial name
- Elaeocarpus grahamii F.Muell.

= Elaeocarpus grahamii =

Species of tree endemic to Queensland

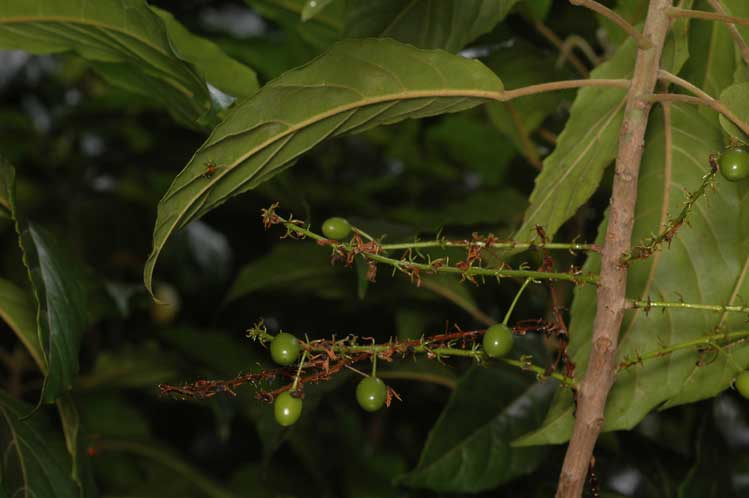
Leaves and fruit in the North Coast Regional Botanic Garden

Elaeocarpus grahamii is a species of flowering plant in the family Elaeocarpaceae and is endemic to north-east Queensland. It is a small to medium-sized tree, sometimes coppicing, with elliptic to egg-shaped leaves, flowers with five petals that have a frilled tip, and oval blue fruit.

== Description ==
Elaeocarpus grahamii is a small to medium-sized tree that often forms a coppice. The leaves are more or less grouped near the ends of the branchlets, elliptic to egg-shaped, 80–150 mm (3.1–5.9 in) long and 25–60 mm (0.98–2.36 in) wide on a petiole 10–25 mm (0.39–0.98 in) long. The flowers are borne in groups of fifteen to thirty on a thin rachis 30–80 mm (1.2–3.1 in) long, each flower on a thin pedicel 6–12 mm (0.24–0.47 in) long. The flowers have five sepals about 6 mm (0.24 in) long and 1–1.5 mm (0.039–0.059 in) wide. The five petals are oblong 7–7.5 mm (0.28–0.30 in) long and 1.5 mm (0.059 in) wide, the tip with between fourteen and eighteen linear lobes 1–2 mm (0.039–0.079 in) long. There are about fifteen stamens and the ovary is glabrous. Flowering mainly occurs from October to November and the fruit is a blue oval drupe about 10–11 mm (0.39–0.43 in) long and 8 mm (0.31 in) wide.

== Taxonomy ==
Elaeocarpus grahamii was first formally described in 1876 by Ferdinand von Mueller in Fragmenta Phytographiae Australiae from material collected by Eugene Fitzalan near the Daintree River. The specific epithet (grahamii) honours von Mueller's friend, George Graham.

== Distribution and habitat ==
Elaeocarpus grahamii grows in rainforest in coastal lowland at altitudes between 600 and 1,550 m (1,970 and 5,090 ft). It is restricted to the area between Cape Tribulation and Mission Beach.

== Conservation status ==
This quandong is listed as of "least concern" under the Queensland Government Nature Conservation Act 1992.
