= Elaeocarpus miegei =

Scientific classification
- Kingdom: Plantae
- Clade: Tracheophytes
- Clade: Angiosperms
- Clade: Eudicots
- Clade: Rosids
- Order: Oxalidales
- Family: Elaeocarpaceae
- Genus: Elaeocarpus
- Species: E. miegei

Binomial name
- Elaeocarpus miegei Weibel

Species of tree endemic to Queensland

Elaeocarpus miegei is a species of flowering plant in the family Elaeocarpaceae and is native to New Guinea, the Bismarck Archipelago, the Solomon Islands and the Tiwi Islands of the Northern Territory. It is a tall tree with lance-shaped to egg-shaped leaves with the narrower end towards the base, whitish to cream-coloured flowers and bright blue, elliptical fruit.

== Description ==
Elaeocarpus miegei is a that typically grows to a height of 35 m (115 ft). The leaves are leathery, lance-shaped to egg-shaped with the narrower end towards the base, or elliptic, 40–170 mm (1.6–6.7 in) long and 20–76 mm (0.79–2.99 in) wide on a petiole 10–30 mm (0.39–1.18 in) long. The flowers are arranged in racemes up to 100 mm (3.9 in) long, each flower on a pedicel up to 10 mm (0.39 in) long. The four or five sepals are 4.5–5 mm (0.18–0.20 in) long, 0.5–1 mm (0.020–0.039 in) wide and the four or five petals are whitish-cream, oblong to egg-shaped with the narrower end towards the base, about 5 mm (0.20 in) long and 1.5–2.5 mm (0.059–0.098 in) wide. There are between eight and fifteen stamens. Flowering occurs from January to July and the fruit is an elliptical drupe about 17 mm (0.67 in) long and 12 mm (0.47 in) wide.

== Taxonomy ==
Elaeocarpus miegei was first formally described in 1971 by Raymond Weibel in the journal Candollea.

== Distribution and habitat ==
Elaeocarpus miegei grows in rainforest supplied by spring water. It is found in New Guinea, the Bismarck Archipelago, the Solomon Islands and the Tiwi Islands.

== Conservation status ==
Elaeocarpus miegei is listed as "critically endangered" in the Northern Territory under the Northern Territory Government Territory Parks and Wildlife Conservation Act 1976.
