= Elaeocarpus achmadii =

Scientific classification
- Kingdom: Plantae
- Clade: Tracheophytes
- Clade: Angiosperms
- Clade: Eudicots
- Clade: Rosids
- Order: Oxalidales
- Family: Elaeocarpaceae
- Genus: Elaeocarpus
- Species: E. achmadii

Binomial name
- Elaeocarpus achmadii Coode
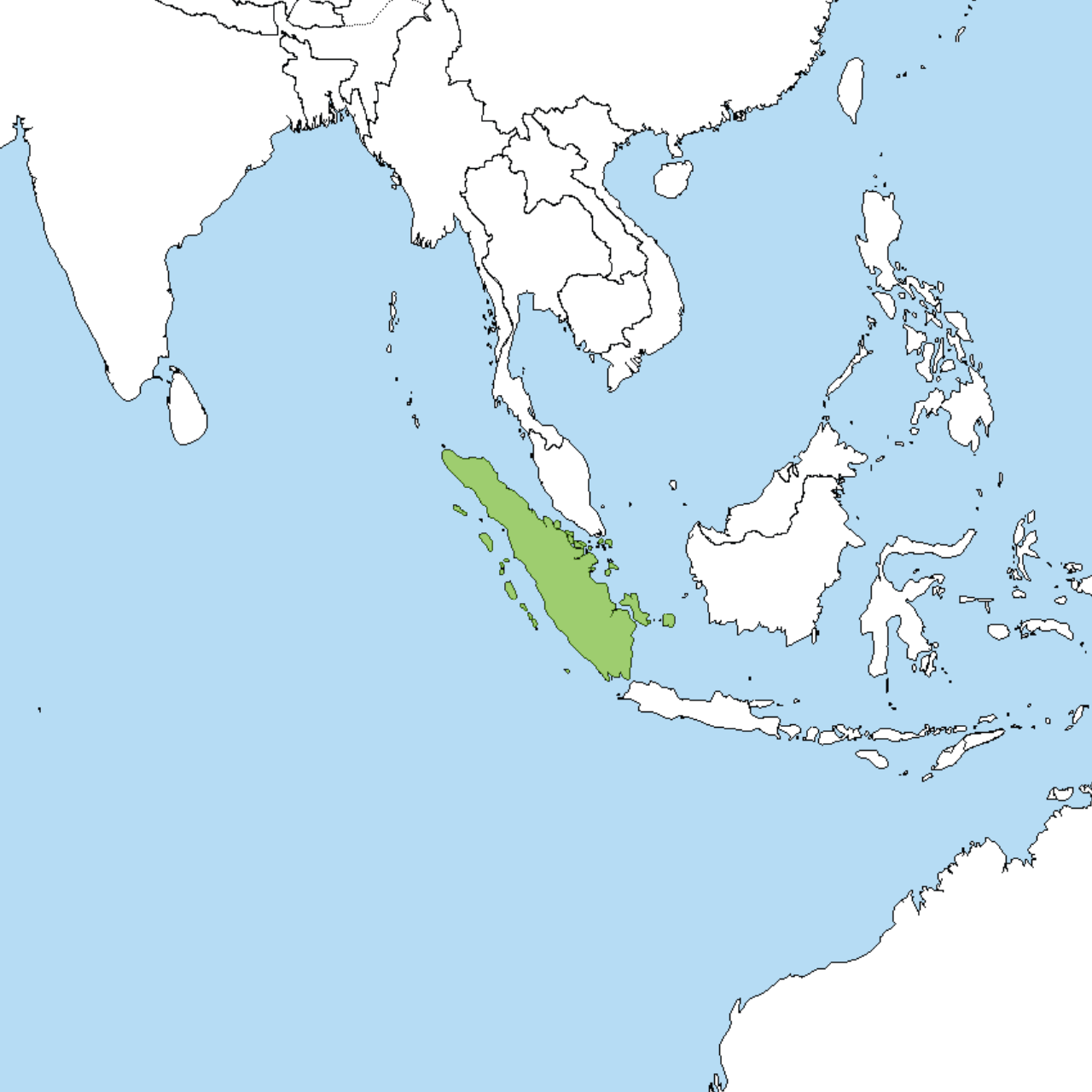
- Range of E. achmadii in southeast Asia

Species of plant

Elaeocarpus achmadii is a species of flowering tree or shrub native to the island of Sumatra.

== Description ==
Elaeocarpus achmadii bears simple, alternately-arranged leaves alongside a blue or black berry-like fruit.

== Distribution and habitat ==
Elaeocarpus achmadii is native to the Indonesian island of Sumatra, growing primarily in a wet tropical habitat.
