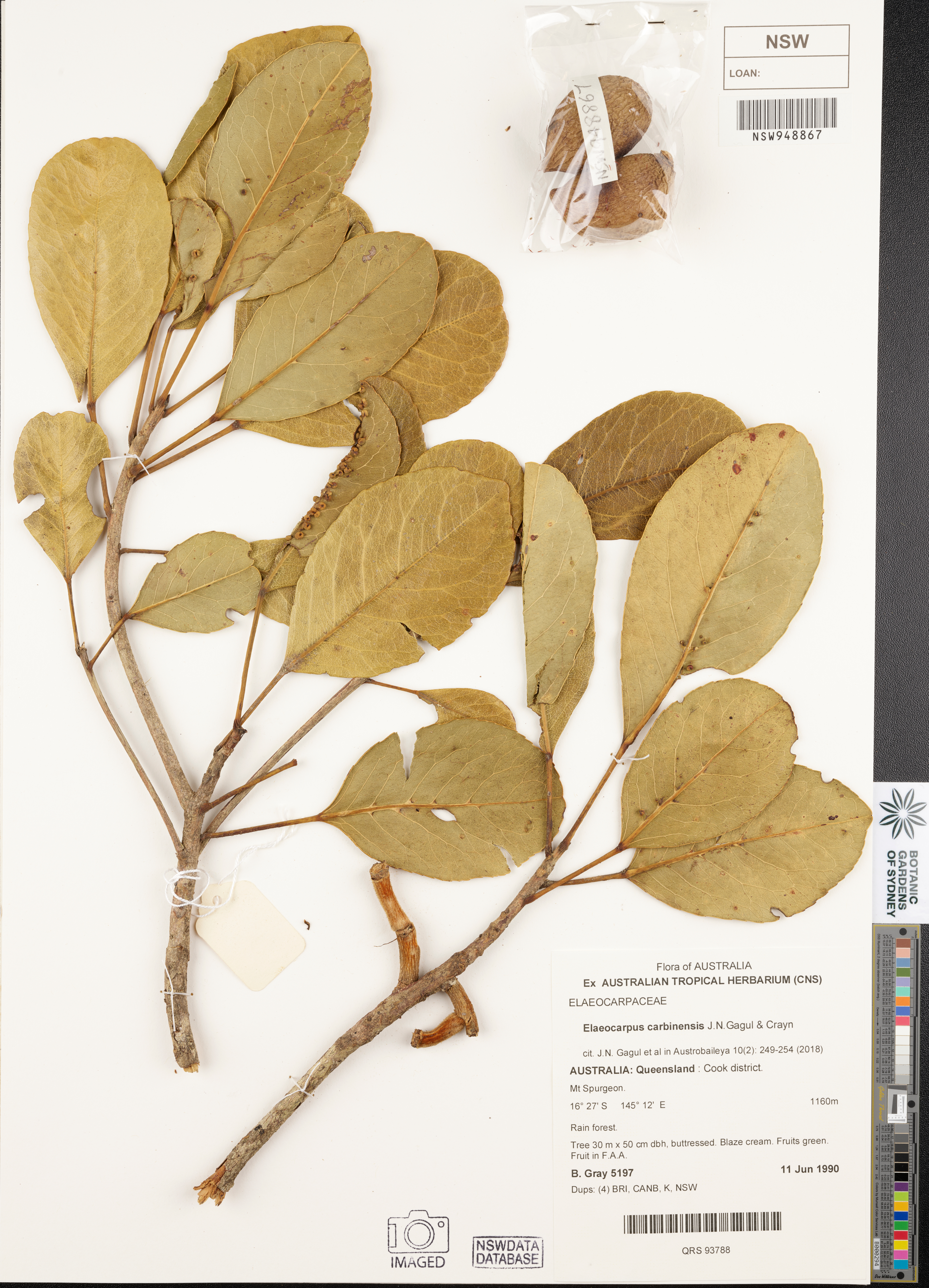
- Herbarium specimen

Conservation status
- Critically Endangered (NCA)

Scientific classification
- Kingdom: Plantae
- Clade: Tracheophytes
- Clade: Angiosperms
- Clade: Eudicots
- Clade: Rosids
- Order: Oxalidales
- Family: Elaeocarpaceae
- Genus: Elaeocarpus
- Species: E. carbinensis

Binomial name
- Elaeocarpus carbinensis J.N.Gagul & Crayn

= Elaeocarpus carbinensis =

Species of flowering plant

Elaeocarpus carbinensis is a species of tree in the family Elaeocarpaceae. It is endemic to Queensland.

== Description ==
It can grow up to 30 metres tall, with blaze yellow, white, cream or brown coloured outer bark and simple, alternately arranged leaves. It has white and cream coloured flowers as well as ovoid/ellipsoid, dark blue or grey coloured drupaceous fruit.

== Habitat and distribution ==
The species is restricted to the Carbine Tableland west of Mossman and has been recorded on Mt Spurgeon, Mt Lewis and Mt Misery at elevations ranging from 940–1260 m.

It occurs in notophyll vine forest and mixed mesophyll vine forest on soils derived from granite or a mixture of granite and basic volcanic rocks.
