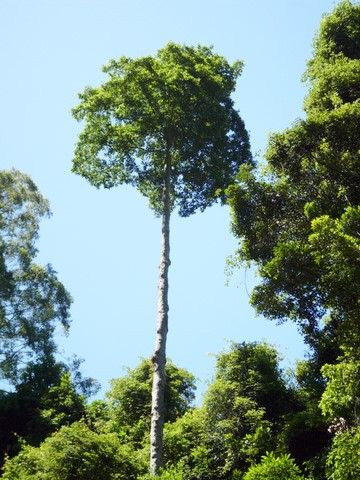
- Elaeocarpus obovatus growing at Watagans National Park, Australia

Scientific classification
- Kingdom: Plantae
- Clade: Tracheophytes
- Clade: Angiosperms
- Clade: Eudicots
- Clade: Rosids
- Order: Oxalidales
- Family: Elaeocarpaceae
- Genus: Elaeocarpus
- Species: E. obovatus

Binomial name
- Elaeocarpus obovatus G.Don

Synonyms
- List: Elaeocarpus donianus F.Muell. nom. illeg., nom. superfl.; Elaeocarpus eucalyptifolius R.Knuth; Elaeocarpus obovatus G.Don var. obovatus; Elaeocarpus parviflora A.Rich. orth. var.; Elaeocarpus parviflorus A.Rich.

= Elaeocarpus obovatus =

Hard quandong

Species of flowering plant endemic to Australia

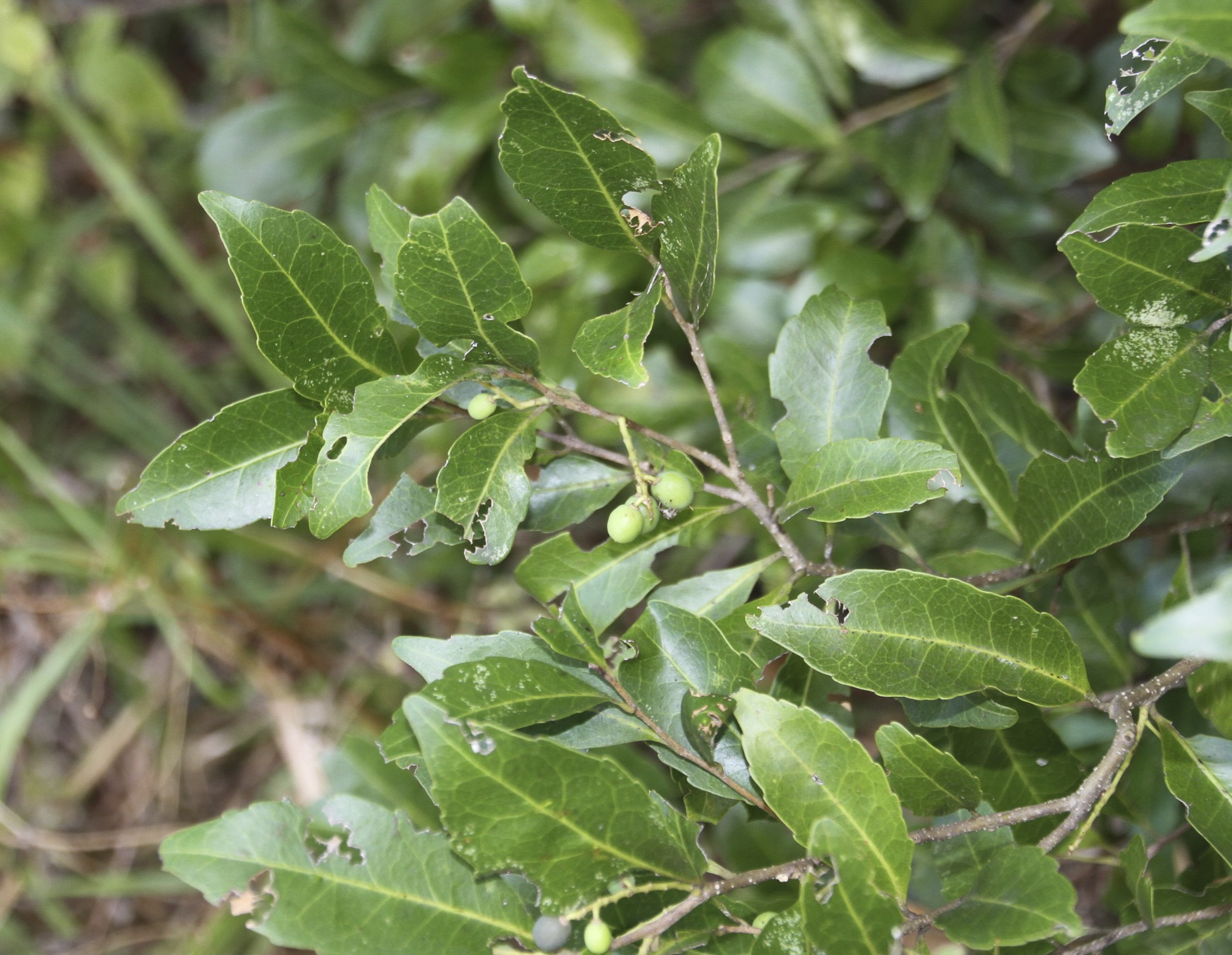
Leaves and immature fruit at Mount Mellum

Elaeocarpus obovatus, commonly known as hard quandong, blueberry ash, whitewood, grey carabeen, freckled oliveberry or gray carrobeen, is a species of flowering plant in the family Elaeocarpaceae and is endemic to eastern Australia. It is a tree with buttress roots at the base of the trunk, egg-shaped to lance-shaped leaves with the narrower end towards the base, racemes of white flowers, and blue, oval fruit.

== Description ==
Elaeocarpus obovatus is sometimes a small tree 3–10 m (9.8–32.8 ft) tall, and sometimes a tall tree growing to a height of 45 m (148 ft) with buttress roots at the base of a trunk that is up to 150 cm (59 in) in diameter. The outer bark is smooth, grey and thin with corky irregularities. The leaves are arranged alternately, egg-shaped to lance-shaped with the narrower end towards the base, 40–85 mm (1.6–3.3 in) long and 14–22 mm (0.55–0.87 in) wide on a petiole 2–6 mm (0.079–0.236 in) long. The edges of the leaves are wavy, scalloped or toothed and the midrib is raised on the upper and lower surfaces. The flowers are arranged in racemes of ten to twenty 40–80 mm (1.6–3.1 in) long, each on a pedicel 4–5 mm (0.16–0.20 in) long with four or five egg-shaped to triangular sepals 2–3 mm (0.079–0.118 in) long and 1–1.5 mm (0.039–0.059 in) wide. The petals are white, egg-shaped to oblong and about the same size as the sepals with the tip divided into eight to ten lobes and there are about twenty very short stamens. Flowering occurs from late August to October and the fruit is an oval to elliptical blue drupe about 10 mm (0.39 in) long and 8 mm (0.31 in) wide, containing a single seed. Fruiting occurs in January to April.

== Taxonomy ==
Elaeocarpus obovatus was first formally described in 1831 by George Don in his book A General History of Dichlamydeous Plants. In 2020, a subspecies of the plant was recognised, Elaeocarpus obovatus subsp. umbratilis, based on phylogenetic analysis. The subspecies is endemic to Queensland, occurring between the Big Tableland and the Paluma Range in rainforests.

In 1863, George Bentham described a variety of the species, Elaeocarpus obovatus var. foveolatus, which was later synonymised with Elaeocarpus arnhemicus.

== Distribution and habitat ==
Hard quandong is a tall tree in subtropical rainforest and a small to medium-sized tree in drier rainforest and occurs from Proserpine, Queensland (20° S) in central-eastern Queensland and south to Wyong (33° S) in New South Wales.
