= Elaeocarpus recurvatus =

Conservation status
- Endangered (IUCN 3.1)

Scientific classification
- Kingdom: Plantae
- Clade: Tracheophytes
- Clade: Angiosperms
- Clade: Eudicots
- Clade: Rosids
- Order: Oxalidales
- Family: Elaeocarpaceae
- Genus: Elaeocarpus
- Species: E. recurvatus

Binomial name
- Elaeocarpus recurvatus Corner

Species of flowering plant endemic to India

Elaeocarpus recurvatus is a species of flowering plant in the Elaeocarpaceae family. It is found only in the Anamalai and Nilgiri Hills in the Western Ghats of southern India. It grows in montane evergreen rain forest and shola forest above 1,800 metres (5,900 ft) elevation. It is threatened by habitat loss.
