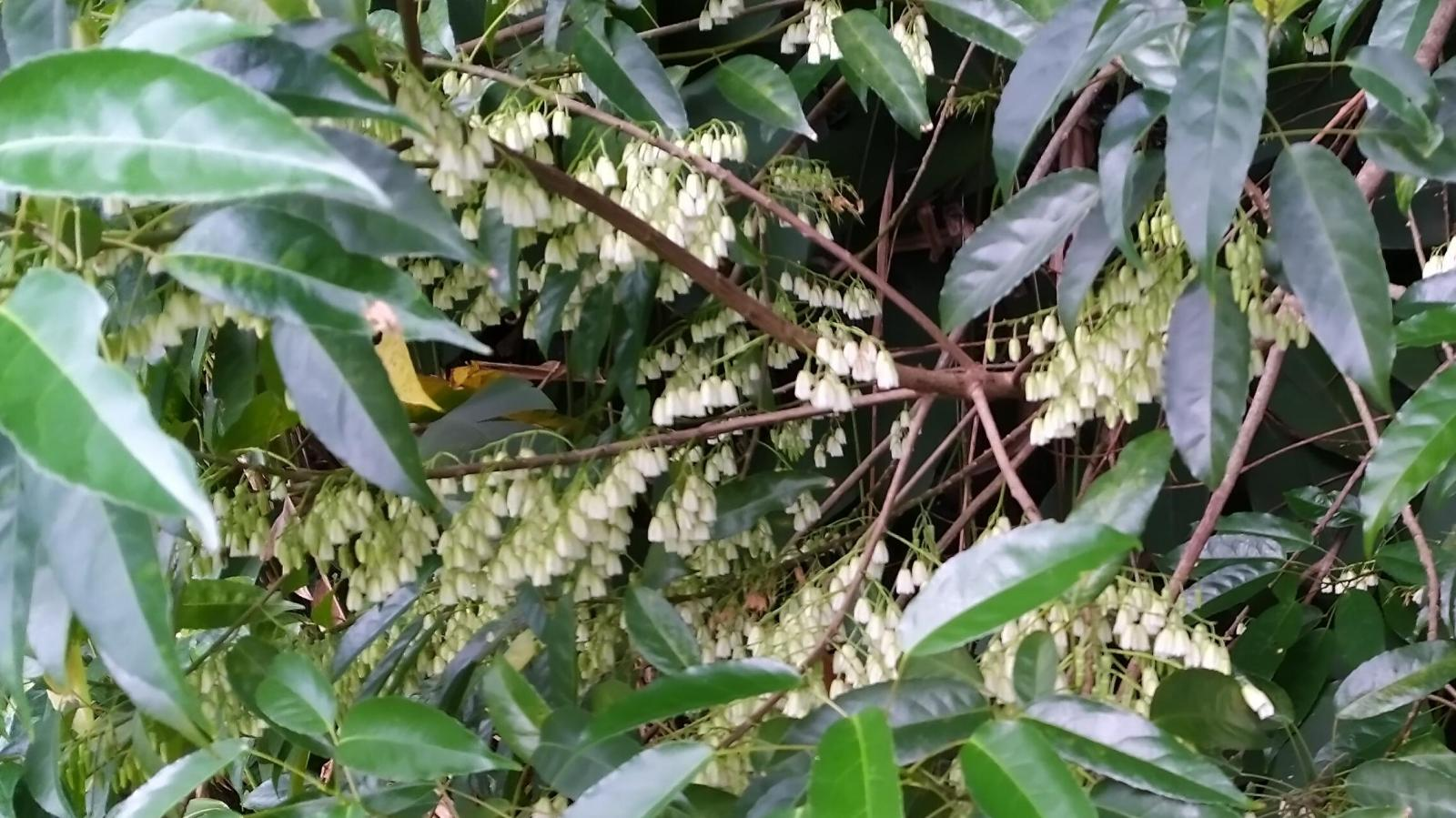
- Elaeocarpus culminicola flowering

Conservation status
- Least Concern (IUCN 3.1)

Scientific classification
- Kingdom: Plantae
- Clade: Tracheophytes
- Clade: Angiosperms
- Clade: Eudicots
- Clade: Rosids
- Order: Oxalidales
- Family: Elaeocarpaceae
- Genus: Elaeocarpus
- Species: E. culminicola

Binomial name
- Elaeocarpus culminicola Warb.

Synonyms
- 12 synonyms: Elaeocarpus boridiensis R.Knuth; Elaeocarpus gjellerupii Pulle; Elaeocarpus longipetiolatus C.T.White; Elaeocarpus maquilingensis Elmer; Elaeocarpus michaelii C.T.White; Elaeocarpus microphyllus Elmer; Elaeocarpus patens R.Knuth; Elaeocarpus pendulus Merr.; Elaeocarpus populneoides R.Knuth; Elaeocarpus populneus Schltr.; Elaeocarpus rugulosus R.Knuth; Elaeocarpus sogerensis Baker f.; Elaeocarpus viscosus Warb.

= Elaeocarpus culminicola =

Michael's quandong

Species of flowering plant

Elaeocarpus culminicola, commonly known as Michael's quandong, is a species of flowering plant in the family Elaeocarpaceae and is native to parts of Malesia and Australasia. It is a tree with wavy leaves with wavy or toothed edges, racemes of white, cream-coloured or pink flowers and more or less spherical fruit.

== Description ==
Elaeocarpus culmanicola is an evergreen tree to 25 m (82 ft) with a trunk diameter to 25 cm (9.8 in). The leaves are glossy dark green, narrow elliptic to lance-shaped or egg-shaped, 67–137 mm (2.6–5.4 in) long and 24–37 mm (0.94–1.46 in) wide on a petiole 13–40 mm (0.51–1.57 in) long. The leaves have wavy or toothed edges and are arranged spirally around, and crowded towards the end of the branches. The flowers are arranged in racemes up to about 40 mm (1.6 in) long and attached to the twig behind or below the leaves, each flower on a pedicel up to 10 mm (0.39 in) long. The fragrance from the flowers is strong but not particularly pleasant. The five sepals are 6.8–9 mm (0.27–0.35 in) long and the five petals are white to cream-coloured or pink, 7.5–10 mm (0.30–0.39 in) long and 2–4.6 mm (0.079–0.181 in) wide with about twenty-six lobes at the tip. There are about twenty-five to forty stamens. Flowering occurs in late winter and is normally profuse. The bright blue fruit is a more or less spherical or elliptic drupe about 13–15 mm (0.51–0.59 in) long and 12 mm (0.47 in) wide, appear in late spring and may stay on the branch until the next flowering.

== Taxonomy ==
Elaeocarpus culminicola was first formally described in 1892 by Otto Warburg in Botanische Jahrbücher für Systematik, Pflanzengeschichte und Pflanzengeographie from specimens collected in the Finisterre Range in 1888. The specific epithet (culminicola) means "peak dweller".

== Range and habitat ==
Michael's quandong is native to the Philippines, Sulawesi, Maluku Islands, New Guinea, Bismarck Archipelago, the Northern Territory and Queensland, where it is an understorey tree in well developed rainforest. It is often associated with wet or swampy conditions.

== Ecology ==
The fruits of E. culminicola are eaten by cassowaries.

== Uses ==
The timber is a commercial hardwood.

== Gallery ==
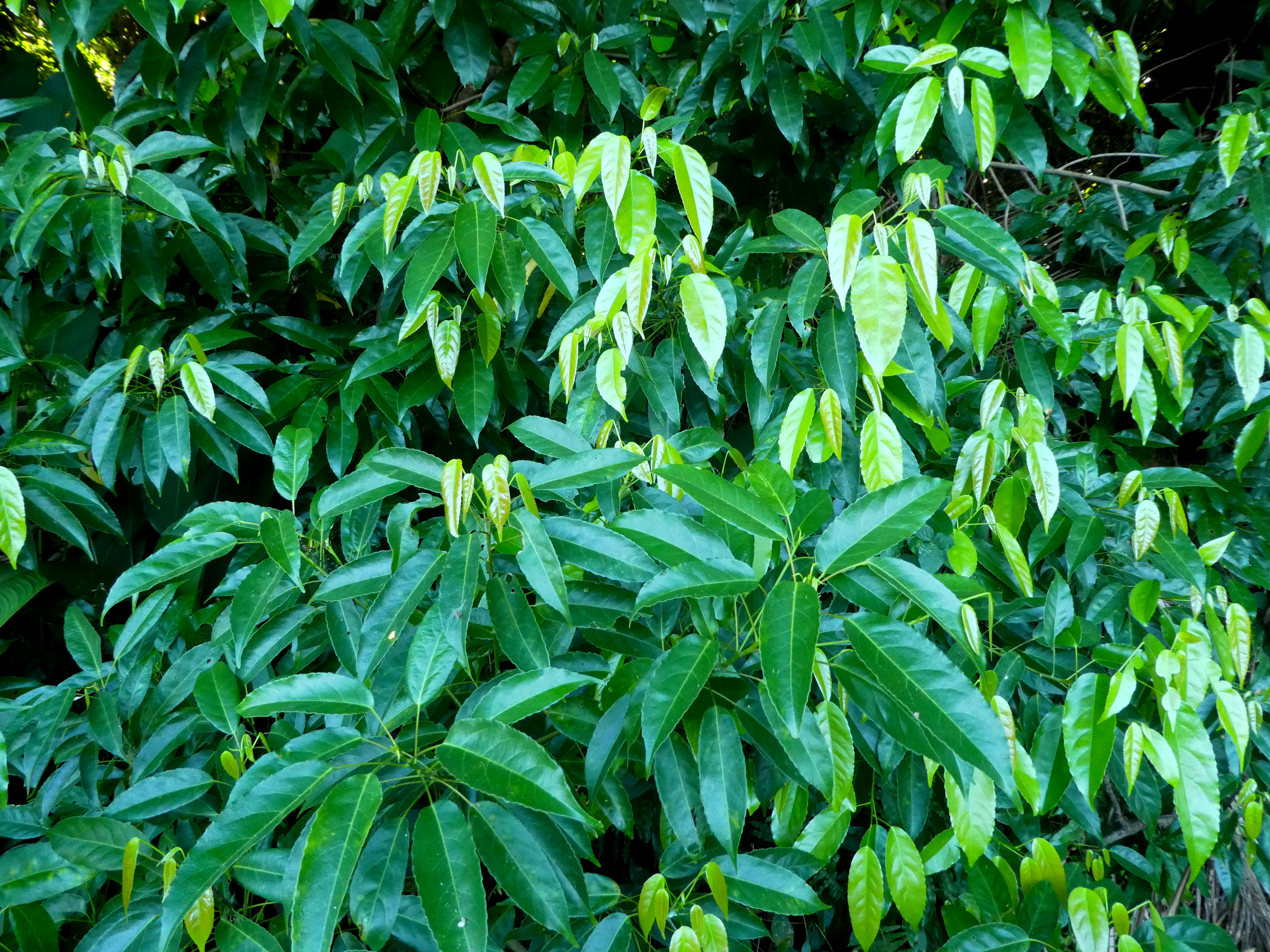
Foliage

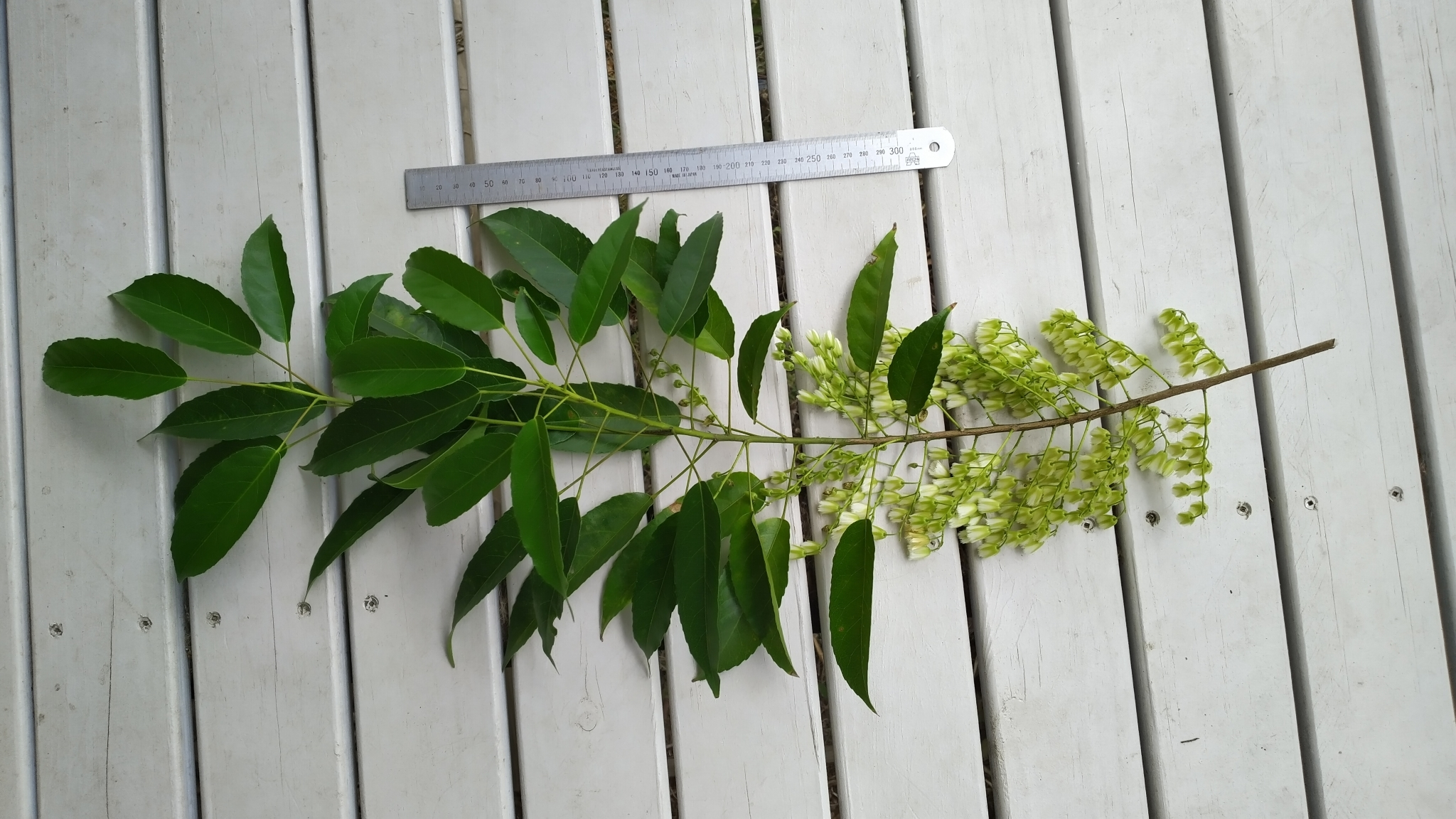
Flowering branch

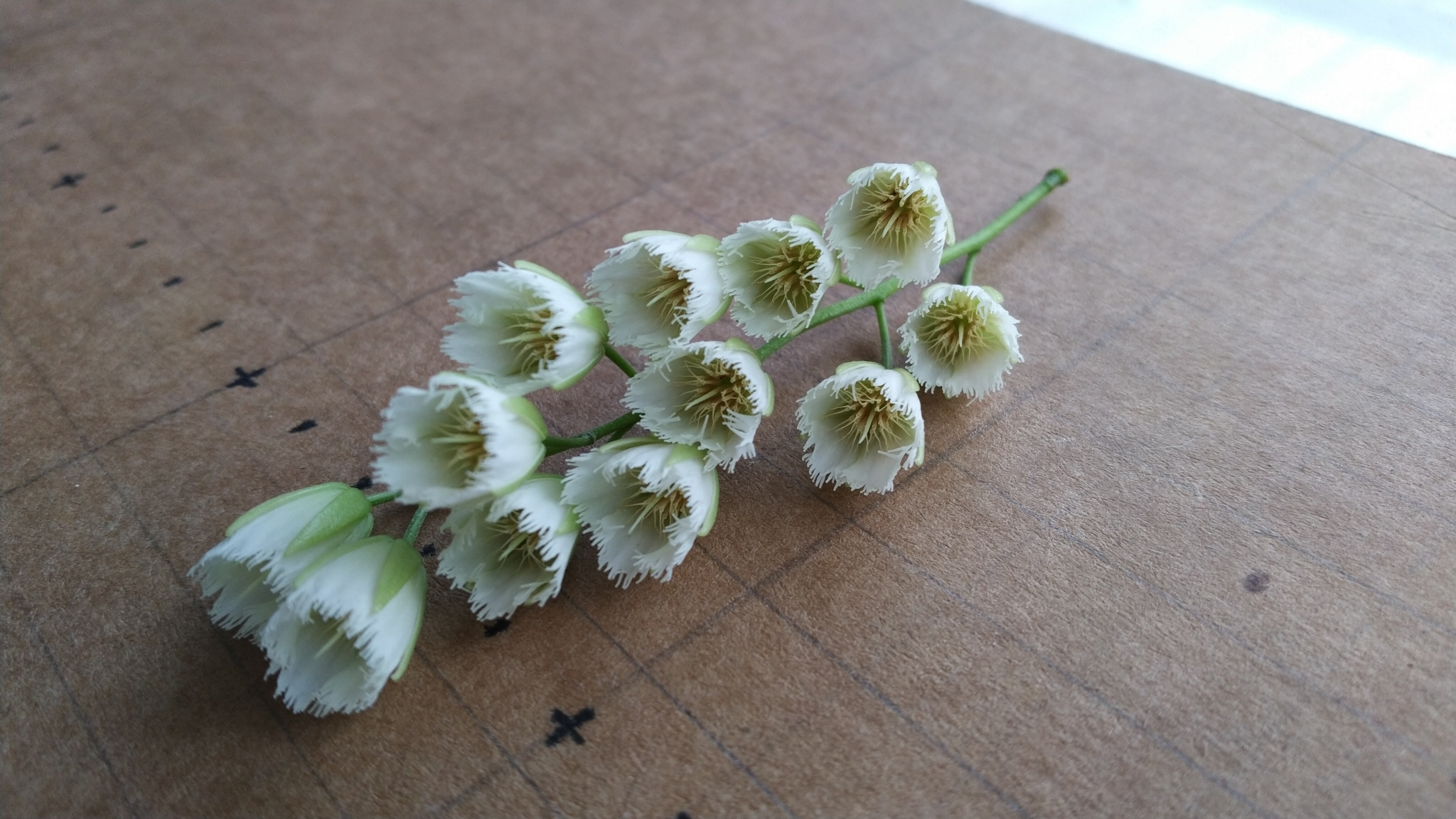
Inflorescence

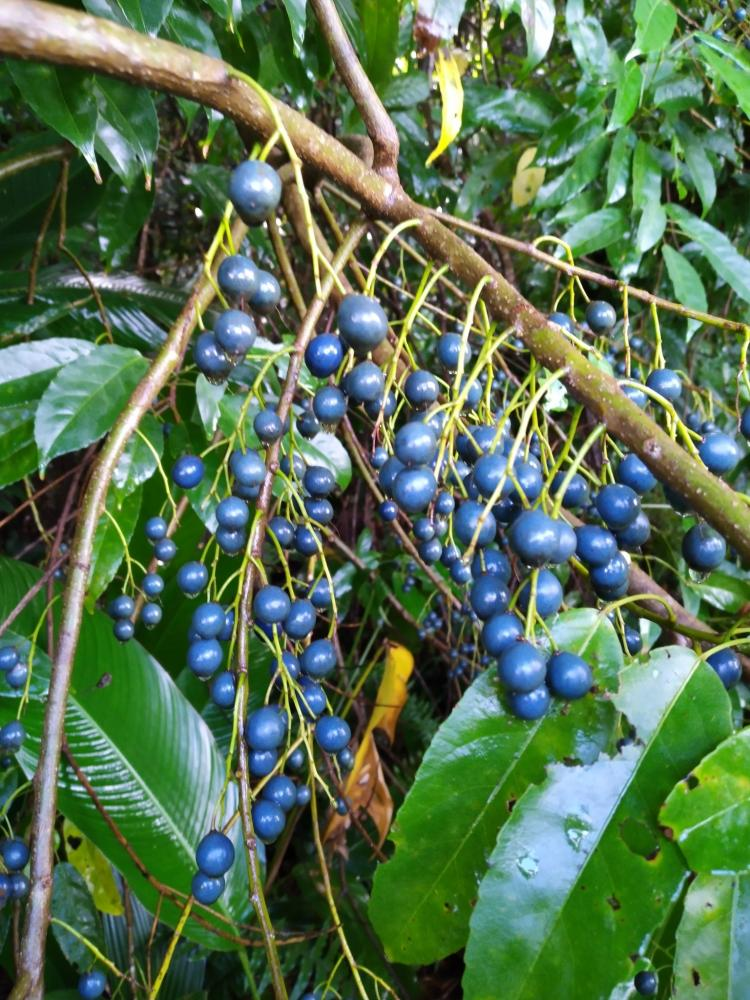
Fruiting

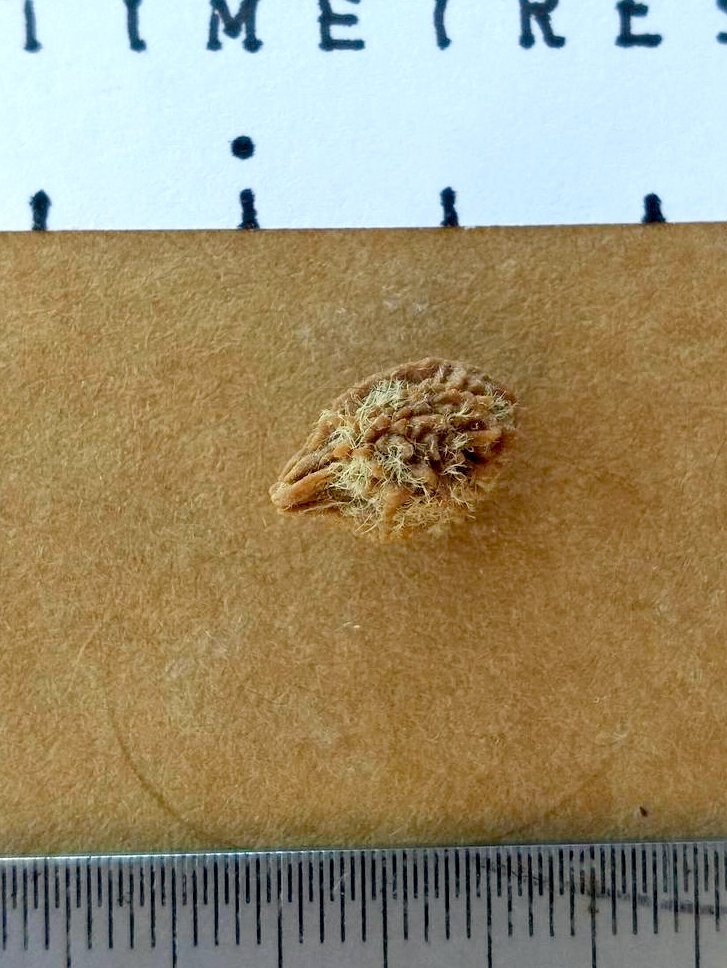
Seed
