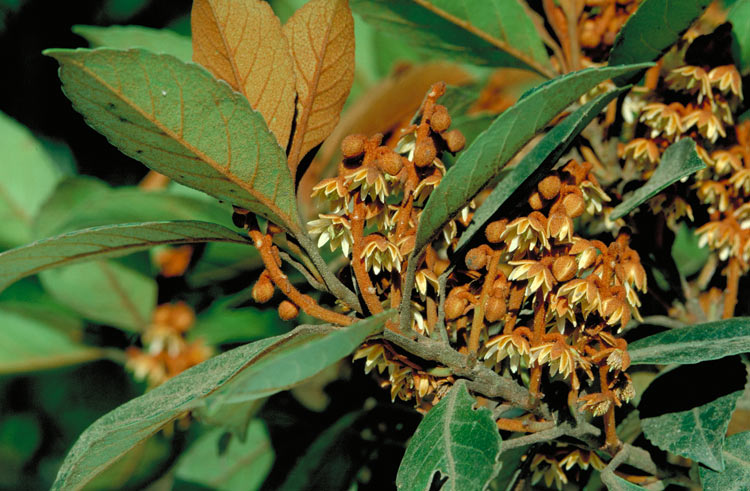

Scientific classification
- Kingdom: Plantae
- Clade: Tracheophytes
- Clade: Angiosperms
- Clade: Eudicots
- Clade: Rosids
- Order: Oxalidales
- Family: Elaeocarpaceae
- Genus: Elaeocarpus
- Species: E. ferruginiflorus

Binomial name
- Elaeocarpus ferruginiflorus C.T.White

= Elaeocarpus ferruginiflorus =

Species of tree endemic to Queensland

Elaeocarpus ferruginiflorus is a species of flowering plant in the family Elaeocarpaceae and is endemic to north-east Queensland. It is a small to medium-sized tree, sometimes with buttress roots at the base of the trunk, elliptic to egg-shaped leaves, flowers with five white petals, and dark bluish-grey fruit.

== Description ==
Elaeocarpus ferruginiflorus is a tree that typically grows to a height of 8–20 m (26–66 ft), sometimes with buttress roots at the base of the trunk. Its young leaves and shoots are densely covered with rust-coloured hairs. The leaves are elliptic to egg-shaped with the narrower end towards the base, 35–60 mm (1.4–2.4 in) long and 15–35 mm (0.59–1.38 in) wide on a petiole 5–12 mm (0.20–0.47 in) long. The flowers are borne in groups of up to about ten on a rachis 20–50 mm (0.79–1.97 in) long, each flower on a pedicel 3–4 mm (0.12–0.16 in) long. The flowers are densely covered with woolly reddish brown hairs. The five sepals are 5–6 mm (0.20–0.24 in) long and 2–3 mm (0.079–0.118 in) wide, the five petals thick, about 6 mm (0.24 in) long and 1.5 mm (0.059 in) wide, sometimes with about three indistinct teeth on the tip, and there are forty stamens. Flowering mainly occurs in January and the fruit is a more or less spherical or oval, dark bluish-grey drupe about 17 mm (0.67 in) long and 11 mm (0.43 in) wide, present from July to October.

== Taxonomy ==
Elaeocarpus ferruginiflorus was first formally described in 1933 by Cyril Tenison White in Contributions from the Arnold Arboretum of Harvard University from material collected in on Mount Bellenden Ker.

== Distribution and habitat ==
Elaeocarpus ferruginiflorus grows in rainforest at altitudes between 600 and 1,550 m (1,970 and 5,090 ft). It is restricted to the area between Cedar Bay National Park and Hinchinbrook Island.

== Conservation status ==
This quandong is listed as of "least concern" under the Queensland Government Nature Conservation Act 1992.

== Use in horticulture ==
This small, slow-growing tree features rusty-coloured new growth.
