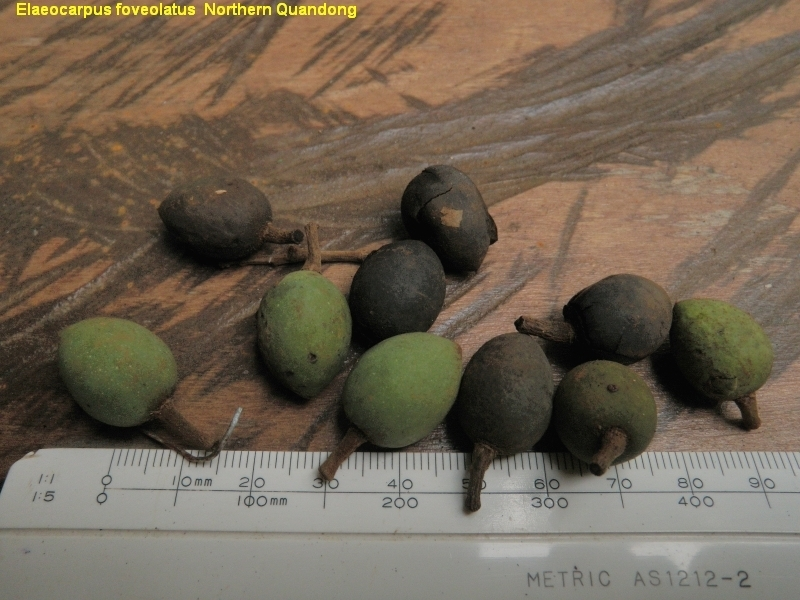

Scientific classification
- Kingdom: Plantae
- Clade: Tracheophytes
- Clade: Angiosperms
- Clade: Eudicots
- Clade: Rosids
- Order: Oxalidales
- Family: Elaeocarpaceae
- Genus: Elaeocarpus
- Species: E. foveolatus

Binomial name
- Elaeocarpus foveolatus F.Muell.

= Elaeocarpus foveolatus =

White quandong

Species of tree endemic to Queensland

Elaeocarpus foveolatus, commonly known as white quandong or northern quandong, is a species of flowering plant in the family Elaeocarpaceae and is endemic to Queensland. It is a medium-sized tree, sometimes with buttress roots at the base of the trunk, variably-shaped leaves with serrated edges, flowers with five petals often with a few short lobes or teeth on the tip, and elliptic to oval fruit.

== Description ==
Elaeocarpus foveolatus is a tree that typically grows to a height of 33 m (108 ft), sometimes with buttress roots at the base of the trunk. The leaves are variable in shape, often egg-shaped with the lower end towards the base, 45–100 mm (1.8–3.9 in) long and 15–35 mm (0.59–1.38 in) wide on a hairy petiole 4–15 mm (0.16–0.59 in) long. The leaves often develop domatia and have wavy-toothed edges. The flowers are borne in groups of four to twelve on a rachis 10–40 mm (0.39–1.57 in) long, each flower on a pedicel 4–6 mm (0.16–0.24 in) long. The flowers have five elliptic sepals about 4.5 mm (0.18 in) long and 2 mm (0.079 in) wide. The five petals are elliptic to oblong, 4.5–7 mm (0.18–0.28 in) long and about 2 mm (0.079 in) wide, often with between three and five short lobes on the tip. There are more than fifty stamens and the ovary is hairy. Flowering occurs from December to January and the fruit is an elliptic to oval drupe up to 16 mm (0.63 in) long and 13 mm (0.51 in) wide, present from June to October.

== Taxonomy ==
Elaeocarpus foveolatus was first formally described in 1866 by Ferdinand von Mueller in Fragmenta Phytographiae Australiae from material collected by John Dallachy in mountains near Rockingham Bay. The specific epithet (foveolatus) means "minutely pitted".

== Distribution and habitat ==
Elaeocarpus foveolatus is endemic to Queensland, and is widespread in the north and central-eastern areas of that state where it grows in rainforest at altitudes of up to 1,200 m (3,900 ft).

== Conservation status ==
White quandong is listed as of "least concern" under the Queensland Government Nature Conservation Act 1992.
