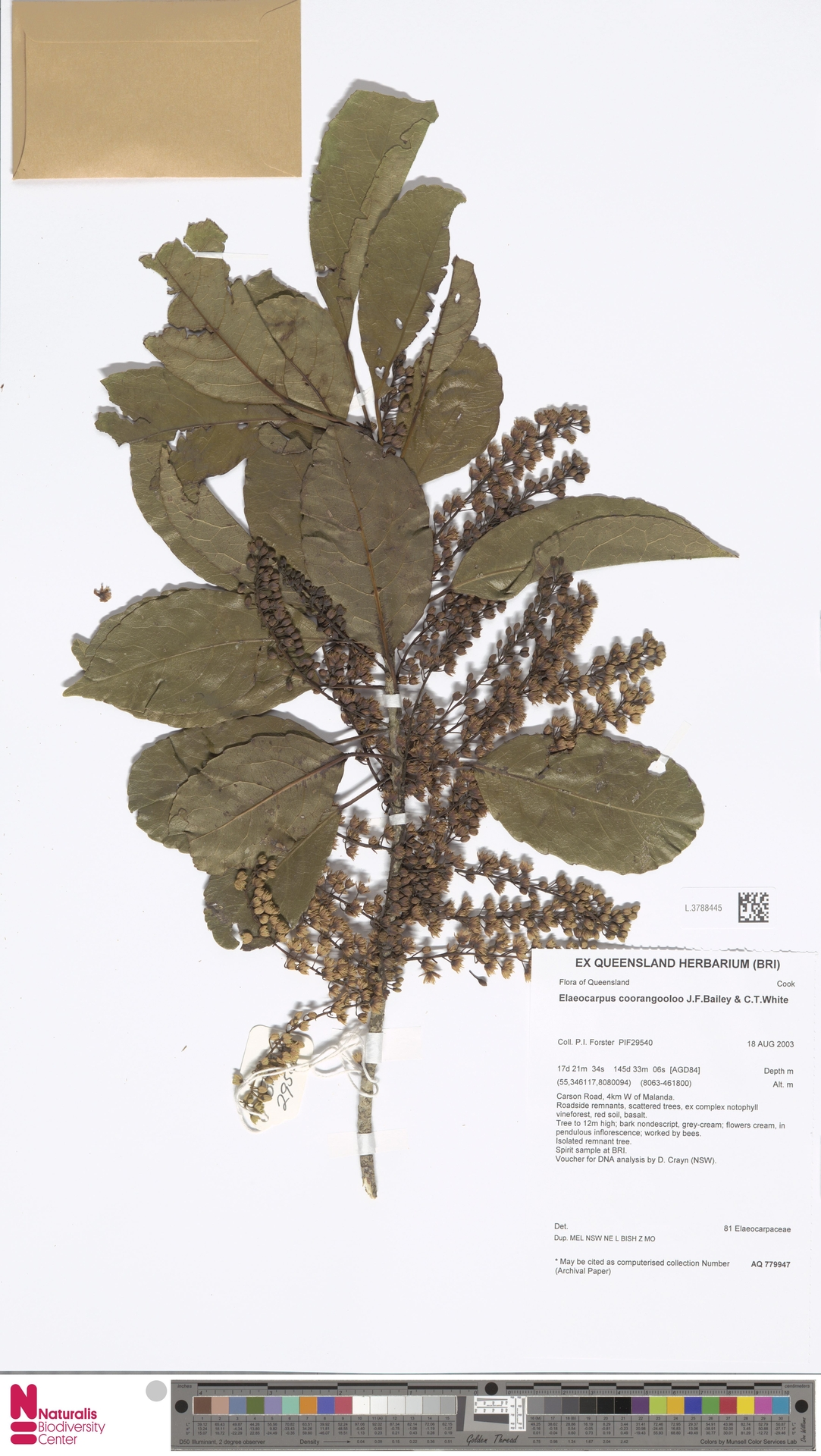

Scientific classification
- Kingdom: Plantae
- Clade: Tracheophytes
- Clade: Angiosperms
- Clade: Eudicots
- Clade: Rosids
- Order: Oxalidales
- Family: Elaeocarpaceae
- Genus: Elaeocarpus
- Species: E. coorangooloo

Binomial name
- Elaeocarpus coorangooloo J.F.Bailey & C.T.White

= Elaeocarpus coorangooloo =

Brown quandong

Species of tree found in Australia

Elaeocarpus coorangooloo, commonly known as brown quandong or Coorangooloo quandong, is a species of flowering plant in the family Elaeocarpaceae and is endemic to north-east Queensland in Australia. It is a tree with elliptic leaves, white flowers with lobed petals, and spherical fruit.

== Description ==
Elaeocarpus coorangooloo is a tree with elliptic leaves about 70–110 mm (2.8–4.3 in) long and 30–55 mm (1.2–2.2 in) wide with wavy edges. Old leaves turn red before falling. The flowers have sepals less than 14 mm (0.55 in) long and petals 4.5–5.5 mm (0.18–0.22 in) long with thin lobes at the tip, and there are between fifteen and twenty stamens. The fruit is a more or less spherical drupe about 12 mm (0.47 in) long and 9 mm (0.35 in) wide.

== Taxonomy ==
Elaeocarpus coorangooloo was first formally described in 1917 by John Frederick Bailey and Cyril Tenison White in the Botany Bulletin of the Department of Agriculture, Queensland, from material collected by H.W. Mocatta in the Atherton district.

== Distribution and habitat ==
Elaeocarpus coorangooloo is endemic to north-east Queensland in Australia, where it is only known from the Windsor Tableland and near Paluma, growing in dry rainforest at altitudes of 700–1,000 m (2,300–3,300 ft).

== Conservation status ==
Brown quandong is listed as 'near threatened' under the Queensland Government Nature Conservation Act 1992.

== See also ==
- List of Elaeocarpus species
