= Elaeocarpus arnhemicus =

Blue plum

Scientific classification
- Kingdom: Plantae
- Clade: Tracheophytes
- Clade: Angiosperms
- Clade: Eudicots
- Clade: Rosids
- Order: Oxalidales
- Family: Elaeocarpaceae
- Genus: Elaeocarpus
- Species: E. arnhemicus

Binomial name
- Elaeocarpus arnhemicus Blume

Species of flowering plant

Elaeocarpus arnhemicus, the blue plum, bony quandong or Arnhem Land quandong, or simply elaeocarpus, is a species of flowering plant in the family Elaeocarpaceae and is native to northern Australia, New Guinea, Timor and certain other islands in the Indonesian Archipelago. It is a tree with narrow elliptic to lance-shaped or egg-shaped leaves with serrated edges, racemes of white or cream-coloured flowers and metallic blue fruit.

== Description ==
Elaeocarpus arnhemicus is a small to large tree. Although it was once believed to often grow as a shrub and only grow to a height of 15 m (49 ft) with a DBH of up to 30 cm (12 in), it is now known that it can become a much larger plant, up to 40 m (130 ft) high.

The leaves are narrow elliptic to lance-shaped or egg-shaped, 50–122 mm (2.0–4.8 in) long and 20–53 mm (0.79–2.09 in) wide with serrations on the edges, on a petiole 3–15 mm (0.12–0.59 in) long. The flowers are arranged in racemes up to 60 mm (2.4 in) long, each flower on a pedicel up to 5 mm (0.20 in) long. The sepals are ovate, 2.5–3 mm (0.098–0.118 in) long and 1.4–2 mm (0.055–0.079 in) wide. The petals are obovate, white or cream-coloured, 2.7–4.2 mm (0.11–0.17 in) long and 1.5–3.1 mm (0.059–0.122 in) wide, the tip with 7-12 linear lobes. Both the petals and sepals are usually only 3–3.5 mm (0.12–0.14 in) long. There are between fifteen and eighteen, sometimes up to twenty, stamens and the style is 1.2–2 mm (0.047–0.079 in) long and glabrous. Flowering occurs from January to July and the fruit is an elliptical, metallic blue drupe 8.2–16.5 mm (0.32–0.65 in) long and 6.5–12.5 mm (0.26–0.49 in) wide.

This species is best identified among other Elaeocarpus species when in flower.

== Taxonomy and naming ==
Elaeocarpus arnhemicus was first formally described in 1868 by Ferdinand von Mueller in his book Fragmenta Phytographiae Australiae.

It is placed in the Fissipetalum group of Elaeocarpus species.

== Distribution and habitat ==
Blue plum grows in riparian rainforest and some other habitats in the northern part of the Northern Territory, Cape York Peninsula, north-east Queensland and New Guinea at altitudes up to 500 m (1,600 ft) above sea level. In 2001 the known range was expanded to Java, Timor, Flores, Sumba and Sulawesi. After receiving some new specimens, M. J. E. Coode, expert Elaeocarpus taxonomist, realised that a few old specimens from two collection localities that he and his colleague Raymond Weibel had never been able to identify, were actually E. arnhemicus, considerably expanding its range.

== See also ==
- List of Elaeocarpus species
