= Elaeocarpus sericopetalus =

Hard quandong

Scientific classification
- Kingdom: Plantae
- Clade: Tracheophytes
- Clade: Angiosperms
- Clade: Eudicots
- Clade: Rosids
- Order: Oxalidales
- Family: Elaeocarpaceae
- Genus: Elaeocarpus
- Species: E. sericopetalus

Binomial name
- Elaeocarpus sericopetalus F.Muell.

Species of tree endemic to Queensland

Elaeocarpus sericopetalus, commonly known as hard quandong, blueberry ash, hard duandong or northern quandong, is a species of flowering plant in the family Elaeocarpaceae and is endemic to Queensland. It is a tree, sometimes with buttress roots at the base of the trunk, relatively large lenticels, oblong to elliptic leaves, creamy-white flowers with five petals, and deep red to almost black fruit.

== Description ==
Elaeocarpus sericopetalus is a tree that typically grows to a height of 7–30 m (23–98 ft), sometimes with buttress roots and with relatively large lenticels. The leaves are more or less clustered near the ends of the branchlets, oblong to elliptic, 60–80 mm (2.4–3.1 in) long and 15–30 mm (0.59–1.18 in) wide on a petiole 10–25 mm (0.39–0.98 in) long. The flowers are creamy-white, borne in groups of up to eight on a rachis up to 40 mm (1.6 in) long, each flower on a pedicel 3–5 mm (0.12–0.20 in) long. The flowers have five egg-shaped sepals 4–4.5 mm (0.16–0.18 in) long and 1–1.5 mm (0.039–0.059 in) wide. The five petals are oblong, slightly longer than, but narrower than the sepals, sometimes with two or three notches on the end and there are about fifty stamens. Flowering mainly in December and the fruit is a deep red to almost black drupe about 12–13 mm (0.47–0.51 in) long and 10–11 mm (0.39–0.43 in) wide.

== Taxonomy ==
Elaeocarpus sericopetalus was first formally described in 1878 by Ferdinand von Mueller in Fragmenta Phytographiae Australiae from material collected by John Dallachy near Rockingham Bay.

== Distribution and habitat ==
This quandong grows in rainforest at altitudes between 200 and 1,300 m (660 and 4,270 ft) from north-eastern Queensland to near Townsville in central-eastern Queensland.

== Conservation status ==
Hard quandong is listed as of "least concern" under the Queensland Government Nature Conservation Act 1992.
