= Elaeocarpus johnsonii =

Kuranda quandong

Scientific classification
- Kingdom: Plantae
- Clade: Tracheophytes
- Clade: Angiosperms
- Clade: Eudicots
- Clade: Rosids
- Order: Oxalidales
- Family: Elaeocarpaceae
- Genus: Elaeocarpus
- Species: E. johnsonii

Binomial name
- Elaeocarpus johnsonii F.Muell.

Species of flowering plant endemic to Queensland

Elaeocarpus johnsonii, commonly known as Kuranda quandong or Johnson's quandong, is species of flowering plant in the family Elaeocarpaceae and is endemic to north-east Queensland. It is a small to medium-sized tree, often with several main stems, elliptic to egg-shaped leaves with the narrower end towards the base, racemes of up to seven flowers, the petals with fringed lobes, and dark blue fruit.

== Description ==
Elaeocarpus johnsonii is a small to medium-sized tree typically growing to a height of 20 m (66 ft), often with several buttressed trunks. Young branchlets are densely covered with woolly-brownish or velvety hairs. The leaves are mostly clustered at the ends of branchlets, hairy, elliptic to egg-shaped with the narrower end towards the base, mostly 100–160 mm (3.9–6.3 in) long and 55–80 mm (2.2–3.1 in) wide on a petiole 2–3 mm (0.079–0.118 in) long. The flowers are arranged in racemes 10–30 mm (0.39–1.18 in) long with up to seven flowers on robust pedicels 15–25 mm (0.59–0.98 in) long. The flowers have five narrow triangular sepals about 16 mm (0.63 in) and 4 mm (0.16 in) wide, densely hairy on the back. The five petals are about 18 mm (0.71 in) long and 6 mm (0.24 in) wide, the tips divided into two or three fringed lobes. There are between thirty and thirty-five stamens. Flowering occurs in September and the fruit is a dark blue drupe with a waxy bloom and 27–30 mm (1.1–1.2 in) long.

== Taxonomy ==
Elaeocarpus johnsonii was first formally described in 1893 by Ferdinand von Mueller in the Journal of Botany, British and Foreign.

The authorship of E. johnsonii is attributed to "F.Muell. ex C.T.White" by Plants of the World Online because White noted that he had been unable to find the place of publication.

== Distribution and habitat ==
Kuranda quandong grows in rainforest at altitudes from 600 to 1,300 m (2,000 to 4,300 ft) and is restricted to Thornton Peak, Mount Pieter Botte and Mount Bartle Frere, and adjacent areas in north-east Queensland.

== Ecology ==
Cassowaries eat fallen fruit of E. johnsonii and native rats eats the seeds.

== Conservation status ==
This quandong is listed as of "least concern" under the Queensland Government Nature Conservation Act 1992.
