= Elaeocarpus ruminatus =

Scientific classification
- Kingdom: Plantae
- Clade: Tracheophytes
- Clade: Angiosperms
- Clade: Eudicots
- Clade: Rosids
- Order: Oxalidales
- Family: Elaeocarpaceae
- Genus: Elaeocarpus
- Species: E. ruminatus

Binomial name
- Elaeocarpus ruminatus F.Muell.

Species of tree endemic to Queensland

Elaeocarpus ruminatus, commonly known as brown quandong, caloon or grey quandong, is a species of flowering plant in the family Elaeocarpaceae and is endemic to Queensland. It is a tree with buttress roots at the base of the trunk, mostly more or less elliptic leaves, cream-coloured flowers with five petals that sometimes have a divided tip, and more or less spherical fruit.

== Description ==
Elaeocarpus ruminatus is a tree that typically grows to a height of 20–40 m (66–131 ft) and has buttress roots at the base of the trunk. The leaves are more or less clustered near the ends of the branchlets, mostly more or less elliptic, 50–120 mm (2.0–4.7 in) long and 25–45 mm (0.98–1.77 in) wide on a petiole 20–45 mm (0.79–1.77 in) long. The flowers are borne in groups of up to twenty-five on a thin rachis 30–100 mm (1.2–3.9 in) long, each flower on a pedicel 3–6 mm (0.12–0.24 in) long. The flowers are cream-coloured and have five narrow egg-shaped sepals 5–6 mm (0.20–0.24 in) long and 1.5–2 mm (0.059–0.079 in) wide. The five petals are egg-shaped, the same length as, or shorter than the sepals, 4.5–5 mm (0.18–0.20 in) long and 1.5–2 mm (0.059–0.079 in) wide, the tip sometimes with one or two narrow triangular lobes. There are sixteen to twenty-two stamens and the ovary is covered with short, felted hairs. Flowering mainly occurs from November to February and the fruit is a more or less spherical drupe about 12 mm (0.47 in) in diameter.

== Taxonomy ==
Elaeocarpus ruminatus was first formally described in 1872 by Ferdinand von Mueller in Fragmenta Phytographiae Australiae from material collected by John Dallachy near Rockingham Bay.

== Distribution and habitat ==
Elaeocarpus ruminatus is widespread in rainforest at altitudes between 600 and 1,100 m (2,000 and 3,600 ft) in north-eastern and central-eastern Queensland.

== Conservation status ==
Brown quandong is listed as of "least concern" under the Queensland Government Nature Conservation Act 1992.
