= IUCN Red List conservation dependent species =

A visualization of the categories in the no-longer used "IUCN 1994 Categories & Criteria (version 2.3)", with conservation dependent (LR/cd) highlighted. The category was folded into the near threatened (NT) category in the 2001 revision, but some species which have not been re-evaluated retain the assessment.

As of July 2016, the International Union for Conservation of Nature (IUCN) listed 238 conservation dependent species. That was 0.29% of all evaluated species listed at the time. The IUCN also listed seven subspecies and five varieties as conservation dependent.

As of the 2024.2 version of the Red List, the IUCN lists 125 conservation dependent species, seven plant subspecies and five plant varieties as having been assessed as conservation dependent.

The conservation dependent category is part of the IUCN 1994 Categories & Criteria (version 2.3), which is no longer used in evaluation of taxa, but which persists in the IUCN Red List for taxa evaluated prior to 2001, when version 3.1 was first used. Using the 2001 (v3.1) system these taxa are classed as near threatened, but those that have not been re-evaluated remain with the conservation dependent category.

This is a complete list of conservation dependent species and subspecies evaluated by the IUCN. Species and subspecies which have conservation dependent subpopulations are also indicated. However, as updated versions of the IUCN Red List are released, this list will need to be updated to match the most current version.

== Plants ==
As of version 2024.2, there are 112 species, seven subspecies, and five varieties of plant assessed as conservation dependent.

=== Dicotyledons ===
As of version 2024.2, there are 105 species, seven subspecies, and three varieties of dicotyledon assessed as conservation dependent.

==== Apiales ====
- Apiopetalum velutinum
- Aralia wangshanensis
- Gamblea malayana
- Pittosporum turneri, Turner's kohuhu
- Polyscias montana

==== Aquifoliales ====
- Ilex grandiflora
- Ilex illustris
- Ilex patens
- Ilex sclerophylla
- Ilex tahanensis

==== Ericales ====
- Adinandra angulata
- Adinandra parvifolia
- Chrysophyllum flexuosum
- Chrysophyllum inornatum
- Clethra hendersonii
- Diospyros johorensis
- Madhuca penangiana
- Madhuca tubulosa
- Manilkara paraensis
- Manilkara subsericea
- Micropholis crassipedicellata
- Micropholis williamii
- Payena selangorica
- Pouteria altissima
- Pouteria beaurepairei
- Pouteria retinervis
- Rhododendron fictolacteum
- Symplocos pyriflora
- Ternstroemia evenia
- Ternstroemia maclellandiana

Subspecies

- Chrysophyllum lucentifolium subsp. lucentifolium
- Erica scoparia subsp. platycodon

Varieties

- Isonandra perakensis var. perakensis

==== Fabales ====
- Archidendron pahangense
- Inga megalobotrys
- Inga porcata
- Ormosia gracilis
- Serianthes petitiana
- Strombocarpa tamarugo
- Xanthophyllum monticolum
- Xanthophyllum pubescens

Subspecies

- Leucaena leucocephala subsp. ixtahuacana

==== Fagales ====
- Lithocarpus kingianus
- Lithocarpus kunstleri

Subspecies

- Quercus petraea subsp. huguetiana

==== Magnoliales ====
- Cyathocalyx scortechinii
- Knema losirensis
- Knema oblongifolia

Subspecies

- Horsfieldia subalpina subsp. kinabaluensis

==== Malpighiales ====
- Antidesma cruciforme
- Balanops balansae
- Drypetes cockburnii
- Garcinia diversifolia
- Garcinia eugeniaefolia
- Garcinia hermonii
- Kayea rosea
- Lasiochlamys trichostemona
- Koilodepas wallichianum
- Macaranga quadricornis
- Phyllanthus watsonii
- Rawsonia reticulata
- Ryparosa scortechinii
- Trigonostemon rufescens

==== Malvales ====
- Cola semecarpophylla
- Cullenia rosayroana
- Peddiea kivuensis
- Pentace excelsa
- Pentace grandiflora
- Pentace strychnoidea
- Schoutenia furfuracea

==== Myrtales ====
- Eugenia orites
- Eugenia pahangensis
- Eugenia pearsoniana
- Eugenia tahanensis
- Eugenia tecta
- Eugenia tekuensis
- Eugenia watsoniana
- Memecylon corticosum
- Tristaniopsis razakiana

Varieties

- Memecylon acuminatum var. acuminatum

==== Oxalidales ====
- Elaeocarpus cruciatus
- Elaeocarpus glabrescens
- Elaeocarpus nanus
- Elaeocarpus pseudopaniculatus
- Elaeocarpus reticosus
- Elaeocarpus sallehiana
- Elaeocarpus symingtonii

Subspecies

- Elaeocarpus submonoceras subsp. collinus

==== Rosales ====
- Cotoneaster granatensis
- Prunus kinabaluensis

Subspecies

- Sorbus austriaca subsp. croatica

==== Sapindales ====
- Canarium pseudosumatranum
- Canarium reniforme
- Dacryodes kingii
- Glycosmis decipiens
- Guarea venenata
- Terminthodia viridiflora
- Toxicodendron delavayi
- Trichilia lecointei

==== Austrobaileyales ====
- Illicium peninsulare
- Illicium tenuifolium

==== Caryophyllales ====
- Calandrinia galapagosa, Galapagos rock-purslane
- Nepenthes hispida

==== Gentianales ====
- Lasianthus oliganthus
- Tabernaemontana gamblei

==== Lamiales ====
- Chionanthus caudifolius
- Chionanthus lancifolius

==== Proteales ====
- Heliciopsis montana
- Heliciopsis whitmorei

==== Solanales ====
- Athenaea fasciculata
- Solanum inaequale

==== Laurales ====
- Nothaphoebe pahangensis

==== Cornales ====
Varieties

- Davidia involucrata var. involucrata

=== Monocotyledons ===
As of version 2024.2, there are seven species and two varieties of monocotyledon assessed as conservation dependent.

==== Arecales ====
- Livistona alfredii, millstream palm
- Livistona tahanensis
- Phytelephas seemannii, Panama ivory palm
- Rhopaloblaste singaporensis
- Rhopalostylis sapida, nikau
- Veitchia metiti
- Wodyetia bifurcata, foxtail palm

Varieties

- Rhopalostylis baueri var. baueri
- Rhopalostylis baueri var. cheesemanii

== Animals ==
As of version 2025.2, there are 12 arthropod species and one reptile species assessed as conservation dependent.

=== Arthropods ===
==== Branchiopoda ====
- Artemia monica, Mono Lake brine shrimp

==== Insecta ====
- Neonemobius eurynotus, California ground cricket
- Spaniacris deserticola, Coachella Valley grasshopper
- Stenopelmatus nigrocapitatus, Black-headed Jerusalem Cricket

==== Hexanauplia ====
- Attheyella yemanjae
- Canthocamptus campaneri
- Metacyclops campestris
- Murunducaris juneae
- Muscocyclops bidentatus
- Muscocyclops therasiae
- Ponticyclops boscoi
- Thermocyclops parvus

=== Reptiles ===
- Podocnemis expansa, Arrau turtle

== See also ==
- Lists of IUCN Red List near threatened species
