= Syzygium orites =

Conservation status
- Conservation Dependent (IUCN 2.3)

Scientific classification
- Kingdom: Plantae
- Clade: Tracheophytes
- Clade: Angiosperms
- Clade: Eudicots
- Clade: Rosids
- Order: Myrtales
- Family: Myrtaceae
- Genus: Syzygium
- Species: S. orites

Binomial name
- Syzygium orites (Ridl.) I.M.Turner

Synonyms
- Eugenia orites Ridl.

Species of tree

Syzygium orites is a species of flowering plant in the family Myrtaceae, the myrtles. It is a tree endemic to Peninsular Malaysia. It is threatened by habitat loss.
