= Syzygium tahanense =

Conservation status
- Least Concern (IUCN 2.3)

Scientific classification
- Kingdom: Plantae
- Clade: Tracheophytes
- Clade: Angiosperms
- Clade: Eudicots
- Clade: Rosids
- Order: Myrtales
- Family: Myrtaceae
- Genus: Syzygium
- Species: S. tahanense

Binomial name
- Syzygium tahanense (Ridley) I.M.Turner

Species of tree

Syzygium tahanense is a species of plant in the family Myrtaceae. It is a tree endemic to Peninsular Malaysia. Some populations are protected in Taman Negara.
