= Syzygium porphyranthum =

Conservation status
- Vulnerable (IUCN 2.3)

Scientific classification
- Kingdom: Plantae
- Clade: Tracheophytes
- Clade: Angiosperms
- Clade: Eudicots
- Clade: Rosids
- Order: Myrtales
- Family: Myrtaceae
- Genus: Syzygium
- Species: S. porphyranthum

Binomial name
- Syzygium porphyranthum (Ridl.) I.M.Turner

Synonyms
- Eugenia porphyrantha Ridl.

Species of tree

Syzygium porphyranthum is a species of flowering plant in the family Myrtaceae. It is a tree endemic to Peninsular Malaysia. It grows in lowland and hill rain forest.

The species was first described as Eugenia porphyrantha by Henry Nicholas Ridley in 1912. In 1997 Ian Mark Turner placed the species in genus Syzygium as S. porphyranthum.
