= Syzygium tekuense =

Conservation status
- Conservation Dependent (IUCN 2.3)

Scientific classification
- Kingdom: Plantae
- Clade: Tracheophytes
- Clade: Angiosperms
- Clade: Eudicots
- Clade: Rosids
- Order: Myrtales
- Family: Myrtaceae
- Genus: Syzygium
- Species: S. tekuense

Binomial name
- Syzygium tekuense (M.R.Hend.) I.M.Turner

Synonyms
- Eugenia tekuensis M.R.Hend.; Eugenia trunciflora Ridl., nom. illeg. homonym. post.; Syzygium trunciflorum Airy Shaw

Species of tree

Syzygium tekuense is a species of flowering plant in the family Myrtaceae. It is a tree endemic to Peninsular Malaysia, where it is known only from Pahang.
