= Tetractomia majus =

Conservation status
- Conservation Dependent (IUCN 2.3)

Scientific classification
- Kingdom: Plantae
- Clade: Tracheophytes
- Clade: Angiosperms
- Clade: Eudicots
- Clade: Rosids
- Order: Sapindales
- Family: Rutaceae
- Genus: Tetractomia
- Species: T. majus

Binomial name
- Tetractomia majus Hook. f.

Species of tree

Tetractomia majus is a species of plant in the Rutaceae (Rue or Citrus) family. It is a tree endemic to Peninsular Malaysia. It is threatened by habitat loss.
