= Schoutenia kunstleri =

Conservation status
- Least Concern (IUCN 3.1)

Scientific classification
- Kingdom: Plantae
- Clade: Tracheophytes
- Clade: Angiosperms
- Clade: Eudicots
- Clade: Rosids
- Order: Malvales
- Family: Malvaceae
- Genus: Schoutenia
- Species: S. kunstleri

Binomial name
- Schoutenia kunstleri King

Synonyms
- Actinophora buurmanni (Koord. & Valeton) Koord.; Schoutenia buurmanni Koord. & Valeton

Species of tree

Schoutenia kunstleri is a species of flowering plant in the family Malvaceae. It is a tree endemic to Peninsular Malaysia.
