= Syzygium setosum =

Conservation status
- Endangered (IUCN 3.1)

Scientific classification
- Kingdom: Plantae
- Clade: Tracheophytes
- Clade: Angiosperms
- Clade: Eudicots
- Clade: Rosids
- Order: Myrtales
- Family: Myrtaceae
- Genus: Syzygium
- Species: S. setosum

Binomial name
- Syzygium setosum (King) I.M.Turner

Synonyms
- Eugenia setosa King

Species of tree

Syzygium setosum is a species of flowering plant in the family Myrtaceae. It is a tree native to western Peninsular Malaysia and eastern Sumatra. It is a small tree, up to 10 m tall, which grows in lowland peat swamp forest up to 90 metres elevation. It is threatened by habitat loss.
