= Syzygium swettenhamianum =

Conservation status
- Vulnerable (IUCN 2.3)

Scientific classification
- Kingdom: Plantae
- Clade: Tracheophytes
- Clade: Angiosperms
- Clade: Eudicots
- Clade: Rosids
- Order: Myrtales
- Family: Myrtaceae
- Genus: Syzygium
- Species: S. swettenhamianum

Binomial name
- Syzygium swettenhamianum (King) I.M.Turner

Synonyms
- Eugenia swettenhamiana King

Species of tree

Syzygium swettenhamianum is a species of flowering plant in the family Myrtaceae. It is a tree endemic to Peninsular Malaysia. It is known from a collection in Gunung Pondok, Perak, where it grows in lowland rain forest. It is threatened by habitat loss.

The species was first described as Eugenia swettenhamiana by George King in 1901. In 1997 Ian Mark Turner placed the species in genus Syzygium as S. swettenhamianum.
