= Heliciopsis artocarpoides =

Conservation status
- Least Concern (IUCN 3.1)

Scientific classification
- Kingdom: Plantae
- Clade: Tracheophytes
- Clade: Angiosperms
- Clade: Eudicots
- Order: Proteales
- Family: Proteaceae
- Genus: Heliciopsis
- Species: H. artocarpoides

Binomial name
- Heliciopsis artocarpoides (Elmer) Sleumer

Synonyms
- Helicia artocarpoides Elmer

Species of flowering plant

Heliciopsis artocarpoides, also known as kurunggu or putat, is a species of flowering plant, a tropical forest fruit-tree in the macadamia family, that is native to Southeast Asia.

== Description ==
The species grows as a small tree to 5–15 m in height, with short, often crooked, bole and low branches. The smooth, deeply lobed leaves are 40–90 cm long by 30–40 cm wide. The inflorescences, comprising racemes of fragrant, white to yellowish flowers occur on the trunk and along the branches. The fruits appear as clusters of cylindrical or oval drupes, 3–4 cm long by 2–3 cm in diameter, purple when immature and ripening green to yellow, with an edible mesocarp.

== Distribution and habitat ==
The species is found in Borneo and the Philippines, where it occurs in lowland and hill mixed dipterocarp forest, as well as in lower montane forest up to an elevation of 1,600 m. It is not known to be cultivated; the fruits are collected wild from the forest.
