= Muscocyclops =

Scientific classification
- Kingdom: Animalia
- Phylum: Arthropoda
- Clade: Pancrustacea
- Class: Copepoda
- Order: Cyclopoida
- Family: Cyclopidae
- Genus: Muscocyclops; Kiefer, 1937

Genus of crustaceans

Muscocyclops is a genus of copepod crustaceans in the family Cyclopidae, comprising three species found only in South America. Two of the species – Muscocyclops bidentatus and Muscocyclops therasiae – are endemic to the Distrito Federal in Brazil, and are listed as conservation dependent on the IUCN Red List. The third species is Muscocyclops operculatus.
