= Syzygium quadratum =

Conservation status
- Vulnerable (IUCN 2.3)

Scientific classification
- Kingdom: Plantae
- Clade: Tracheophytes
- Clade: Angiosperms
- Clade: Eudicots
- Clade: Rosids
- Order: Myrtales
- Family: Myrtaceae
- Genus: Syzygium
- Species: S. quadratum

Binomial name
- Syzygium quadratum (King) I.M.Turner

Synonyms
- Eugenia quadrata King

Species of tree

Syzygium quadratum is a species of flowering plant in the family Myrtaceae. It is a tree endemic to Peninsular Malaysia. It is known only from Bukit Larut in the state of Perak. It is threatened by habitat loss, including from resort development.

The species was first described as Eugenia quadrata by George King in 1901. In 1997 Ian Mark Turner placed the species in genus Syzygium as S. quadratum.
