= Syzygium watsonianum =

Conservation status
- Conservation Dependent (IUCN 2.3)

Scientific classification
- Kingdom: Plantae
- Clade: Tracheophytes
- Clade: Angiosperms
- Clade: Eudicots
- Clade: Rosids
- Order: Myrtales
- Family: Myrtaceae
- Genus: Syzygium
- Species: S. watsonianum

Binomial name
- Syzygium watsonianum (M.R.Hend.) I.M.Turner

Synonyms
- Eugenia watsoniana M.R.Hend.; Stereocaryum watsonianum (M.R.Hend.) A.J.Scott

Species of tree

Syzygium watsonianum is a species of flowering plant in the family Myrtaceae. It is a tree endemic to Peninsular Malaysia. It is threatened by habitat loss.

The species was first described as Eugenia watsoniana by M. R. Henderson in 1947. In 1997 Ian Mark Turner placed the species in genus Syzygium as S. watsonianum.
