= Syzygium pahangense =

Conservation status
- Conservation Dependent (IUCN 2.3)

Scientific classification
- Kingdom: Plantae
- Clade: Tracheophytes
- Clade: Angiosperms
- Clade: Eudicots
- Clade: Rosids
- Order: Myrtales
- Family: Myrtaceae
- Genus: Syzygium
- Species: S. pahangense

Binomial name
- Syzygium pahangense (Ridl.) I.M.Turner

Synonyms
- Eugenia pahangensis Ridl.; Eugenia pahangensis var. fraseri M.R.Hend.; Syzygium pahangense var. fraseri (M.R.Hend.) I.M.Turner

Species of tree

Syzygium pahangense is a species of flowering plant in the family Myrtaceae. It is a tree endemic to Peninsular Malaysia. Some populations are protected in Taman Negara.
