= Syzygium burkillianum =

Conservation status
- Vulnerable (IUCN 2.3)

Scientific classification
- Kingdom: Plantae
- Clade: Tracheophytes
- Clade: Angiosperms
- Clade: Eudicots
- Clade: Rosids
- Order: Myrtales
- Family: Myrtaceae
- Genus: Syzygium
- Species: S. burkillianum

Binomial name
- Syzygium burkillianum (King) I.M.Turner

Synonyms
- Eugenia burkilliana King

Species of tree

Syzygium burkillianum is a species of flowering plant in the family Myrtaceae. It is a tree endemic to Peninsular Malaysia. It is known only from Perak, where it grows in lowland rain forest. It is threatened by habitat loss.

The species was first described as Eugenia burkilliana by George King in 1901. In 1997 Ian Mark Turner placed the species in genus Syzygium as S. burkillianum.
