= Syzygium cyrtophylloides =

Conservation status
- Vulnerable (IUCN 2.3)

Scientific classification
- Kingdom: Plantae
- Clade: Tracheophytes
- Clade: Angiosperms
- Clade: Eudicots
- Clade: Rosids
- Order: Myrtales
- Family: Myrtaceae
- Genus: Syzygium
- Species: S. cyrtophylloides

Binomial name
- Syzygium cyrtophylloides (Ridl.) I.M.Turner

Synonyms
- Eugenia cyrtophylloides Ridl.

Species of flowering plant

Syzygium cyrtophylloides is a species of flowering plant in the family Myrtaceae. It is a tree endemic to Peninsular Malaysia. It is known from a single collection from Gunung Tahan within Taman Negara National Park in Pahang, but is thought to be locally common at the collection site. The IUCN Red List assesses the species as Vulnerable.

The species was first described as Eugenia cyrtophylloides by Henry Nicholas Ridley in 1918. In 1997 Ian Mark Turner placed the species in genus Syzygium as S. cyrtophylloides.
