= Syzygium tectum =

Conservation status
- Conservation Dependent (IUCN 2.3)

Scientific classification
- Kingdom: Plantae
- Clade: Tracheophytes
- Clade: Angiosperms
- Clade: Eudicots
- Clade: Rosids
- Order: Myrtales
- Family: Myrtaceae
- Genus: Syzygium
- Species: S. tectum

Binomial name
- Syzygium tectum (King) I.M.Turner

Synonyms
- Eugenia tecta King

Species of tree

Syzygium tectum is a species of flowering plant in the family Myrtaceae. It is a tree endemic to Peninsular Malaysia. It is threatened by habitat loss.
