= Syzygium pallidulum =

Conservation status
- Vulnerable (IUCN 2.3)

Scientific classification
- Kingdom: Plantae
- Clade: Tracheophytes
- Clade: Angiosperms
- Clade: Eudicots
- Clade: Rosids
- Order: Myrtales
- Family: Myrtaceae
- Genus: Syzygium
- Species: S. pallidulum

Binomial name
- Syzygium pallidulum (Ridl.) I.M.Turner

Synonyms
- Eugenia pallidula Ridl.

Species of tree

Syzygium pallidulum is a species of flowering plant in the family Myrtaceae. It is a tree endemic to Peninsular Malaysia. It is known from the states of Perak and Pahang, with subpopulations in Pondok Tanjong Forest Reserve in Perak and on the banks of the Semarang River near Temerloh, Pahang. It grows in lowland rain forest. It is threatened by habitat loss, and the IUCN Red List assesses the species as Vulnerable.

The species was first described as Eugenia pallidula by Henry Nicholas Ridley in 1922. In 1997 Ian Mark Turner placed the species in genus Syzygium as S. pallidulum.
