= Lower risk =

Former IUCN Red List category

v2.3 of the IUCN Red List categories, circa 1994–2000, which included the "Lower Risk" classification.

Lower risk was a classification formerly used by the IUCN Red List, which is still found in some older assessments. It has been superseded by the Least Concern and Near Threatened classifications. Species are classified into one of nine Red List Categories: extinct, extinct in the wild, critically endangered, endangered, vulnerable, near threatened, least concern, data deficient, and not evaluated.

The IUCN defined an animal with the conservation status of lower risk is one with populations levels high enough to ensure its survival. Animals with this status did not qualify as being threatened or extinct. However, natural disasters or certain human activities would cause them to change to either of these classifications.

When it was in use, this classification was sub-divided into three categories:

- Conservation dependent (LR/cd) - where cessation of current conservation measures may result in it being classified at a higher risk level.
- Near threatened (LR/nt) - may become vulnerable to endangerment in the near future but not meeting the criteria.
- Least concern (LR/nt) - where neither of the two above apply.

In the current version of the IUCN Red List Categories and Criteria, version 3.1, used since 2001, the conservation dependent (LR/cd) assessment was removed. In the new version, species which would have been assessed as conservation dependent are assessed as near threatened (NT). However, until a new assessment is made species keep their original v2.3 status, so some species which have not been reassessed retain a conservation dependent (LR/cd) status.

Assessments of species which are currently assigned any of the Lower Risk conservation status are now all flagged as "out of date", which is displayed as a "Needs updating" annotation on the Red List website. This indicates a reassessment has not been made in over 10 years for the species, exceeding the maximum time span between reassessments aimed for by the IUCN.

The IUCN Green Status, formalized in 2020, reintroduced an assessment of conservation dependence, with a metric assessed separately to the Red List category.

== See also ==
- Biodiversity action plan
- Endangered species
