= Syzygium perryae =

Conservation status
- Vulnerable (IUCN 2.3)

Scientific classification
- Kingdom: Plantae
- Clade: Tracheophytes
- Clade: Angiosperms
- Clade: Eudicots
- Clade: Rosids
- Order: Myrtales
- Family: Myrtaceae
- Genus: Syzygium
- Species: S. perryae

Binomial name
- Syzygium perryae I.M.Turner

Synonyms
- Eugenia benjamina King

Species of tree

Syzygium perryae is a species of flowering plant in the family Myrtaceae. It is a shrub native to Peninsular Malaysia and Sumatra. It is threatened by habitat loss. The IUCN Red List assesses the species as Vulnerable under the synonym Eugenia benjamina.
