= Peddiea kivuensis =

Conservation status
- Conservation Dependent (IUCN 2.3)

Scientific classification
- Kingdom: Plantae
- Clade: Tracheophytes
- Clade: Angiosperms
- Clade: Eudicots
- Clade: Rosids
- Order: Malvales
- Family: Thymelaeaceae
- Genus: Peddiea
- Species: P. kivuensis

Binomial name
- Peddiea kivuensis Robyns

Species of flowering plant

Peddiea kivuensis is a species of plant in the family Thymelaeaceae. It is endemic to the Democratic Republic of the Congo. It is threatened by habitat loss.
