= Schoutenia cornerii =

Conservation status
- Endangered (IUCN 2.3)

Scientific classification
- Kingdom: Plantae
- Clade: Tracheophytes
- Clade: Angiosperms
- Clade: Eudicots
- Clade: Rosids
- Order: Malvales
- Family: Malvaceae
- Genus: Schoutenia
- Species: S. cornerii

Binomial name
- Schoutenia cornerii Roek.

Species of tree

Schoutenia cornerii is a species of plant in the family Malvaceae. It is a tree endemic to Peninsular Malaysia.
