= Serianthes margaretae =

Conservation status
- Endangered (IUCN 3.1)

Scientific classification
- Kingdom: Plantae
- Clade: Tracheophytes
- Clade: Angiosperms
- Clade: Eudicots
- Clade: Rosids
- Order: Fabales
- Family: Fabaceae
- Subfamily: Caesalpinioideae
- Clade: Mimosoid clade
- Genus: Serianthes
- Species: S. margaretae

Binomial name
- Serianthes margaretae Nielsen

Species of legume

Serianthes margaretae is a species of flowering plant in the family Fabaceae. It is found only in New Caledonia.
