= Garcinia diversifolia =

Conservation status
- Conservation Dependent (IUCN 2.3)

Scientific classification
- Kingdom: Plantae
- Clade: Tracheophytes
- Clade: Angiosperms
- Clade: Eudicots
- Clade: Rosids
- Order: Malpighiales
- Family: Clusiaceae
- Genus: Garcinia
- Species: G. diversifolia

Binomial name
- Garcinia diversifolia King

Species of tree

Garcinia diversifolia is a species of flowering plant in the family Clusiaceae. It is a tree endemic to Peninsular Malaysia.
