= Payena selangorica =

Conservation status
- Conservation Dependent (IUCN 2.3)

Scientific classification
- Kingdom: Plantae
- Clade: Tracheophytes
- Clade: Angiosperms
- Clade: Eudicots
- Clade: Asterids
- Order: Ericales
- Family: Sapotaceae
- Genus: Payena
- Species: P. selangorica

Binomial name
- Payena selangorica King & Gamble

Synonyms
- Madhuca selangorica (King & Gamble) Sincl.

Species of tree

Payena selangorica is a species of plant in the family Sapotaceae. It is a tree endemic to Peninsular Malaysia. It is threatened by habitat loss.
