= Heliciopsis cockburnii =

Conservation status
- Vulnerable (IUCN 2.3)

Scientific classification
- Kingdom: Plantae
- Clade: Embryophytes
- Clade: Tracheophytes
- Clade: Angiosperms
- Clade: Eudicots
- Order: Proteales
- Family: Proteaceae
- Genus: Heliciopsis
- Species: H. cockburnii

Binomial name
- Heliciopsis cockburnii Kochummen

Species of plant endemic to Malaysia

Heliciopsis cockburnii is a species of plant in the family Proteaceae. It is a tree endemic to Peninsular Malaysia. It is threatened by habitat loss.
