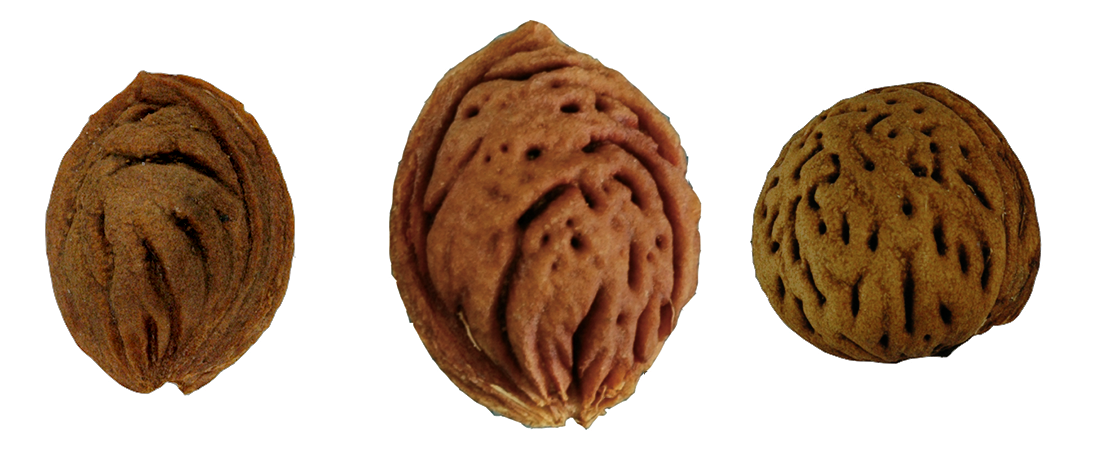

Conservation status
- Conservation Dependent (IUCN 2.3)

Scientific classification
- Kingdom: Plantae
- Clade: Tracheophytes
- Clade: Angiosperms
- Clade: Eudicots
- Clade: Rosids
- Order: Rosales
- Family: Rosaceae
- Genus: Prunus
- Species: P. kinabaluensis

Binomial name
- Prunus kinabaluensis Kalkman

Synonyms
- Pygeum kinabaluense (Kalkm.)

= Prunus kinabaluensis =

Species of plant

Prunus kinabaluensis is a species of flowering plant in the family Rosaceae. It is found in Borneo and the Philippines.
