= Ternstroemia evenia =

Conservation status
- Conservation Dependent (IUCN 2.3)

Scientific classification
- Kingdom: Plantae
- Clade: Tracheophytes
- Clade: Angiosperms
- Clade: Eudicots
- Clade: Asterids
- Order: Ericales
- Family: Pentaphylacaceae
- Genus: Ternstroemia
- Species: T. evenia

Binomial name
- Ternstroemia evenia (King) A.C.Sm.

Synonyms
- Illicium evenium King

Species of tree

Ternstroemia evenia is a species of tree in the family Pentaphylacaceae. It is endemic to Peninsular Malaysia, where it grows in rainforests. It is protected in some areas.
