= Garcinia hermonii =

Conservation status
- Conservation Dependent (IUCN 2.3)

Scientific classification
- Kingdom: Plantae
- Clade: Tracheophytes
- Clade: Angiosperms
- Clade: Eudicots
- Clade: Rosids
- Order: Malpighiales
- Family: Clusiaceae
- Genus: Garcinia
- Species: G. hermonii

Binomial name
- Garcinia hermonii Kosterm.

Species of flowering plant

Garcinia hermonii is a species of flowering plant in the family Clusiaceae. It is found only in Sri Lanka where it is known as මඩොල් (madol) in Sinhala.
