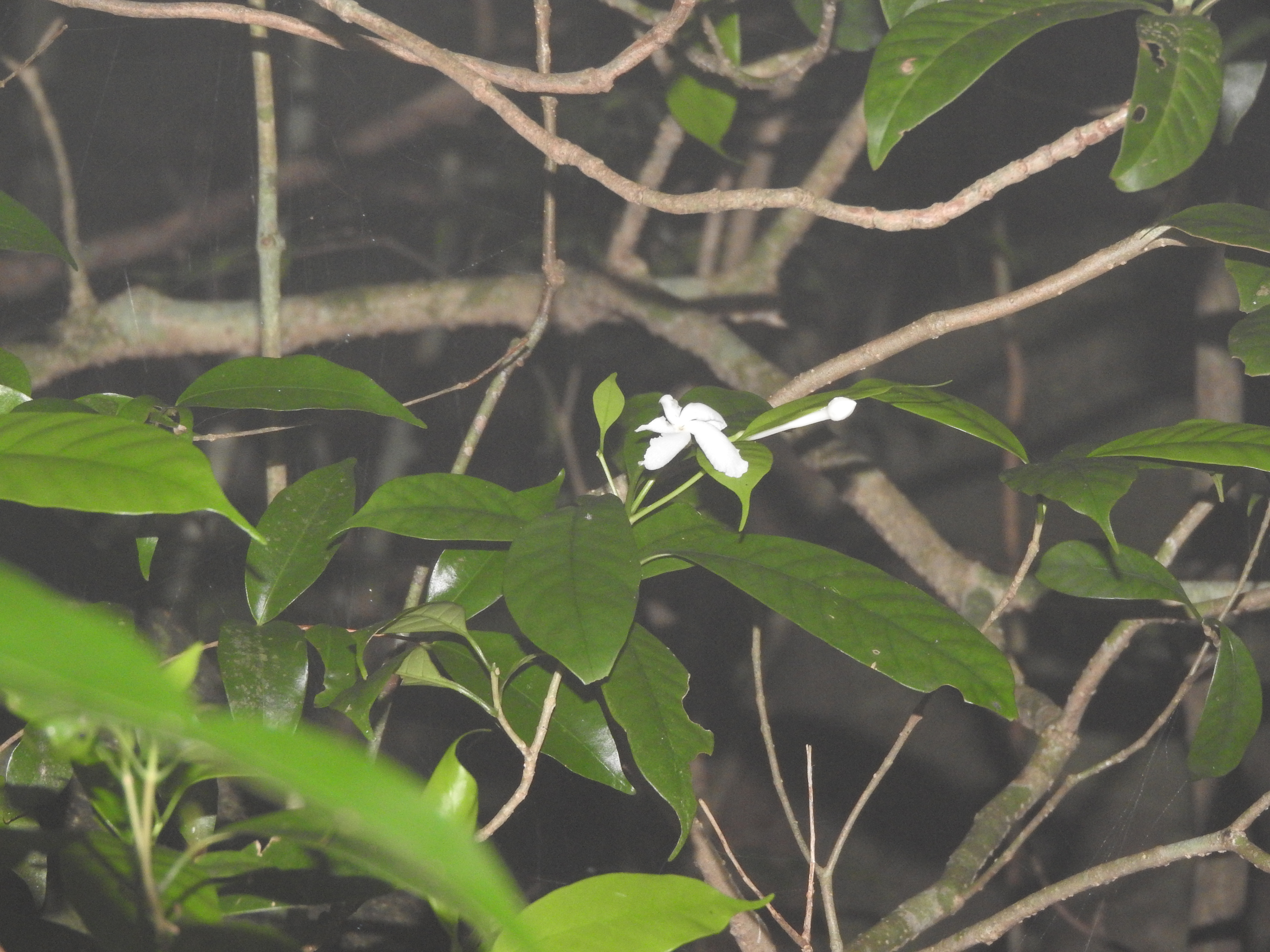

Conservation status
- Conservation Dependent (IUCN 2.3)

Scientific classification
- Kingdom: Plantae
- Clade: Tracheophytes
- Clade: Angiosperms
- Clade: Eudicots
- Clade: Asterids
- Order: Gentianales
- Family: Apocynaceae
- Genus: Tabernaemontana
- Species: T. gamblei

Binomial name
- Tabernaemontana gamblei Subramanyam & A.N.Henry

= Tabernaemontana gamblei =

Species of plant

Tabernaemontana gamblei is a species of plant in the family Apocynaceae. It is endemic to India.
