= Lithocarpus kingianus =

Conservation status
- Conservation Dependent (IUCN 2.3)

Scientific classification
- Kingdom: Plantae
- Clade: Embryophytes
- Clade: Tracheophytes
- Clade: Spermatophytes
- Clade: Angiosperms
- Clade: Eudicots
- Clade: Rosids
- Order: Fagales
- Family: Fagaceae
- Genus: Lithocarpus
- Species: L. kingianus

Binomial name
- Lithocarpus kingianus (Gamble) A.Camus

Synonyms
- Pasania kingiana Gamble; Synaedrys kingiana (Gamble) Koidz.

Species of tree

Lithocarpus kingianus is a species of plant in the family Fagaceae. It is a tree endemic to Peninsular Malaysia.
