= Heliciopsis =

Scientific classification
- Kingdom: Plantae
- Clade: Embryophytes
- Clade: Tracheophytes
- Clade: Angiosperms
- Clade: Eudicots
- Order: Proteales
- Family: Proteaceae
- Subfamily: Grevilleoideae
- Tribe: Macadamieae
- Subtribe: Virotiinae
- Genus: Heliciopsis; Sleumer

Genus of trees from southeast Asia

Heliciopsis is a genus of about fourteen species of trees, constituting part of the flowering plant family Proteaceae. They grow naturally in Myanmar, Indo-China, China, Thailand, Peninsular Malaysia, Borneo, Sumatra, Java (Indonesia) and the Philippines. The name means similar to the plant genus Helicia. Its closest relatives are Athertonia (Australia) and Virotia (New Caledonia).

== Species ==
It includes the following species:

- Heliciopsis artocarpoides (Elmer) Sleumer
- Heliciopsis cockburnii Kochummen
- Heliciopsis henryi (Diels) W.T.Wang
- Heliciopsis incisa (Koord. & Valeton) Sleumer
- Heliciopsis lanceolata (Koord. & Valeton) Sleumer
- Heliciopsis litseifolia R.C.K.Chung
- Heliciopsis lobata (Merr.) Sleumer
- Heliciopsis mahmudii (P.Chai) R.C.K.Chung
- Heliciopsis montana Sym. ex Kochummen
- Heliciopsis percoriacea R.C.K.Chung
- Heliciopsis rufidula Sleumer
- Heliciopsis terminalis (Kurz) Sleumer
- Heliciopsis velutina (Prain) Sleumer
- Heliciopsis whitmorei Kochummen
