= Ternstroemia maclellandiana =

Conservation status
- Conservation Dependent (IUCN 2.3)

Scientific classification
- Kingdom: Plantae
- Clade: Tracheophytes
- Clade: Angiosperms
- Clade: Eudicots
- Clade: Asterids
- Order: Ericales
- Family: Pentaphylacaceae
- Genus: Ternstroemia
- Species: T. maclellandiana

Binomial name
- Ternstroemia maclellandiana Ridl.

Species of tree

Ternstroemia maclellandiana is a species of plant in the family Pentaphylacaceae. It is a tree endemic to Peninsular Malaysia. It is threatened by habitat loss.
