= Heliciopsis lanceolata =

Conservation status
- Endangered (IUCN 2.3)

Scientific classification
- Kingdom: Plantae
- Clade: Tracheophytes
- Clade: Angiosperms
- Clade: Eudicots
- Order: Proteales
- Family: Proteaceae
- Genus: Heliciopsis
- Species: H. lanceolata

Binomial name
- Heliciopsis lanceolata (Koord. & Valeton) Sleumer

Synonyms
- Helicia lanceolata Koord. & Valeton

Species of plant from Indonesia and Malaysia

Heliciopsis lanceolata is a species of flowering plant in the family Proteaceae. It is a tree endemic to Java, where it is known from around Bogor. It grows in remnant hill rain forests. It is threatened by habitat loss, and the IUCN Red List assesses the species as Endangered.

The species was first described as Helicia lanceolata by Sijfert Hendrik Koorders & Theodoric Valeton in 1899. In 1955 Hermann Otto Sleumer placed the species in genus Heliciopsis as H. lanceolata.
