= Schoutenia furfuracea =

Conservation status
- Conservation Dependent (IUCN 2.3)

Scientific classification
- Kingdom: Plantae
- Clade: Tracheophytes
- Clade: Angiosperms
- Clade: Eudicots
- Clade: Rosids
- Order: Malvales
- Family: Malvaceae
- Genus: Schoutenia
- Species: S. furfuracea

Binomial name
- Schoutenia furfuracea Kochummen

Species of tree

Schoutenia furfuracea is a species of plant in the family Malvaceae. It is a tree endemic to Peninsular Malaysia.
