= Ilex patens =

Conservation status
- Conservation Dependent (IUCN 2.3)

Scientific classification
- Kingdom: Plantae
- Clade: Tracheophytes
- Clade: Angiosperms
- Clade: Eudicots
- Clade: Asterids
- Order: Aquifoliales
- Family: Aquifoliaceae
- Genus: Ilex
- Species: I. patens

Binomial name
- Ilex patens Ridley

Species of holly

Ilex patens is a species of plant in the family Aquifoliaceae. It is endemic to Peninsular Malaysia. It is threatened by habitat loss.
