= Elaeocarpus reticosus =

Conservation status
- Conservation Dependent (IUCN 2.3)

Scientific classification
- Kingdom: Plantae
- Clade: Tracheophytes
- Clade: Angiosperms
- Clade: Eudicots
- Clade: Rosids
- Order: Oxalidales
- Family: Elaeocarpaceae
- Genus: Elaeocarpus
- Species: E. reticosus

Binomial name
- Elaeocarpus reticosus Ridl.

Species of flowering plant endemic to Malaysia

Elaeocarpus reticosus is a species of flowering plant in the Elaeocarpaceae family. It is a tree endemic to Peninsular Malaysia.

It is threatened by habitat loss. Some populations are protected in Taman Negara.
