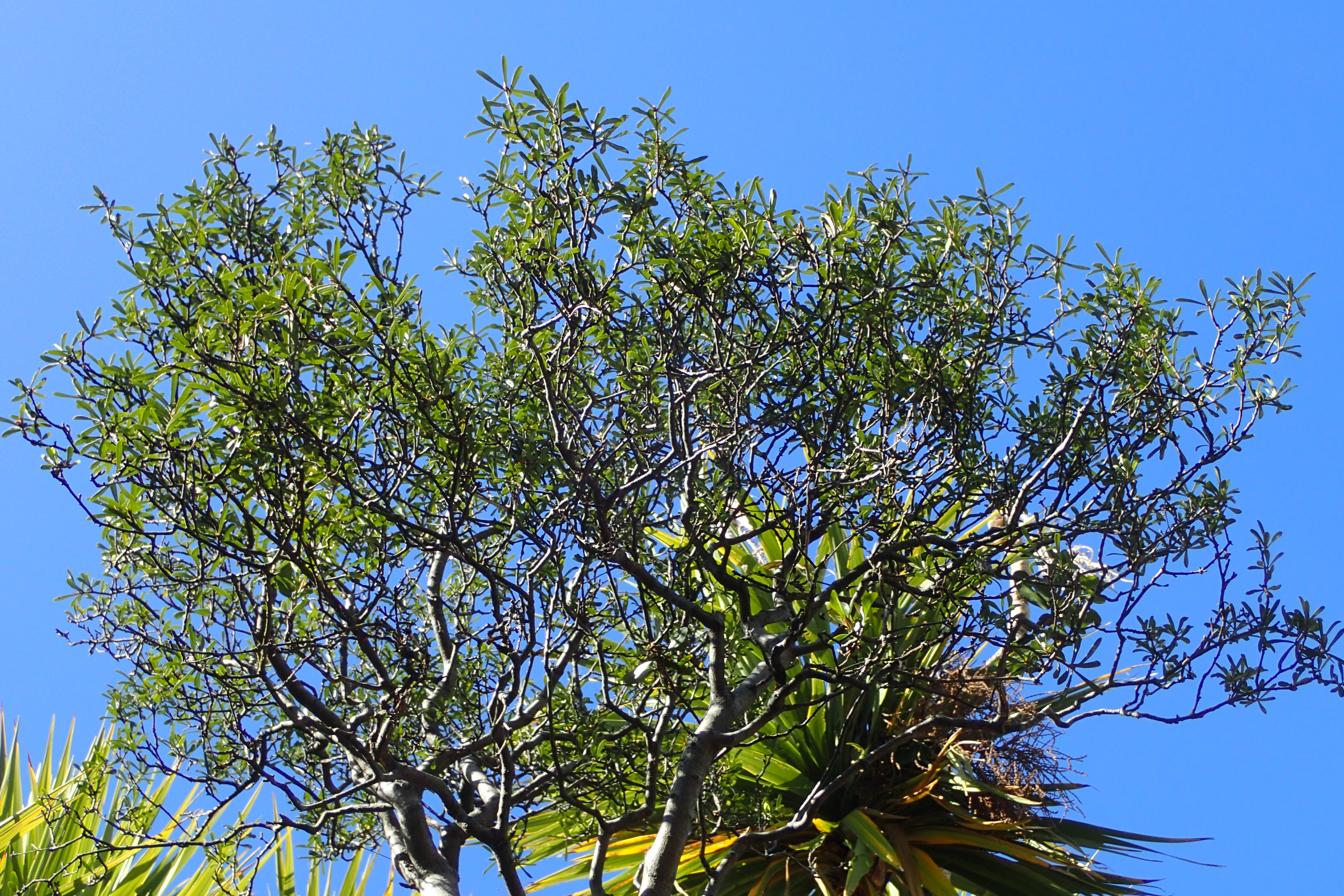

Conservation status
- Conservation Dependent (IUCN 2.3)

Scientific classification
- Kingdom: Plantae
- Clade: Tracheophytes
- Clade: Angiosperms
- Clade: Eudicots
- Clade: Asterids
- Order: Apiales
- Family: Pittosporaceae
- Genus: Pittosporum
- Species: P. turneri

Binomial name
- Pittosporum turneri Petrie

= Pittosporum turneri =

Species of tree

Pittosporum turneri, commonly called Turner's kohuhu or the tent pole tree, is a species of plant in the Pittosporaceae family. It is endemic to New Zealand. P. turneri was first described by Donald Petrie in 1925. The species flowers between the months of October to December. P. turneri is threatened by possums. It is regarded as being Nationally Vulnerable.
