= Tetractomia =

Scientific classification
- Kingdom: Plantae
- Clade: Tracheophytes
- Clade: Angiosperms
- Clade: Eudicots
- Clade: Rosids
- Order: Sapindales
- Family: Rutaceae
- Subfamily: Zanthoxyloideae
- Genus: Tetractomia; Hook.f.

Synonyms
- Terminthodia Ridl.

Genus of plants

Tetractomia is a genus of plants in the family Rutaceae, native to Southeast Asia.

As of December 2023, Plants of the World Online accepts the following species:

- Tetractomia barringtonioides T.G.Hartley
- Tetractomia kostermansii T.G.Hartley
- Tetractomia majus Hook.f.
- Tetractomia rotundifolia (Ridl.) Merr. & L.M.Perry
- Tetractomia solomonense T.G.Hartley
- Tetractomia tetrandra (Roxb.) Merr.
