= Serianthes myriadenia =

- Plate by Walter Hood Fitch, 1865

Conservation status
- Vulnerable (IUCN 3.1)

Scientific classification
- Kingdom: Plantae
- Clade: Embryophytes
- Clade: Tracheophytes
- Clade: Angiosperms
- Clade: Eudicots
- Clade: Rosids
- Order: Fabales
- Family: Fabaceae
- Subfamily: Caesalpinioideae
- Clade: Mimosoid clade
- Genus: Serianthes
- Species: S. myriadenia

Binomial name
- Serianthes myriadenia Planch. ex Benth. (1846)

Synonyms
- Acacia myriadena Bertero ex Guill. (1837), not accepted by the author.; Feuilleea commutata Kuntze (1891); Feuilleea myriadenia (Planch. ex Benth.) Kuntze (1891)

Species of legume

Serianthes myriadenia is a species of flowering plant in the family Fabaceae. It is a tree native to the Marquesas and Society Islands of the Pacific.
