= Heliciopsis velutina =

Scientific classification
- Kingdom: Plantae
- Clade: Embryophytes
- Clade: Tracheophytes
- Clade: Angiosperms
- Clade: Eudicots
- Order: Proteales
- Family: Proteaceae
- Genus: Heliciopsis
- Species: H. velutina

Binomial name
- Heliciopsis velutina (Prain) Sleumer

Synonyms
- Helicia velutina Prain

Species of tree from Malaysia and Borneo

Heliciopsis velutina is a species of trees, in the family Proteaceae. They grow up to 25 metres (80 ft) tall, with a trunk diameter of up to 25 cm (10 in). The bark is dark brown. They have reddish brown flowers. They have brown, ellipsoid fruits up to 4 cm (2 in) long. The specific epithet velutina comes from the Latin meaning 'velvety', referring to the petiole. They grow naturally in lowland mixed dipterocarp forests' habitats from sea level to 600 metres (2,000 ft) altitude in Peninsular Malaysia and Borneo.
