= Lithocarpus kunstleri =

Conservation status
- Conservation Dependent (IUCN 2.3)

Scientific classification
- Kingdom: Plantae
- Clade: Tracheophytes
- Clade: Angiosperms
- Clade: Eudicots
- Clade: Rosids
- Order: Fagales
- Family: Fagaceae
- Genus: Lithocarpus
- Species: L. kunstleri

Binomial name
- Lithocarpus kunstleri (King ex Hook.f.) A.Camus

Synonyms
- Pasania kunstleri (King ex Hook.f.) Schottky; Quercus kunstleri King ex Hook.f.; Synaedrys kunstleri (King ex Hook.f.) Koidz.

Species of tree

Lithocarpus kunstleri is a species of flowering plant in the family Fagaceae. It is a tree endemic to Peninsular Malaysia. It is native to primary and secondary lowland rain forest and swamps up to 300 meters elevation. It is threatened by habitat loss.

The species was first described as Quercus kunstleri by Joseph Dalton Hooker in 1888. In 1931 Aimée Antoinette Camus placed the species in genus Lithocarpus as L. kunstleri.
