= Elaeocarpus sallehiana =

Conservation status
- Conservation Dependent (IUCN 2.3)

Scientific classification
- Kingdom: Plantae
- Clade: Tracheophytes
- Clade: Angiosperms
- Clade: Eudicots
- Clade: Rosids
- Order: Oxalidales
- Family: Elaeocarpaceae
- Genus: Elaeocarpus
- Species: E. sallehiana

Binomial name
- Elaeocarpus sallehiana Ng

Species of flowering plant endemic to Malaysia

Elaeocarpus sallehiana is a species of flowering plant in the Elaeocarpaceae family. It is a tree endemic to Peninsular Malaysia. It is threatened by habitat loss.
