= Tetractomia tetrandra =

Conservation status
- Least Concern (IUCN 3.1)

Scientific classification
- Kingdom: Plantae
- Clade: Tracheophytes
- Clade: Angiosperms
- Clade: Eudicots
- Clade: Rosids
- Order: Sapindales
- Family: Rutaceae
- Genus: Tetractomia
- Species: T. tetrandra

Binomial name
- Tetractomia tetrandra (Roxb.) Merr.

Synonyms
- Ampacus pedunculosa (Hook.f.) Kuntze; Euodia leucantha Lauterb.; Euodia pedunculosa Hook.f.; Melicope beccarii (Hook.f.) Engl.; Melicope philippinensis (Elmer) Engl.; Melicope roxburghii Engl.; Melicope tetrandra Roxb.; Terminthodia lanceolata Lauterb.; Terminthodia obovata Lauterb.; Terminthodia oppositifolia Ridl.; Terminthodia orbiculata Markgr.; Terminthodia schultzei-leonhardii Lauterb.; Terminthodia treubiana Lauterb.; Terminthodia viridiflora Ridl.; Tetractomia acuminata Merr.; Tetractomia beccarii Hook.f.; Tetractomia holttumii Ridl.; Tetractomia lanceolata (Lauterb.) Merr. & L.M.Perry; Tetractomia latifolia Ridl.; Tetractomia lauterbachiana Merr. & L.M.Perry; Tetractomia montana Ridl.; Tetractomia obovata Merr.; Tetractomia oppositifolia (Ridl.) Merr. & L.M.Perry; Tetractomia orbiculata (Markgr.) Merr. & L.M.Perry; Tetractomia pachyphylla Merr.; Tetractomia parviflora Ridl.; Tetractomia philippinensis Elmer; Tetractomia roxburghii Hook.f.; Tetractomia treubiana (Lauterb.) Merr. & L.M.Perry

Species of plant

Tetractomia tetrandra, synonym Terminthodia viridiflora, is a species of plant in the family Rutaceae. It is endemic to Peninsular Malaysia.
