= Heliciopsis percoriacea =

Scientific classification
- Kingdom: Plantae
- Clade: Embryophytes
- Clade: Tracheophytes
- Clade: Angiosperms
- Clade: Eudicots
- Order: Proteales
- Family: Proteaceae
- Genus: Heliciopsis
- Species: H. percoriacea

Binomial name
- Heliciopsis percoriacea R.C.K.Chung

Species of tree

Heliciopsis percoriacea is a tree in the family Proteaceae, native to Borneo. The specific epithet percoriacea means 'very leathery', referring to the leaves.

== Description ==
Heliciopsis percoriacea grows up to 21 metres (70 ft) tall, with a trunk diameter of up to 36 cm (14 in). The smooth bark is grey brown. The leathery leaves are elliptic and measure up to 18 cm (7 in) long. The inflorescences are solitary.

== Distribution and habitat ==
Heliciopsis percoriacea is endemic to Borneo. In Sabah, it is known from Mount Tambuyukon. Its habitat is kerangas forests or in forests on ultramafic rock.
