= Rhopaloblaste singaporensis =

Conservation status
- Conservation Dependent (IUCN 2.3)

Scientific classification
- Kingdom: Plantae
- Clade: Tracheophytes
- Clade: Angiosperms
- Clade: Monocots
- Clade: Commelinids
- Order: Arecales
- Family: Arecaceae
- Genus: Rhopaloblaste
- Species: R. singaporensis

Binomial name
- Rhopaloblaste singaporensis (Becc.) Benth. & Hook.f.

Species of palm

Rhopaloblaste singaporensis is a species of flowering plant in the family Arecaceae. It is found in Malaysia and Singapore. It is threatened by habitat loss.
