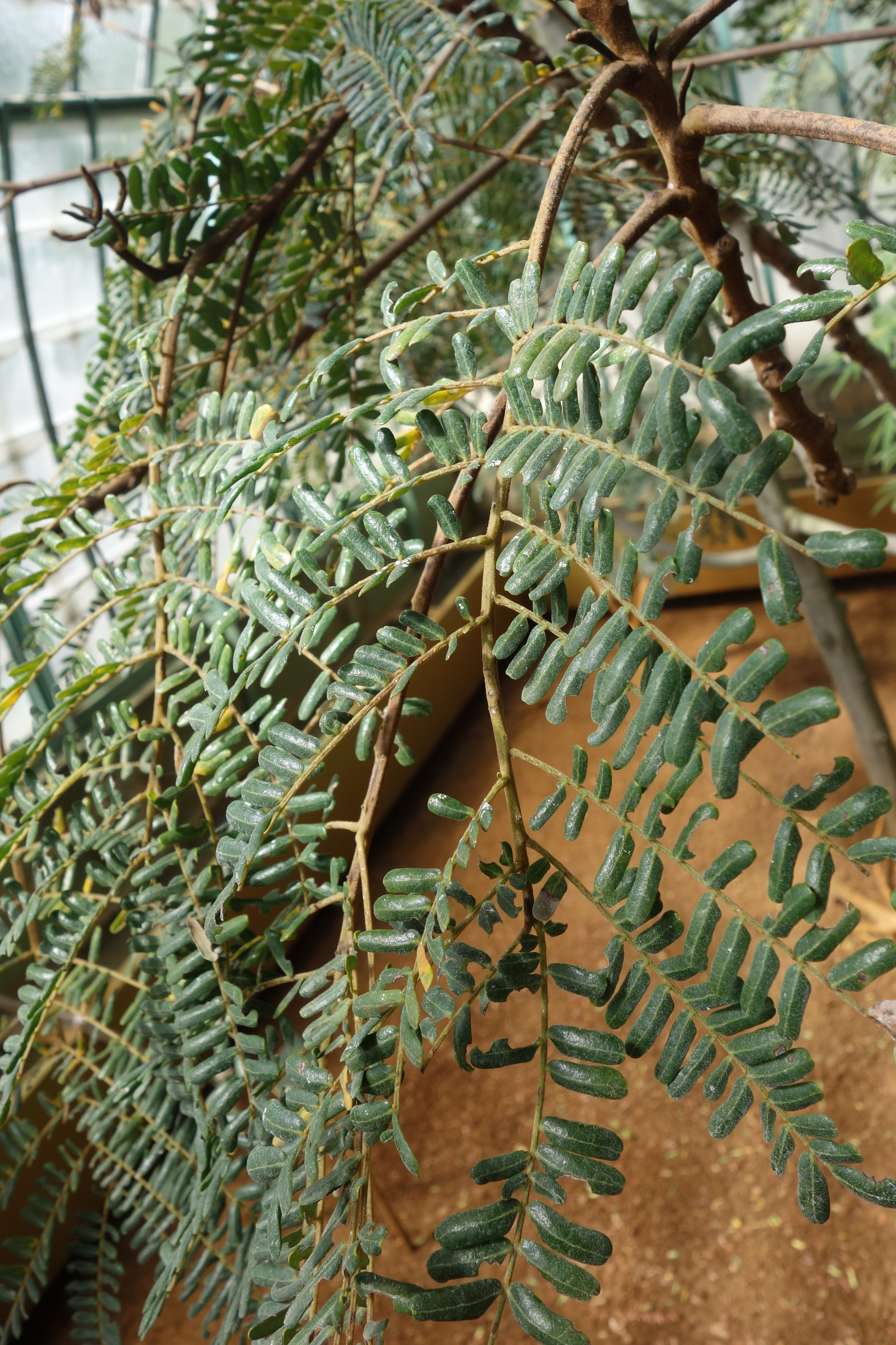
- Serianthes calycina at the Jardin des Serres d'Auteuil

Conservation status
- Vulnerable (IUCN 2.3)

Scientific classification
- Kingdom: Plantae
- Clade: Tracheophytes
- Clade: Angiosperms
- Clade: Eudicots
- Clade: Rosids
- Order: Fabales
- Family: Fabaceae
- Subfamily: Caesalpinioideae
- Clade: Mimosoid clade
- Genus: Serianthes
- Species: S. calycina

Binomial name
- Serianthes calycina Benth.

= Serianthes calycina =

Species of legume

Serianthes calycina is a species of flowering plant in the family Fabaceae. It is found only in New Caledonia. It is threatened by habitat loss.
