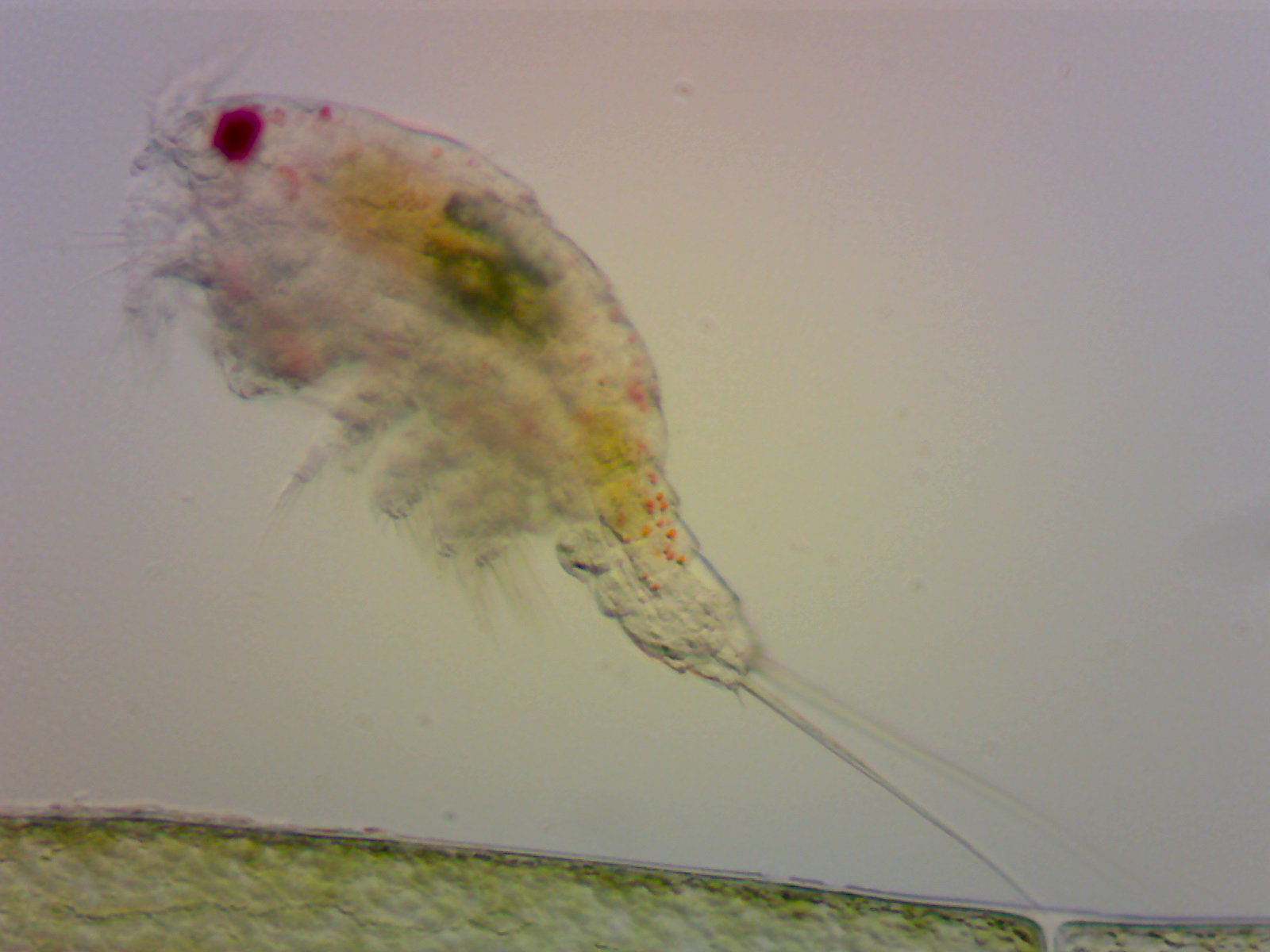
- Attheyella americana (immature) 150x

Scientific classification
- Kingdom: Animalia
- Phylum: Arthropoda
- Clade: Pancrustacea
- Class: Copepoda
- Order: Harpacticoida
- Family: Canthocamptidae
- Subfamily: Canthocamptinae
- Genus: Attheyella; Brady, 1880

Synonyms
- Canthosella Chappuis, 1931

= Attheyella =

Genus of crustaceans

Attheyella is a genus of copepods in the family Canthocamptidae, and was first described by George Stewardson Brady in 1880.

The following species are accepted by WoRMS:

- Attheyella aculeata (Thiébaud, 1912)
- Attheyella africana Brady, 1907
- Attheyella alaskaensis M. S. Wilson, 1958
- Attheyella aliena Noodt, 1956
- Attheyella alta Shen & Sung, 1965
- Attheyella americana (Herrick, 1884)
- Attheyella amurensis Borutsky, 1936
- Attheyella antillica Petkovski, 1973
- Attheyella arctica (Lilljeborg, 1902)
- Attheyella arequipensis Ebert, 1976
- Attheyella asymetrica Ebert, 1976
- Attheyella australica G. O. Sars, 1908
- Attheyella baikalensis Borutsky, 1930
- Attheyella bennetti (Brehm, 1928)
- Attheyella biarticulata Löffler, 1962
- Attheyella bicolor C. B. Wilson, 1932
- Attheyella bidens (Schmeil, 1893)
- Attheyella borutzkyi Smirnov, 1930
- Attheyella brasiliana Ebert, 1976
- Attheyella brasiliensis Ebert, 1976
- Attheyella brehmi Chappuis, 1929
- Attheyella broiensis Reid, 1994
- Attheyella bromelicola Ebert, 1976
- Attheyella bryobiota Ebert, 1976
- Attheyella bullata Ebert & Noodt, 1975
- Attheyella byblis Chang & H. S. Kim, 1992
- Attheyella calamensis Ebert, 1976
- Attheyella camposi Ebert & Noodt, 1975
- Attheyella capensis Ruhe, 1914
- Attheyella carolinensis Chappuis, 1932
- Attheyella caroliniana Coker, 1926
- Attheyella chilensis Ebert & Noodt, 1975
- Attheyella ciliata Löffler, 1962
- Attheyella cingalensis Brady, 1886
- Attheyella clavigera Harding, 1955
- Attheyella coiffaiti Chappuis, 1958
- Attheyella cordillierica Dussart, 1984
- Attheyella coreana Miura, 1969
- Attheyella coronata G. O. Sars, 1904
- Attheyella crassa (G. O. Sars, 1863)
- Attheyella crenulata (Mrázek, 1901)
- Attheyella cryptorum Brady, 1880
- Attheyella curacautensis Ebert, 1976
- Attheyella cuspidata (Schmeil, 1893)
- Attheyella dadayi (Chappuis, 1924)
- Attheyella decorata (Daday, 1901)
- Attheyella dentata (Poggenpol, 1874)
- Attheyella derelicta (Brian, 1927)
- Attheyella dogieli (Rylov, 1923)
- Attheyella duthiei T. Scott, 1896
- Attheyella ekmani Kiefer, 1933
- Attheyella elaphoides Ebert, 1976
- Attheyella ensifer (Delachaux, 1918)
- Attheyella farellonensis Ebert, 1976
- Attheyella ferox (Delachaux, 1919)
- Attheyella fimbriata (Brehm, 1950)
- Attheyella fluviatilis Chappuis, 1931
- Attheyella freyi Löffler, 1963
- Attheyella frigida Willey, 1925
- Attheyella fuhrmanni (Thiébaud, 1912)
- Attheyella gessneri Chappuis, 1956
- Attheyella gladkovi Borutsky, 1952
- Attheyella godeti Jakobi, 1959
- Attheyella goeldii Ebert, 1976
- Attheyella gracilis (G. O. Sars, 1863)
- Attheyella grandidieri (Guerne & Richard, 1893)
- Attheyella guyanensis (Delachaux, 1924)
- Attheyella hannae (Kiefer, 1926)
- Attheyella heterospina Shen & Tai, 1964
- Attheyella hirsuta Chappuis, 1951
- Attheyella horvathi (Chappuis, 1924)
- Attheyella huaronensis (Delachaux, 1918)
- Attheyella humidarum M. H. Lewis, 1972
- Attheyella idahoensis (Marsh, 1903)
- Attheyella ilami Dumont & Maas, 1988
- Attheyella illinoisensis (S. A. Forbes, 1876)
- Attheyella incae (Brehm, 1936)
- Attheyella incerta (Brehm, 1950)
- Attheyella inconstans Harding, 1955
- Attheyella inopinata Chappuis, 1931
- Attheyella insignis (Delachaux, 1918)
- Attheyella jureiae Por & Hadel, 1986
- Attheyella kalima (Delachaux, 1924)
- Attheyella koenigi Pesta, 1928
- Attheyella koepkei Ebert, 1976
- Attheyella laciniata Ebert & Noodt, 1975
- Attheyella lacustris Chappuis, 1931
- Attheyella lanata (Mrázek, 1901)
- Attheyella lanceolata (Delachaux, 1918)
- Attheyella levigata Löffler, 1962
- Attheyella lewisae Wells, 2007
- Attheyella macandrewae T. & A. Scott, 1895
- Attheyella maorica (Brehm, 1928)
- Attheyella marina Gurney, 1927
- Attheyella maxima (Delachaux, 1918)
- Attheyella meridionalis Dussart, 1982
- Attheyella mervini Janetzky, Martínez Arbizu & Reid, 1996
- Attheyella minuta Chappuis, 1931
- Attheyella mongoliana Shen & Chang, 1966
- Attheyella montana Ebert, 1976
- Attheyella morimotoi Miura, 1962
- Attheyella multisetosa Ebert, 1976
- Attheyella multispinosa Ebert, 1976
- Attheyella muscicola (Chappuis, 1928)
- Attheyella nakaii (Brehm, 1927)
- Attheyella naphtalica Por, 1983
- Attheyella natalis Brady, 1904
- Attheyella nebulosa Ebert, 1976
- Attheyella nepalensis Löffler, 1968
- Attheyella nivalis Willey, 1925
- Attheyella noodti Ebert, 1976
- Attheyella nordenskioldii (Lilljeborg, 1902)
- Attheyella northumbrica (Brady, 1880)
- Attheyella northumbricoides Willey, 1925
- Attheyella nuda Löffler, 1962
- Attheyella obatogamensis (Willey, 1925)
- Attheyella oculata Löffler, 1963
- Attheyella oculta Ebert, 1976
- Attheyella orientalis Chappuis, 1929
- Attheyella orinocoensis Dussart, 1984
- Attheyella ornata Löffler, 1962
- Attheyella osmana (Kiefer, 1955)
- Attheyella palustris (Brady, 1880)
- Attheyella paranaphtalica Pesce & Galassi, 1988
- Attheyella paucisetosa Chang & H. S. Kim, 1992
- Attheyella pauliani (Chappuis, 1954)
- Attheyella peruana Ebert, 1976
- Attheyella phytobiotica Ebert, 1976
- Attheyella pichilafquensis Löffler, 1961
- Attheyella picola Ebert, 1976
- Attheyella pilagaensis Janetzky, Martínez Arbizu & Reid, 1996
- Attheyella pilosa Chappuis, 1929
- Attheyella propinqua T. Scott, 1893
- Attheyella pygmaea (G. O. Sars, 1863)
- Attheyella quatuorspinosa Ebert, 1976
- Attheyella quillehuensis Löffler, 1961
- Attheyella quinquespinosa Shen & Tai, 1964
- Attheyella reducta Chappuis, 1958
- Attheyella rhaetica (Schmeil, 1893)
- Attheyella rotoruensis M. H. Lewis, 1972
- Attheyella ruttneri Chappuis, 1931
- Attheyella salvadorica Ebert, 1976
- Attheyella salvatoris (Brehm, 1950)
- Attheyella salviniae Ebert, 1976
- Attheyella sancarlensis (O. Rocha & Matsumura-Tundisi, 1976)
- Attheyella santaremensis Ebert, 1976
- Attheyella schindleri Kiefer, 1957
- Attheyella septemarticulata Ebert, 1976
- Attheyella serrata Löffler, 1962
- Attheyella silvestris Ebert, 1976
- Attheyella silvicola Löffler, 1973
- Attheyella singalensis Brady, 1886
- Attheyella siolii (Kiefer, 1967)
- Attheyella sphagnobiotica Ebert, 1976
- Attheyella spinipes Reid, 1987
- Attheyella spinosa Brady, 1880
- Attheyella stachanovi Borutsky, 1952
- Attheyella stillicidarum M. H. Lewis, 1972
- Attheyella striblingi (Reid, 1990)
- Attheyella subarctica Willey, 1925
- Attheyella tasmaniae Chappuis, 1951
- Attheyella tetraspinosa Chang, 1993
- Attheyella triangulata Ebert, 1976
- Attheyella trigonura (Ekman, 1905)
- Attheyella trispinosa (Brady, 1880)
- Attheyella ussuriensis Rylov, 1932
- Attheyella vera Por & Hadel, 1986
- Attheyella vietnamica Borutsky, 1967
- Attheyella vivianii Ebert & Noodt, 1975
- Attheyella warreni Brady, 1913
- Attheyella wiegoldi (Brehm, 1923)
- Attheyella wierzejskii (Mrázek, 1893)
- Attheyella wieseri Rouch, 1962
- Attheyella willeyi Kiefer, 1929
- Attheyella wulmeri (Kerhervé, 1914)
- Attheyella wulmeroides Borutsky, 1931
- Attheyella yemanjae Reid, 1994
- Attheyella yesoensis Ishida, 1993
- Attheyella yunnanensis Shen & Tai, 1979
- Attheyella zschokkei (Schmeil, 1893)
