= Macaranga quadricornis =

Conservation status
- Conservation Dependent (IUCN 2.3)

Scientific classification
- Kingdom: Plantae
- Clade: Tracheophytes
- Clade: Angiosperms
- Clade: Eudicots
- Clade: Rosids
- Order: Malpighiales
- Family: Euphorbiaceae
- Genus: Macaranga
- Species: M. quadricornis

Binomial name
- Macaranga quadricornis Ridley

Species of tree

Macaranga quadricornis is a species of plant in the family Euphorbiaceae. It is a tree endemic to Peninsular Malaysia. It is threatened by habitat loss.
