= Rhopaloblaste elegans =

Conservation status
- Data Deficient (IUCN 2.3)

Scientific classification
- Kingdom: Plantae
- Clade: Tracheophytes
- Clade: Angiosperms
- Clade: Monocots
- Clade: Commelinids
- Order: Arecales
- Family: Arecaceae
- Genus: Rhopaloblaste
- Species: R. elegans

Binomial name
- Rhopaloblaste elegans H.E.Moore

Species of palm

Rhopaloblaste elegans is a species of flowering plant in the family Arecaceae.

== Distribution and habitat ==
It is endemic to the Solomon Islands where it is threatened by habitat loss. It has been observed growing in moist, lowland, primary forests.
