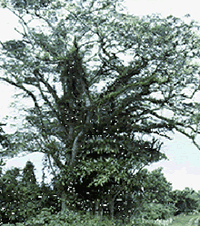

Conservation status
- Critically Endangered (IUCN 3.1)

- Endangered (ESA)

Scientific classification
- Kingdom: Plantae
- Clade: Tracheophytes
- Clade: Angiosperms
- Clade: Eudicots
- Clade: Rosids
- Order: Fabales
- Family: Fabaceae
- Subfamily: Caesalpinioideae
- Clade: Mimosoid clade
- Genus: Serianthes
- Species: S. nelsonii

Binomial name
- Serianthes nelsonii Merr.
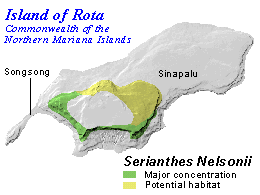

= Serianthes nelsonii =

Species of legume

Serianthes nelsonii is a large tree endemic to Guam and Rota of the Mariana Islands. Only one mature tree existed on Guam (until November 2024, when it was announced it perished to the consequences of deforestation by the U.S. Military and the 2023 Typhoon Mawar), while 121 mature trees have been identified on Rota since 1984.

The tree is found in limestone forests in Rota and Guam. It has bipinnately compound leaves and brush-like flowers with long pinkish filaments. Seedpods contain one to seven smooth brown seeds.

== Name ==
There are three local names for Serianthes nelsonii. On Guam, it is known as hayun lågu, meaning "northern tree" or "foreign tree", referring to Rota, which is located north of Guam. The common name on Rota is trongkon guåfi, meaning "fire tree". Another name on Rota is trongkon fi'a may have originated in a region on Rota called Fia. Alternatively, "fi'a" may have derived from the Chamorro pronunciation of "fire", from "guåfi". The species was named "nelsonii" by E.D. Merrill in 1919 to honor Peter Nelson of the Guam Department of Agriculture, the discoverer of the plant.

== Conservation ==
Serianthes nelsonii was declared an endangered plant in 1987 and was assessed as critically endangered in 1998 and again in 2017. The University of Guam began a program to save the plant in 1998 with the help of numerous other agencies. Serianthes nelsonii seedlings are being raised on protected lands for transplantation back into the wilds of Guam. On Rota, the Department of Lands and Natural Resource is monitoring the plant population and growing seedlings in a plant nursery.

Guam's single mature Serianthes nelsonii, known as the "mother tree," existed within the Multipurpose Machine Gun Range at Camp Blaz in Ritidian. In June 2019, the Legislature of Guam passed a resolution urging a halt to the planned military buildup and construction until the impact to Serianthes nelsonii could be investigated. In 2019, the tree was diagnosed with heart rot and suffered from insect infestations. High winds during Typhoon Mawar toppled the tree in 2023, and in 2024 it was declared dead. 4,007 seeds have been collected from the mother tree and are being used for outplanting initiatives, but seedlings face threats from invasive pigs and deer.

Insufficient regeneration is blamed for the decline of the population. Possible causes include insect predation on seeds and predation on seedlings by invasive ungulates and mealybugs. The subpopulation on Rota is expected to decline as older trees die.

== See also ==
List of endemic plants in the Mariana Islands
