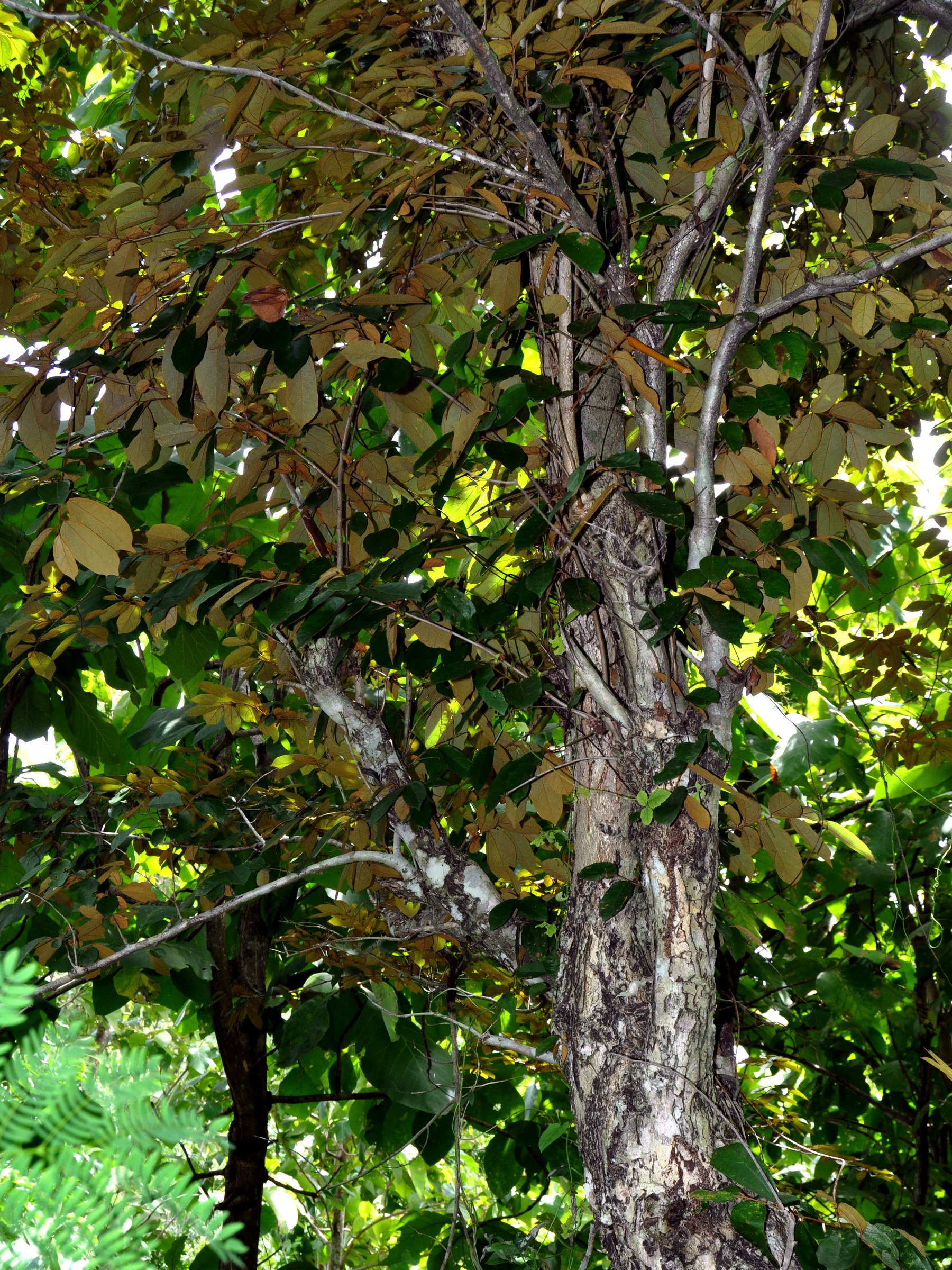
- Schoutenia ovata

Scientific classification
- Kingdom: Plantae
- Clade: Tracheophytes
- Clade: Angiosperms
- Clade: Eudicots
- Clade: Rosids
- Order: Malvales
- Family: Malvaceae
- Subfamily: Dombeyoideae
- Genus: Schoutenia; Korth. (1848)

Species
- 10, see text

Synonyms
- Actinophora Wall. (1852); Chartacalyx Maingay ex Mast. (1874); Sicrea Hallier f. (1921)

= Schoutenia =

Genus of flowering plants

Schoutenia is a genus of flowering plants. It ranges from Indochina through Malaysia, Indonesia, New Guinea, and Northern Australia.

Traditionally included in the family Tiliaceae, it is included in the expanded Malvaceae in the APG and most subsequent systematics. Pieter Willem Korthals described it in 1847/8 and named it after the explorer Willem Schouten.

== Species ==
There are ten accepted species.

- Schoutenia accrescens (Mast.) Merr. – Peninsular Thailand, Malay Peninsula, Borneo
- Schoutenia cornerii Roekm. – Malay Peninsula
- Schoutenia curtisii Roekm. – Thailand
- Schoutenia furfuracea Kochummen – Malay Peninsula
- Schoutenia glomerata King – Malay Peninsula
- Schoutenia godefroyana Baill. – Thailand, Cambodia
- Schoutenia kostermansii Roekm. – Thailand
- Schoutenia kunstleri King – Peninsular Thailand, Malay Peninsula, Java
- Schoutenia leprosula Saw – Malay Peninsula
- Schoutenia ovata Korth. – Vietnam, Laos, Cambodia, Thailand, Java, Lesser Sunda Islands, Maluku, New Guinea, Northern Territory
