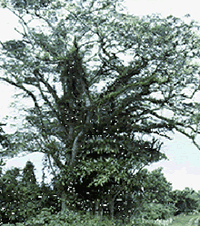
- Serianthes nelsonii

Scientific classification
- Kingdom: Plantae
- Clade: Tracheophytes
- Clade: Angiosperms
- Clade: Eudicots
- Clade: Rosids
- Order: Fabales
- Family: Fabaceae
- Subfamily: Caesalpinioideae
- Clade: Mimosoid clade
- Genus: Serianthes; Benth. (1844)

Species
- 17; see text

= Serianthes =

Genus of legumes

Serianthes is a genus of flowering plants in the family Fabaceae. It includes 17 species of trees and shrubs which range from Thailand and Malesia to Papuasia and the South Pacific. New Caledonia has the greatest diversity of species, with six endemic species. Typical habitats include tropical rain forest, scrub forest, coastal scrub, and rarely open wooded grassland.

== Species ==
17 species are accepted:

- Serianthes calycina Benth.
- Serianthes ebudarum Fosberg
- Serianthes germainii Guillaumin
- Serianthes grandiflora Benth.
- Serianthes hooglandii (Fosberg) Kanis
- Serianthes kanehirae Fosberg
- Serianthes lifouensis (Fosberg) I.C.Nielsen
- Serianthes margaretae I.C.Nielsen
- Serianthes melanesica Fosberg
- Serianthes minahassae (Koord.) Merr. & L.M.Perry
- Serianthes myriadenia Planch. ex Benth.
- Serianthes nelsonii Merr.
- Serianthes petitiana Guillaumin
- Serianthes rurutensis (F.Br.) I.C.Nielsen
- Serianthes sachetae Fosberg
- Serianthes vitiensis A.Gray
