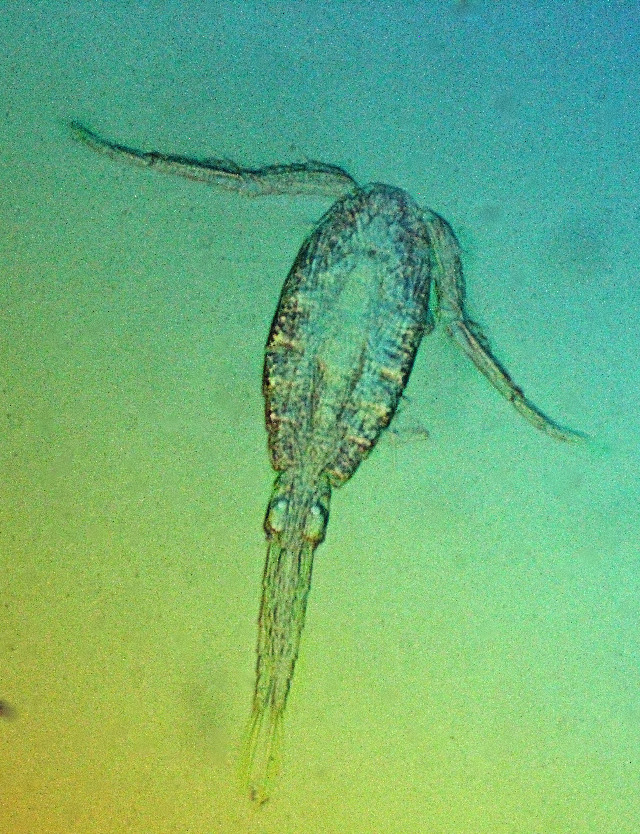
- Thermocyclops inversus

Scientific classification
- Domain: Eukaryota
- Kingdom: Animalia
- Phylum: Arthropoda
- Class: Copepoda
- Order: Cyclopoida
- Family: Cyclopidae
- Genus: Thermocyclops; Kiefer, 1927

= Thermocyclops =

Genus of crustaceans

Thermocyclops is a genus of crustacean in family Cyclopidae. It was first described and later extensively researched by Friedrich Kiefer, who discovered some 20 species. The species and subspecies of the genus inhabit fresh and brackish waters alike (rarely ground waters) all around the world, although most are from tropical areas.

The genus contains the following species:

- Thermocyclops africae Baribwegure, Thirion & Dumont, 2001
- Thermocyclops analogus Kiefer, 1936
- Thermocyclops asiaticus (Kiefer, 1932)
- Thermocyclops brehmi (Kiefer, 1927)
- Thermocyclops brevifurcatus (Harada, 1931)
- Thermocyclops byzantinus Kiefer, 1952
- Thermocyclops consimilis Kiefer, 1934
- Thermocyclops conspicuus Lindberg, 1950
- Thermocyclops crassus (Fischer, 1853)
- Thermocyclops crenulatus Brehm, 1949
- Thermocyclops crucis Holynska, 2006
- Thermocyclops dalmaticus Petkovski, 1956
- Thermocyclops decipiens (Kiefer, 1929)
- Thermocyclops decoratus Dussart, 1978
- Thermocyclops dumonti Baribwegure & Mirabdullayev, 2003
- Thermocyclops dybowskii (Landé, 1890)
- Thermocyclops emini (Mrázek, 1898)
- Thermocyclops ethiopiensis Defaye, 1988
- Thermocyclops hastatus (Kiefer, 1952)
- Thermocyclops hooki Löffler, 1968
- Thermocyclops hyalinus (Rehberg, 1880)
- Thermocyclops ianthinus Harada, 1931
- Thermocyclops iguapensis W. M. Silva & Matsumura-Tundisi, 2005
- Thermocyclops incisus (Kiefer, 1932)
- Thermocyclops infrequens (Kiefer, 1929)
- Thermocyclops inopinus (Kiefer, 1926)
- Thermocyclops inversus (Kiefer, 1936)
- Thermocyclops iwoyiensis Onabamiro, 1952
- Thermocyclops kawamurai K. Kikuchi, 1940
- Thermocyclops kivuensis Kiefer, 1952
- Thermocyclops macracanthus (Kiefer, 1929)
- Thermocyclops macrolasius Kiefer, 1952
- Thermocyclops maheensis Lindberg, 1941
- Thermocyclops microspinulosus Lindberg, 1942
- Thermocyclops minutus (Lowndes, 1934)
- Thermocyclops mongolicus Kiefer, 1937
- Thermocyclops ndalaganus Kiefer, 1952
- Thermocyclops neglectus (G. O. Sars, 1909)
- Thermocyclops nigerianus Kiefer, 1932
- Thermocyclops oblongatus (G. O. Sars, 1927)
- Thermocyclops oithonoides (G. O. Sars, 1863)
- Thermocyclops operculifer Kiefer, 1930
- Thermocyclops orghidani (Plesa, 1981)
- Thermocyclops orientalis Dussart & Fernando, 1985
- Thermocyclops ouadanei van de Velde, 1978
- Thermocyclops pachysetosus Lindberg, 1951
- Thermocyclops parvus Reid, 1989
- Thermocyclops philippinensis (Marsh, 1932)
- Thermocyclops pseudoperculifer Holynska, 2006
- Thermocyclops retroversus (Kiefer, 1929)
- Thermocyclops rylovi (Smirnov, 1928)
- Thermocyclops schmeili (Poppe & Mrázek, 1895)
- Thermocyclops schuurmanae (Kiefer, 1928)
- Thermocyclops stephanidesi Kiefer, 1938
- Thermocyclops taihokuensis Harada, 1931
- Thermocyclops tchadensis Dussart & Gras, 1966
- Thermocyclops tenuis (Marsh, 1910)
- Thermocyclops thermocyclopoides (Harada, 1931)
- Thermocyclops tinctus Lindberg, 1936
- Thermocyclops trichophorus Kiefer, 1930
- Thermocyclops uenoi ItoTak, 1952
- Thermocyclops vermifer Lindberg, 1935
- Thermocyclops vizarae (Fryer, 1957)
- Thermocyclops wolterecki Kiefer, 1938
