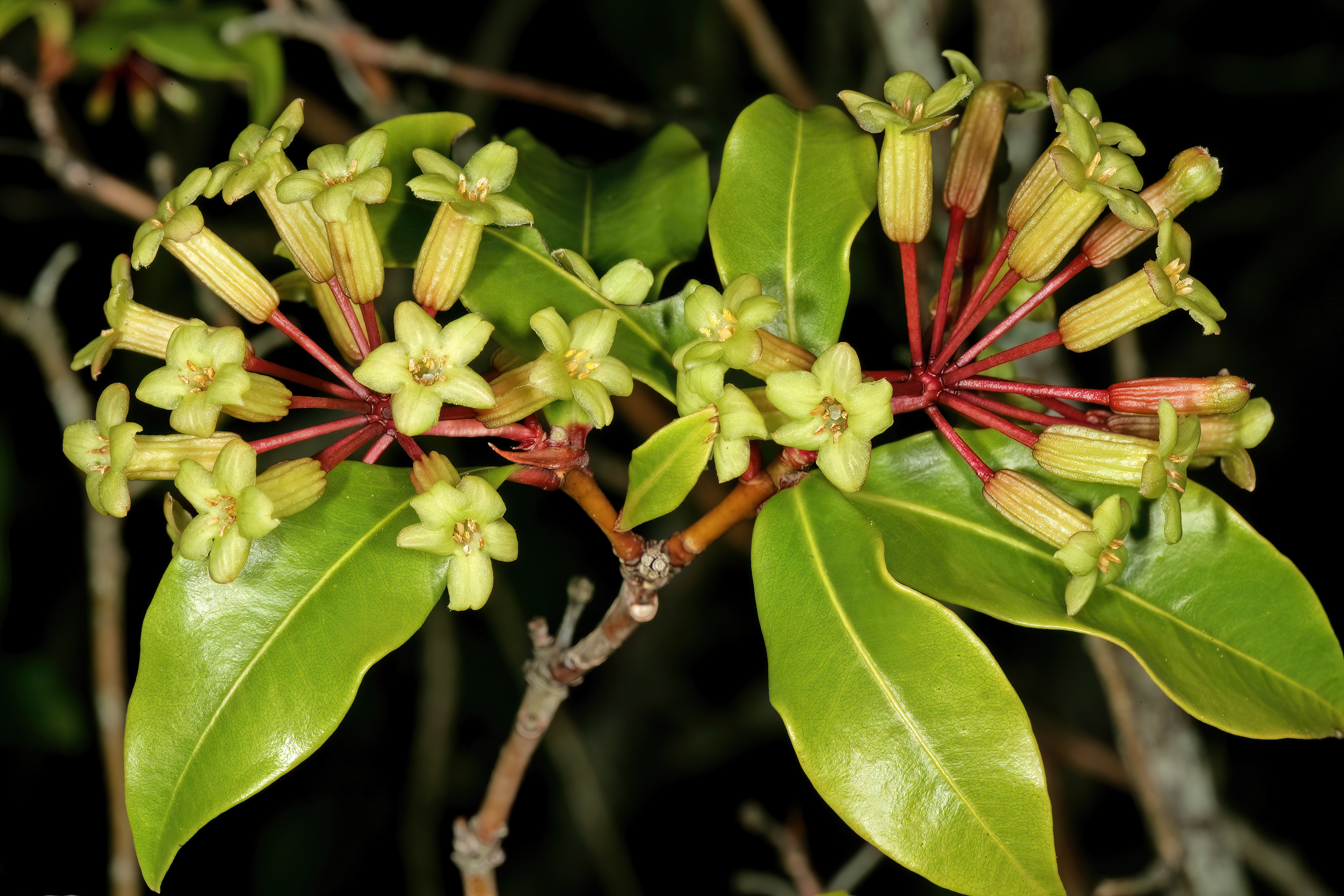
- Peddiea africana var. africana

Scientific classification
- Kingdom: Plantae
- Clade: Tracheophytes
- Clade: Angiosperms
- Clade: Eudicots
- Clade: Rosids
- Order: Malvales
- Family: Thymelaeaceae
- Subfamily: Thymelaeoideae
- Genus: Peddiea; Harv. (1840)

Synonyms
- Cyathodiscus Hochst. (1842); Psilosolena C.Presl (1845)

= Peddiea =

Genus of flowering plants

Peddiea is a genus of plant in the family Thymelaeaceae. It includes 16 species native to tropical and southern Africa and Madagascar.

== Species ==
16 species are accepted.

- Peddiea africana Harv.
- Peddiea arborescens A.Robyns
- Peddiea fischeri Engl.
- Peddiea involucrata Baker
- Peddiea kaniamensis A.Robyns
- Peddiea kivuensis A.Robyns
- Peddiea lanceolata Domke
- Peddiea montana Domke
- Peddiea orophila A.Robyns
- Peddiea parviflora Hook.f.
- Peddiea polyantha Gilg
- Peddiea puberula Domke
- Peddiea rapaneoides Gilg ex Engl.
- Peddiea subcordata Domke
- Peddiea thomensis Exell
- Peddiea thulinii Temu
