= Rhopaloblaste augusta =

Conservation status
- Vulnerable (IUCN 2.3)

Scientific classification
- Kingdom: Plantae
- Clade: Tracheophytes
- Clade: Angiosperms
- Clade: Monocots
- Clade: Commelinids
- Order: Arecales
- Family: Arecaceae
- Genus: Rhopaloblaste
- Species: R. augusta

Binomial name
- Rhopaloblaste augusta (Kurz) H.E.Moore

Synonyms
- Areca augusta Kurz; Ptychoraphis augusta (Kurz) Becc.

Species of palm

Rhopaloblaste augusta is a species of flowering plant in the family Arecaceae. It is found on the Nicobar Islands in the Indian Ocean, part of India. It is also found in Peninsular Malaysia & Singapore, the Moluccas, New Guinea & the Solomon Islands. In lowland rain forest. It is threatened by habitat loss.
