= Rhopaloblaste =

Scientific classification
- Kingdom: Plantae
- Clade: Tracheophytes
- Clade: Angiosperms
- Clade: Monocots
- Clade: Commelinids
- Order: Arecales
- Family: Arecaceae
- Subfamily: Arecoideae
- Tribe: Areceae
- Genus: Rhopaloblaste; Scheff.

Synonyms
- Ptychoraphis Becc.

Genus of palms

Rhopaloblaste is a genus of flowering plant in the family Arecaceae, native to New Guinea, Melanesia and Southeast Asia.

It contains the following species:

- Rhopaloblaste augusta (Kurz) H.E.Moore - Nicobar Islands, Peninsular Malaysia & Singapore, the Moluccas, New Guinea & the Solomon Islands
- Rhopaloblaste ceramica (Miq.) Burret - New Guinea, Maluku
- Rhopaloblaste elegans H.E.Moore - Solomon Islands
- Rhopaloblaste gideonii Banka - New Ireland
- Rhopaloblaste ledermanniana Becc. - New Guinea
- Rhopaloblaste singaporensis (Becc.) Hook.f. - Singapore and Peninsular Malaysia
