= Heliciopsis litseifolia =

Scientific classification
- Kingdom: Plantae
- Clade: Embryophytes
- Clade: Tracheophytes
- Clade: Angiosperms
- Clade: Eudicots
- Order: Proteales
- Family: Proteaceae
- Genus: Heliciopsis
- Species: H. litseifolia

Binomial name
- Heliciopsis litseifolia R.C.K.Chung

Species of tree

Heliciopsis litseifolia is a tree in the family Proteaceae, native to Southeast Asia. The specific epithet litseifolia refers to the similarity of the leaves to those of the genus Litsea.

== Description ==
Heliciopsis litseifolia grows up to 25 metres (80 ft) tall, with a trunk diameter of up to 25 cm (10 in), occasionally to 50 cm (20 in). The bark is smooth and hoop-marked. The leathery leaves are elliptic and measure up to 25 cm (10 in) long. The inflorescences are solitary. The fruits dry black.

== Distribution and habitat ==
Heliciopsis litseifolia is native to Borneo, Peninsular Malaysia and Sumatra. Its habitat is dipterocarp forests, to elevations of 900 m (3,000 ft).
