= Heliciopsis mahmudii =

Scientific classification
- Kingdom: Plantae
- Clade: Embryophytes
- Clade: Tracheophytes
- Clade: Angiosperms
- Clade: Eudicots
- Order: Proteales
- Family: Proteaceae
- Genus: Heliciopsis
- Species: H. mahmudii

Binomial name
- Heliciopsis mahmudii (P.Chai) R.C.K.Chung

Synonyms
- Helicia mahmudii P.Chai

Species of tree

Heliciopsis mahmudii is a tree in the family Proteaceae, native to Borneo. It is named for the former Chief Minister of Sarawak, Abdul Taib Mahmud.

== Description ==
Heliciopsis mahmudii grows as a small tree up to 5 metres (16 ft) tall, with a trunk diameter of up to 4 cm (1.6 in). The bark is dark brown and cracked. The leathery leaves are lanceolate to oblong and measure up to 42 cm (17 in) long. The inflorescences are solitary.

== Distribution and habitat ==
Heliciopsis mahmudii is endemic to Borneo, where it is confined to Sarawak, including in the Lanjak Entimau Wildlife Sanctuary. Its habitat is in areas of regrowth following landslides, at elevations of 600–850 m (2,000–2,800 ft).
