= Rhododendron fictolacteum =

Conservation status
- Conservation Dependent (IUCN 2.3)

Scientific classification
- Kingdom: Plantae
- Clade: Tracheophytes
- Clade: Angiosperms
- Clade: Eudicots
- Clade: Asterids
- Order: Ericales
- Family: Ericaceae
- Genus: Rhododendron
- Species: R. fictolacteum

Binomial name
- Rhododendron fictolacteum Balf.f.

Synonyms
- Rhododendron rex subsp. fictolacteum (Balf.f.) D.F.Chamb.

Species of plant

Rhododendron fictolacteum is a species of plant in the family Ericaceae. It is endemic to China.
