= Ilex tahanensis =

Conservation status
- Conservation Dependent (IUCN 2.3)

Scientific classification
- Kingdom: Plantae
- Clade: Tracheophytes
- Clade: Angiosperms
- Clade: Eudicots
- Clade: Asterids
- Order: Aquifoliales
- Family: Aquifoliaceae
- Genus: Ilex
- Species: I. tahanensis

Binomial name
- Ilex tahanensis Kiew

Species of holly

Ilex tahanensis is a species of plant in the family Aquifoliaceae. It is a tree endemic to Peninsular Malaysia.
