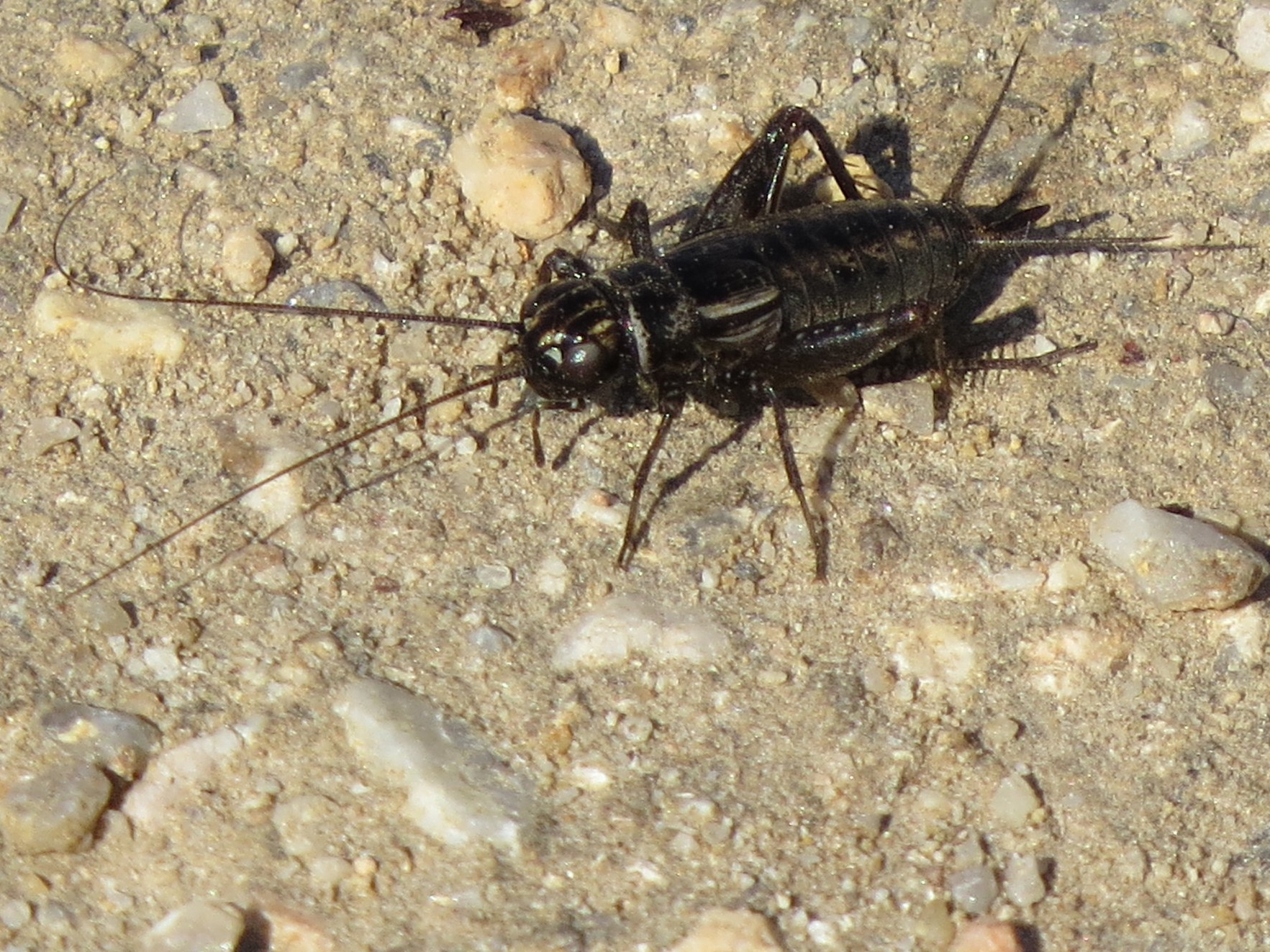

Conservation status
- Conservation Dependent (IUCN 2.3)

Scientific classification
- Kingdom: Animalia
- Phylum: Arthropoda
- Class: Insecta
- Order: Orthoptera
- Suborder: Ensifera
- Family: Trigonidiidae
- Subfamily: Nemobiinae
- Tribe: Pteronemobiini
- Genus: Neonemobius
- Species: N. eurynotus

Binomial name
- Neonemobius eurynotus (Rehn & Hebard, 1918)

= Neonemobius eurynotus =

Species of cricket

Neonemobius eurynotus is a species of cricket in the subfamily Nemobiinae. It is native to California, where it can be found in the San Francisco Bay Area. Its common names include Bay Area ground cricket and California ground cricket.
