= Metacyclops campestris =

Conservation status
- Conservation Dependent (IUCN 2.3)

Scientific classification
- Kingdom: Animalia
- Phylum: Arthropoda
- Class: Copepoda
- Order: Cyclopoida
- Family: Cyclopidae
- Genus: Metacyclops
- Species: M. campestris

Binomial name
- Metacyclops campestris Reid, 1987

Species of crustacean

Metacyclops campestris is a species of copepod in the family Cyclopidae.

The IUCN conservation status of Metacyclops campestris is conservation dependent. The IUCN status was reviewed in 1996.
