= Muscocyclops bidentatus =

Conservation status
- Conservation Dependent (IUCN 2.3)

Scientific classification
- Kingdom: Animalia
- Phylum: Arthropoda
- Class: Copepoda
- Order: Cyclopoida
- Family: Cyclopidae
- Genus: Muscocyclops
- Species: M. bidentatus

Binomial name
- Muscocyclops bidentatus Reid, 1987

Species of crustacean

Muscocyclops bidentatus is a species of copepod in the family Cyclopidae. It is endemic to Brazil. Its natural habitat is swamps.
