= Ammopelmatus nigrocapitatus =

Conservation status
- Conservation Dependent (IUCN 2.3)

Scientific classification
- Kingdom: Animalia
- Phylum: Arthropoda
- Clade: Pancrustacea
- Class: Insecta
- Order: Orthoptera
- Suborder: Ensifera
- Family: Stenopelmatidae
- Genus: Ammopelmatus
- Species: A. nigrocapitatus

Binomial name
- Ammopelmatus nigrocapitatus (Tinkham & Rentz, 1969)

Species of cricket-like animal

Ammopelmatus nigrocapitatus, known as Black-headed Jerusalem cricket, is a species of insect in the family Stenopelmatidae. It is endemic to parts of Southern California.
