= Thermocyclops parvus =

Conservation status
- Conservation Dependent (IUCN 2.3)

Scientific classification
- Kingdom: Animalia
- Phylum: Arthropoda
- Class: Copepoda
- Order: Cyclopoida
- Family: Cyclopidae
- Genus: Thermocyclops
- Species: T. parvus

Binomial name
- Thermocyclops parvus Reid, 1989

Species of crustacean

Thermocyclops parvus is a species of copepod in the family Cyclopidae. It is endemic to the United States, where it is known only from the Everglades in Florida. Its natural habitat is swamps.
