= Muscocyclops therasiae =

Conservation status
- Conservation Dependent (IUCN 2.3)

Scientific classification
- Domain: Eukaryota
- Kingdom: Animalia
- Phylum: Arthropoda
- Class: Copepoda
- Order: Cyclopoida
- Family: Cyclopidae
- Genus: Muscocyclops
- Species: M. therasiae

Binomial name
- Muscocyclops therasiae Reid, 1987

Species of crustacean

Muscocyclops therasiae is a species of copepod in the family Cyclopidae. It is endemic to Brazil. Its natural habitat is swamps.
