= IUCN Green Status of Species =

Conservation assessment system

The IUCN Green Status of Species is a conservation assessment system published by the International Union for Conservation of Nature (IUCN) that grades the impact of recovery and conservation efforts for individual species. The first version of the Green Status assessment guidelines was published in 2018, and integration of Green statuses into Red List assessments was formalized as an optional component in 2020. The second version of the framework was published in 2021.

== History ==
The creation of the Green Status system began with the formal call of the World Conservation Congress (WCC) in 2012 for the creation of "Green Lists" for ecosystems, protected areas and species based on a set of measurement systems for conservation success. In Resolution 41, the WCC noted that merely preventing extinction of species or loss of ecosystems, the goal of the Red Lists, was insufficient to retain biodiversity, preserve the valuable ecological services provided by ecosystems and species and maintain their resilience in the face of threats like those posed by climate change.

Ultimately, the Green List of Species was developed separately from what became the IUCN Green List of Protected and Conserved Areas. In 2020, the IUCN decided to rename the Green List of Species the IUCN Green Status of Species due to methodological differences between it and the Green List of Protected and Conserved Areas and concern that having a species receive a Green "listing" might be perceived as implying that it is not at risk of extinction. The Green Status complements the Red List assessment but does not replace it: both assessments are performed by the IUCN for a given species and, with the exception of species extinct in the wild that would require reintroduction as a conservation measure and whose current Green Score is by definition 0%, one status does not determine the other. The co-chairs of the initial IUCN Green Status of Species working group were Molly K. Grace and Barney Long of Re:wild.

=== Pilot program ===
As of April 2020, preliminary IUCN Green Status assessments had been performed for 179 species. Among the IUCN Species Survival Commission Specialist Groups and IUCN Red List Authorities in existence in 2018, 52 out of the 135 working groups chose to contribute to the Green Status pilot. In interviews of stakeholders performed by the IUCN, it was suggested that Green List assessments may be most effective if performed at multiple spatial scales, such as in a regional assessment. Interviewees expressed concerns over the difficulty of establishing baseline Green Scores, especially for species that live in places difficult to survey, like the ocean, and in places, such as Europe, where human change has been occurring for a long time. They were also concerned about the cost of producing the new, complex assessments. The pilot was judged successful by the IUCN, leading to the launch of the program in mid-2021 and publication of Green Status assessments in the IUCN Red List using the updated Green Status of Species standard.

== Assessment ==
The score (Green Score) is an average of spatial units currently occupied or occupied in the past by a species weighted by their status. Spatial units are discrete segments of the species population, and all spatial units together define the species' indigenous range: the distribution of the species prior to major human impacts on its abundance or distribution. Commonly used markers for the start of human impacts include the year 1500 CE (estimate of the beginning of European expansion) or 1750 CE (approximate beginning of the Industrial Revolution). To maintain relevance to modern conservation, the indigenous range represents species distributions at a time point between the year 1500 CE and 1950 CE. Expected additional range, such as habitats that a species may begin to occupy under anticipated climate warming scenarios, may be used in calculating long-term future Green scores.

The Green Score is expressed as a percentage equal to:

$\frac{\sum_{S=1}^N W_S}{W_F*N} * 100$

Where W_{S} is the weight (integrity) of the spatial unit, N is the total number of spatial units and W_{F} is the weight of a functional unit (highest weight possible).

Representative values of assigned weights are 0, if the species is not present in the area, 3, if the species is present, 6, if the population is viable, and 9, if the population is assessed as functional, although depending on the exact criteria used by the assessor, the functional weight can be assigned to 8 or 10 and decimal weights may be used. The exact meaning of these terms varies by assessor and species, but the IUCN suggests conducting the assessment as would be done when assigning a regional Red List status, with the exception of assessing functionality, which is based on the ability of the population within the spatial unit to carry out natural processes, such as migration, the integrity of its interactions within its habitat, such as predator-prey relationships with other species, and its contributions to ecosystem processes within the unit, such as seed dispersal. Spatial units can represent reproductively isolated populations or subspecies, areas where the species faces a unique threat, division by ecosystem types the species inhabits or may be based on geographical features with some barrier to dispersal. National borders may also be considered when delineating spatial units. The definition and number of spatial units chosen by the assessor directly influences the Green Score and conservation metrics that are obtained.

A Green Score of 100% is defined for a fully recovered or non-depleted species that is present in all parts of its indigenous range (prior to any major human disturbance), each with viable populations that are ecologically functional, a score that may not be realistically attainable for many species even if they achieve their Recovery Potential.

=== Conservation metrics ===
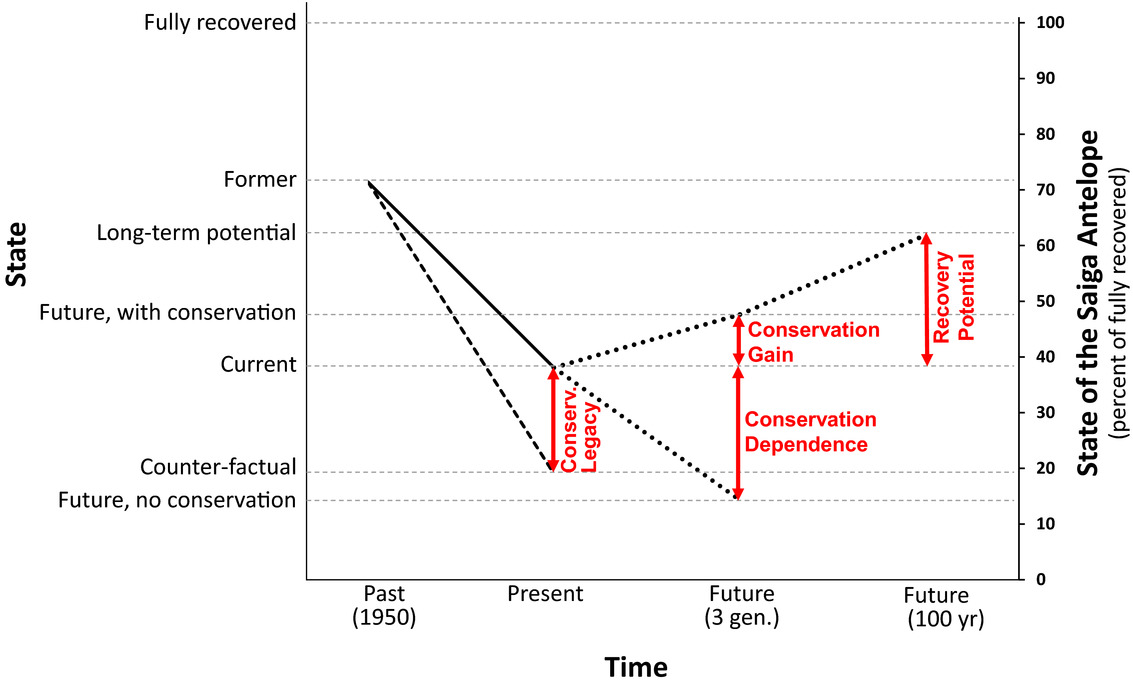
Example of four conservation metrics, in red, assessed in the IUCN Green Status of Species

A Green Status assessment also includes four conservation metrics that represent predicted changes in Green Score in different conservation scenarios over periods of time. They can be used to help assess the effectiveness of past, current and future conservation measures. The first metric is Conservation Legacy, which measures the difference in estimated Green Score that would be expected at the time of assessment (the present) if no conservation actions had been undertaken (counterfactual scenario) to the actual Green Score at the time of assessment. If no past conservation actions had occurred, the Conservation Legacy would be 0%. Conservation Dependence, the second metric, assesses the change in Green Scores between the present and the short-term future, defined as three generations of the species or 10 years, whichever is longer, if no conservation actions are undertaken over that time and all current programs are immediately stopped. Conservation Gain, the third metric, is the change in Green Scores between the present and short-term future with current and planned conservation action. Finally, Recovery Potential is the change in Green Score between the present and the long-term future, defined as 100 years after present, in an optimal conservation scenario.

The metrics can have zero and negative values. In the case of the Conservation Dependence and Conservation Gain metrics, values less than zero may be attributable to reliance on a static Green Score baseline that does not indicate whether the species is projected to decline or recover if threats to a species change in the short term. Version 2.0 of the Green Status of Species assessment introduced a dynamic current baseline that can be employed for the calculation of Conservation Dependence and Gain, using the predicted Green Score at 10 years given current conservation actions and those that are expected to go into effect within one year of the Green Status assessment.

=== Species Recovery Category ===
Species Recovery Categories are defined based on the Species Recovery Score (the Green Score at the time of the assessment), which is a point estimate (SRS_{best}), with a corresponding confidence interval (bounded by SRS_{max} and SRS_{min}). The Species Recovery Category at the time of the assessment is defined as follows:

Category based on Species Recovery Score best estimates and uncertainty
Species Recovery Category	Criteria
Indeterminate	SRS_{max} − SRS_{min} > 40%
Non-depleted	SRS_{best} = 100% and Conservation Legacy = 0%
Fully recovered	SRS_{best} = 100%
Slightly depleted	SRS_{best} > 80%
Moderately depleted	SRS_{best} > 50%
Largely depleted	SRS_{best} > 20%
Critically depleted	SRS_{best} > 0%
Extinct in the wild	SRS_{best} = 0%

The conservation impact metrics are also each expressed as point estimates with their own confidence intervals and verbal descriptors. The conservation impact categories—high, medium, low, zero, negative and indeterminate—have criteria based on absolute change in Green Score (magnitude of the conservation metric), change relative to the baseline present-day Green Score or any benefit that prevents extinction, in cases of species with high conservation needs.

While the Green Status and the Red List statuses showed a moderate negative correlation among species assessed in a Green Status pilot, with progressively more depleted species being more likely to be threatened with extinction, among conservation metrics, only Recovery Potential showed differences between IUCN Red List categories, with currently imperiled species generally possessing a higher Recovery Potential than the species of Least Concern.

== See also ==
- Ecological niche
- Ecotype
