= Ponticyclops =

Conservation status
- Conservation Dependent (IUCN 2.3)

Scientific classification
- Kingdom: Animalia
- Phylum: Arthropoda
- Class: Copepoda
- Order: Cyclopoida
- Family: Cyclopidae
- Genus: Ponticyclops; Reid, 1987
- Species: P. boscoi

Binomial name
- Ponticyclops boscoi Reid, 1987

Genus of crustaceans

Ponticyclops is a genus of copepods in the family Cyclopidae. It is monotypic, being represented by the single species Ponticyclops boscoi. It is endemic to Brazil, where its natural habitat is swamps.
