= Attheyella yemanjae =

Conservation status
- Conservation Dependent (IUCN 2.3)

Scientific classification
- Kingdom: Animalia
- Phylum: Arthropoda
- Class: Copepoda
- Order: Harpacticoida
- Family: Canthocamptidae
- Genus: Attheyella
- Species: A. yemanjae

Binomial name
- Attheyella yemanjae Reid, 1993

Species of crustacean

Attheyella yemanjae is a species of copepod in the family Canthocamptidae. It is only known from the type locality, which is the Campo Úmido da Onça in Brazil's Distrito Federal (15°56′40″S 47°54′20″W). It is listed as conservation dependent on the IUCN Red List. The specific epithet yemanjae commemorates Yemanjá, the "beneficent and terrible goddess of the sea and the patroness of those who work on the waters" in Candombé mythology.
