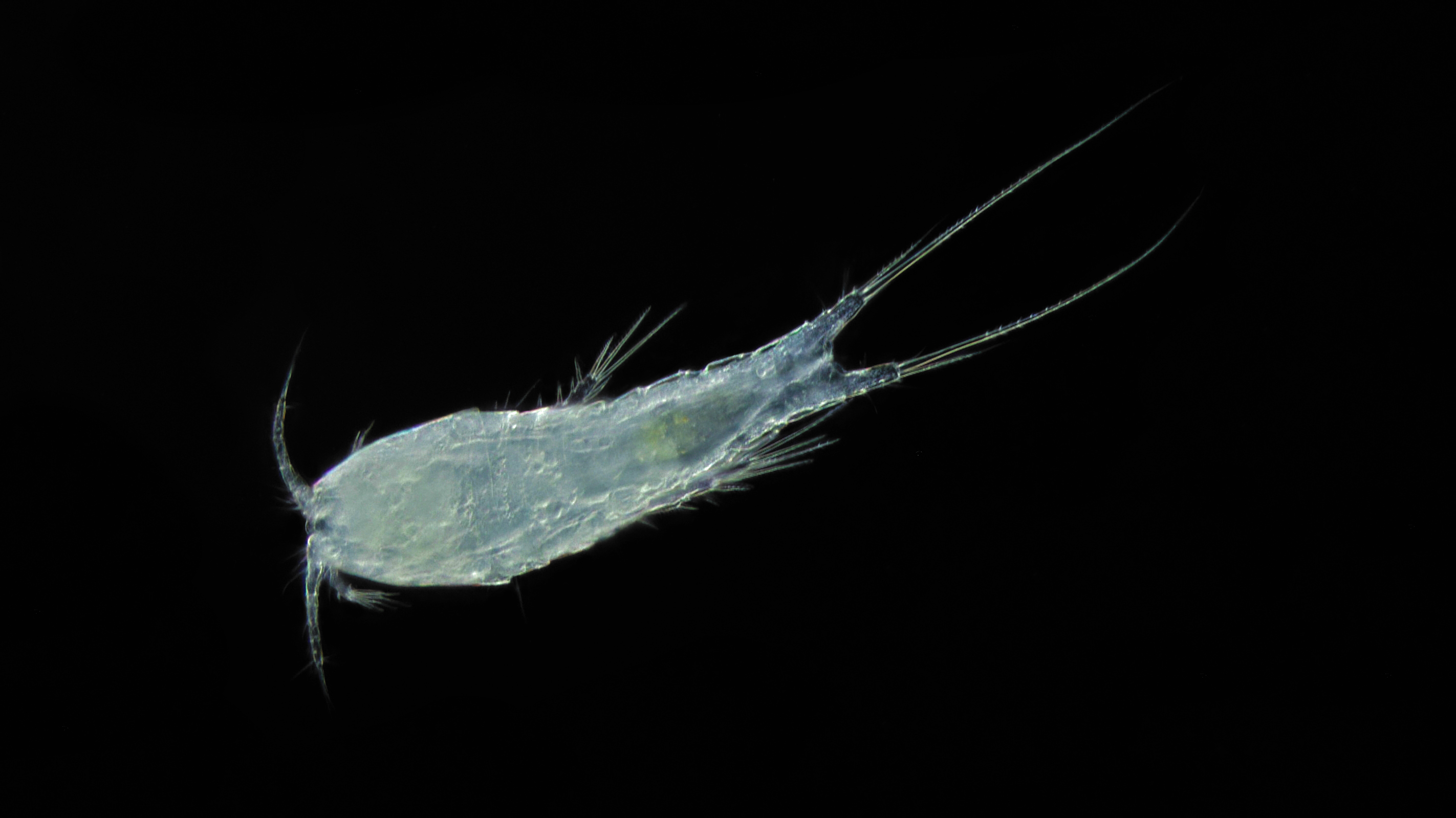
- Female specimen of C. glacialis from the Lena River.

Scientific classification
- Kingdom: Animalia
- Phylum: Arthropoda
- Clade: Pancrustacea
- Class: Copepoda
- Order: Harpacticoida
- Family: Canthocamptidae
- Genus: Canthocamptus; Westwood, 1836

= Canthocamptus =

Genus of crustaceans

Canthocamptus is a genus of copepods (small crustaceans) that live in freshwater of Holarctic. There are 22 different species of Canthocamptus.

== Species ==
- Canthocamptus assimilis Kiefer, 1931
- Canthocamptus baikalensis Borutsky, 1930
- Canthocamptus bulbifer Borutsky, 1952
- Canthocamptus campaneri
- Canthocamptus carinatus Shen & Sung, 1973
- Canthocamptus glacialis Lilljeborg, 1902
- Canthocamptus iaponicus Brehm, 1927
- Canthocamptus kitaurensis Kikuchi in Ishida & Kikuchi, 1999
- Canthocamptus kunzi Apostolov, 1969
- Canthocamptus latus Borutsky, 1947
- Canthocamptus longifurcatus Borutsky, 1947
- Canthocamptus macrosetifer Ishida in Ishida & Kikuchi, 1999
- Canthocamptus microstaphylinus Wolf in Lauterborn & Wolf, 1909
- Canthocamptus oregonensis M. S. Wilson, 1956
- Canthocamptus robertcokeri M. S. Wilson, 1958
- Canthocamptus sinuus Coker, 1934
- Canthocamptus staphylinoides Pearse, 1905
- Canthocamptus staphylinus (Jurine, 1820)
- Canthocamptus takkobuensis Ishida in Ishida & Kikuchi, 1999
- Canthocamptus vagus Coker & Morgan, 1940
- Canthocamptus verestschagini (Borutsky, 1931)
- Canthocamptus waldemarschneideri Novikov & Sharafutdinova, 2022
