= Least-concern species =

IUCN conservation category

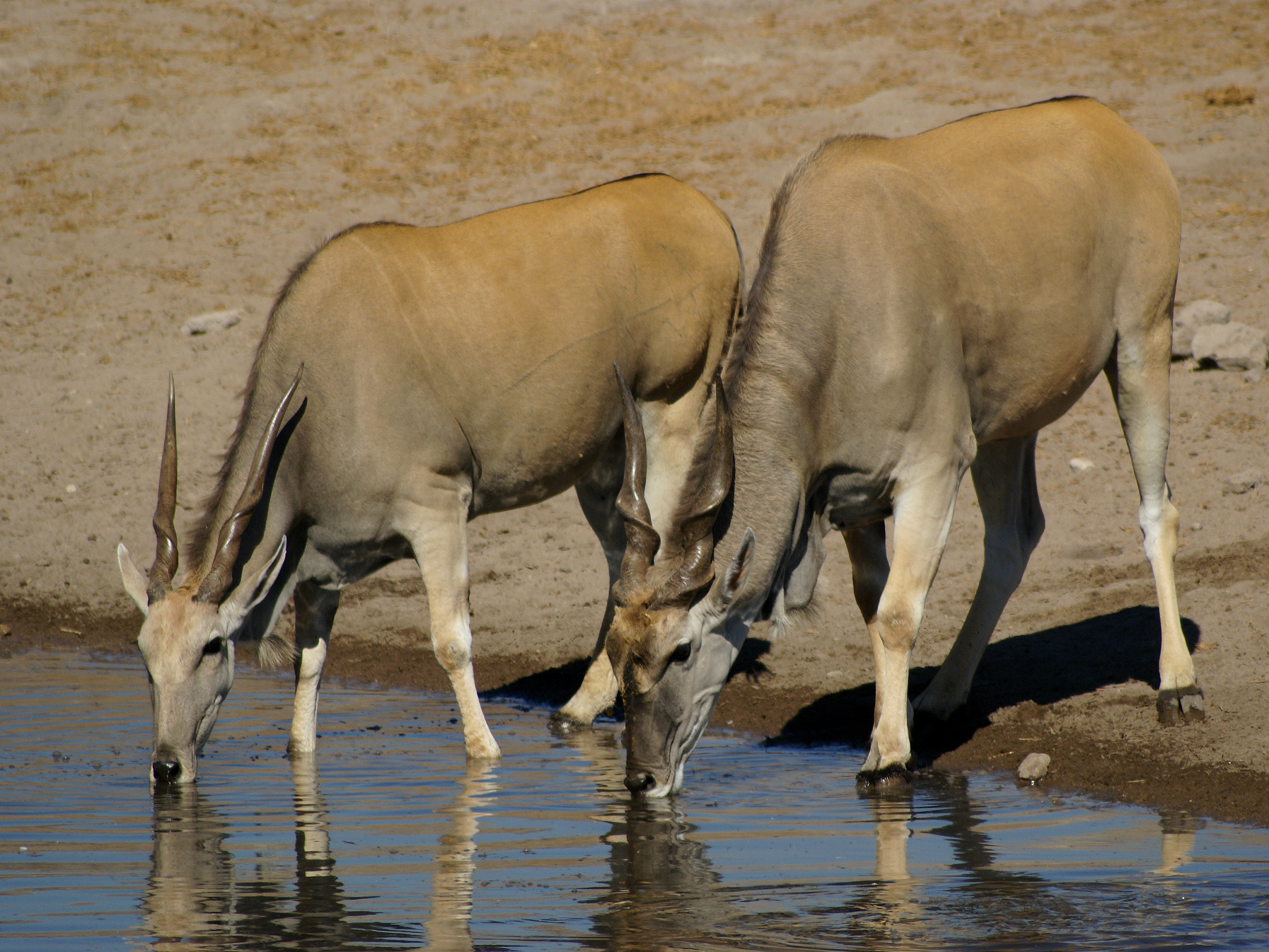
Taurotragus oryx, the common eland, is a species with a conservation status of least concern.

A least-concern species is a species that has been evaluated and categorized by the International Union for Conservation of Nature (IUCN) as not being a focus of wildlife conservation because the specific species is still plentiful in the wild. They do not qualify as threatened, near threatened, or (before 2001) conservation dependent.

Species cannot be assigned the least concern category unless they have had their population status evaluated. That is, adequate information is needed to make a direct, or indirect, assessment of its risk of extinction based on its distribution or population status.

== Evaluation ==
Since 2001 the category has had the abbreviation "LC", following the IUCN 2001 Categories & Criteria (version 3.1). Before 2001 "least concern" was a subcategory of the "Lower Risk" category and assigned the code "LR/lc" or lc. Around 20% of least concern taxa (3261 of 15,636) in the IUCN database still use the code "LR/lc", which indicates they have not been re-evaluated since 2000.

== Number of species ==
While "least concern" is not considered a red listed category by the IUCN, the 2006 IUCN Red List still assigns the category to 15,636 taxa. The number of animal species listed in this category totals 14,033 (which also includes several undescribed species such as a frog from the genus Philautus). There are also 101 animal subspecies listed and 1500 plant taxa (1410 species, 55 subspecies, and 35 varieties). No fungi or protista have the classification, though only four species in those kingdoms have been evaluated by the IUCN. Humans were formally assessed as a species of least concern in 2008.

== See also ==
- Conservation status
