= Ian Mark Turner =

British botanist

Ian Mark Turner is a British botanist born in 1963.
