= Conservation-dependent species =

IUCN conservation category

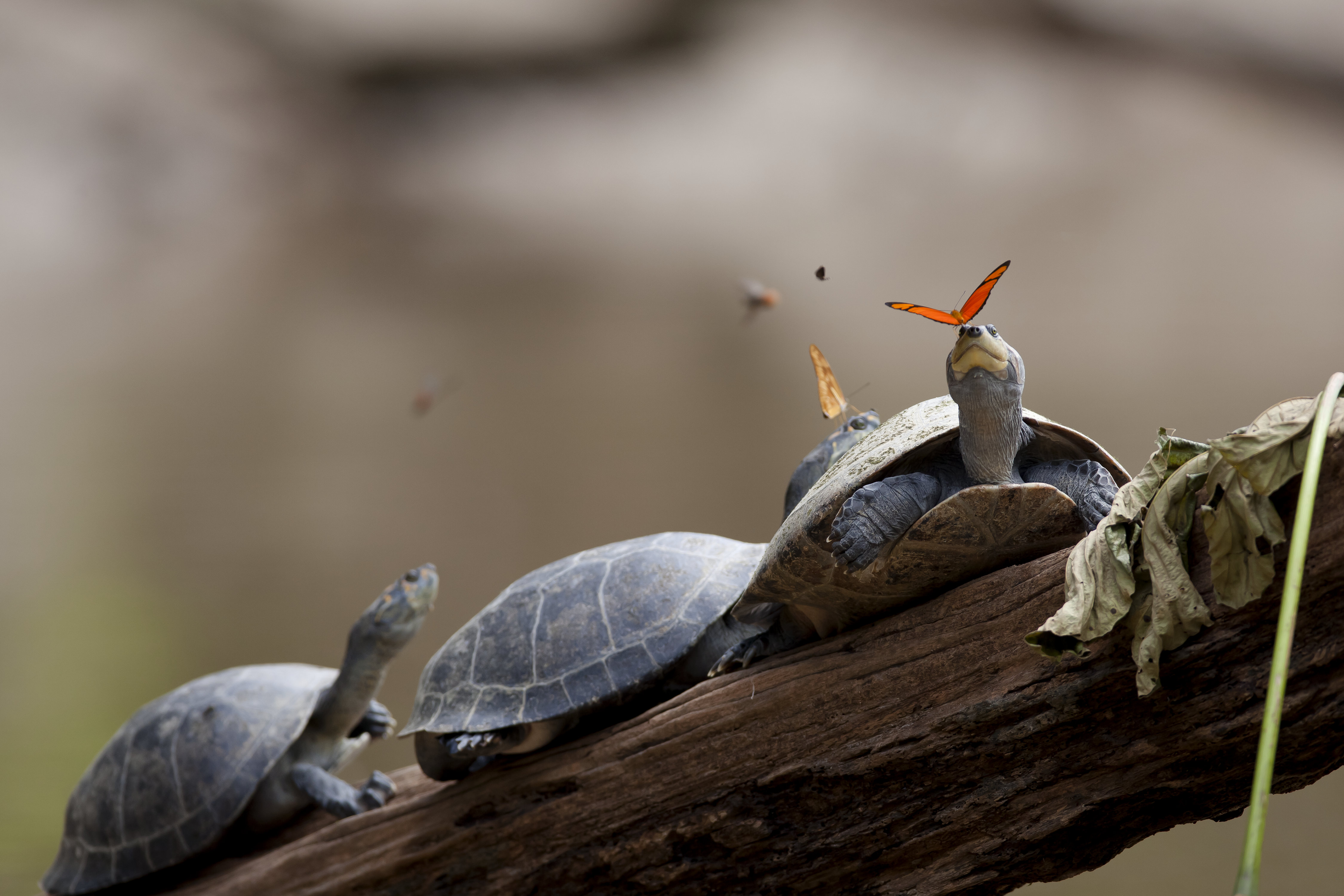
The Arrau turtle, which has slow maturity rate and is subject to poaching, is conservation dependent thanks to conservation efforts.

A visualization of the categories in the no-longer used "IUCN 1994 Categories & Criteria (version 2.3)", with conservation dependent (LR/cd) highlighted. The category was folded into the "near threatened" category in the 2001 revision, but some species which have not been re-evaluated retain the assessment.

A conservation-dependent species is a species which has been categorized as "Conservation Dependent" ("LR/cd") by the International Union for Conservation of Nature (IUCN), as dependent on conservation efforts to prevent it from becoming endangered. A species that is reliant on the conservation attempts of humans is considered conservation dependent. Such species must be the focus of a continuing species-specific and/or habitat-specific conservation program, the cessation of which would result in the species qualifying for one of the threatened categories within a period of five years. The determination of status is constantly monitored and can change.

This category is part of the IUCN 1994 Categories & Criteria (version 2.3), which is no longer used in evaluation of taxa, but persists in the IUCN Red List for taxa evaluated prior to 2001, when version 3.1 was first used. Using the 2001 (version 3.1) system these taxa are classed as near threatened, but those that have not been re-evaluated remain with the "Conservation Dependent" category.

Conservation-dependent species require maintenance additional to the use of the United States Endangered Species Act of 1973. This act is said to protect species from extinction by concerns and acts of conservation.

== Challenges ==
Conservation-dependent species rely on population connectivity between humans and animals to maintain their life. Connectivity is based in regard to the federal regulatory provisions that protect the species and its habitat. Habitats and species are difficult to conserve when they are not susceptible to the regulations put in place. It is also seen that laws and acts have flaws that cause gaps in their motive. The Endangered Species Act fails to account for biological ecosystem conservation and threats to a species presence. Conservation in these conditions causes data gaps and leads to the depletion of species.

Funding of the federal provisions show to be a major concern when efforts are being made to conserve species. Legal members who don't agree on where funding should go cause more harm to the conservation-dependent species by making no effort for restoration. Despite legal efforts for defining a restoration program and setting regulatory provisions, conservation-dependent species are still in danger.

== Flora vs fauna conservation methods ==
While conservation dependent plants and animals fall under the same risk status in the environment different methods are used to protect them. Conservation dependent animals are typically protected by recovery plans and agreements for conservation by the government. Plants that are conservation dependent have less protection behind them as the major method for conservation is keeping a habitat healthy. In order to do so, keeping areas uncivilized and minimizing pollution emissions are predictable solutions. Keeping the flora (plants) and fauna (animals) in their region out of the conservation dependent category is the main goal of these methods.

== Threatened categories ==
Species that were considered Conservation Dependent were under the lower risk category of status in the IUCN Red List of Threatened Species. The category of species may change when reassessed. The lower risk status section had three categories:

- Near Threatened LR/nt (now NT)
- Conservation Dependent LR/cd (now merged with NT)
- Least Concern LR/lc (now LC)

== Green Status metric ==
From 2020, some IUCN Red List species assessments began to optionally include a "Green Status", which is a standardized assessment of the global recovery of the species. This assessment reintroduces a systematic "Conservation Dependence" measure to the Red List, but is now separate to the assessed category of the species. The metric compares calculated scores for the short-term (10 years) future of a species with and without conservation actions. This metric allows recognition of species whose current conservation status is dependent on continued conservation actions.

The Green Status assessment is an optional part of a IUCN Red List species assessment. It provides a global standard for measuring species recovery and assessing conservation impact.

== Conservation attempts ==
In fisheries around the world, there is a list of rules that people must follow which are in place as a conservation effort. These rules protect the conservation dependent listing of scalloped hammerhead shark (Sphyrna lewini) under the EPBC Act is one major step for conservation of endangered species.

- Reporting catch by phone: fishers must report their catch of a shark to QDAF's automated interactive voice response.
- Species specific catch and discard information in logbooks: all catches of sharks must be recorded in a log book.
- Data validation: one hour after docking when there is a shark on board, fisheries officers are allowed to inspect boat and catches.

== Conservation-dependent animals ==
Examples of conservation-dependent species include the California ground cricket.

As of December 2015, there remains 209 conservation-dependent plant species and 29 conservation-dependent animal species.

As of January 2026, the IUCN still lists 13 conservation-dependent animal species, and one conservation-dependent subpopulations or stocks.

=== Arthropods ===
- Mono Lake brine shrimp
- Attheyella yemanjae
- Canthocamptus campaneri
- Metacyclops campestris
- Murunducaris juneae
- Muscocyclops bidentatus
- Muscocyclops therasiae
- California ground cricket
- Ponticyclops boscoi
- Coachella Valley grasshopper
- Black-headed Jerusalem cricket
- Thermocyclops parvus

=== Reptiles ===
- Arrau turtle

== EPBC Act ==
In Australia, the Environment Protection and Biodiversity Conservation Act 1999 still uses a "Conservation Dependent" category for classifying fauna and flora species. Species recognized as "Conservation Dependent" do not receive special protection, as they are not considered "matters of national environmental significance under the EPBC Act". Any assemblage of species may be listed as a "threatened ecological community" under the EPBC Act. Fauna may be classified under this category if its flora is directly threatened.

The legislation uses categories similar to those of the IUCN 1994 Categories & Criteria. It does not, however, have a near threatened category or any other "lower risk" categories.

As of December 2018, eight species of fishes have received the status under the act:

- Orange roughy (Hoplostethus atlanticus)
- Silver gemfish (Rexea solandri)
- School shark (Galeorhinus galeus)
- Southern bluefin tuna (Thunnus maccoyii)
- Southern dogfish (Centrophorus zeehaani)
- Dumb gulper shark (Centrophorus harrissoni)
- Blue warehou (Seriolella brama)
- Scalloped hammerhead (Sphyrna lewini)

No species of flora has been given the category under the EPBC Act.

== See also ==
- Conservation-reliant species
- IUCN Red List conservation dependent species, ordered by taxonomic rank.
- Category:IUCN Red List conservation dependent species, ordered alphabetically.
