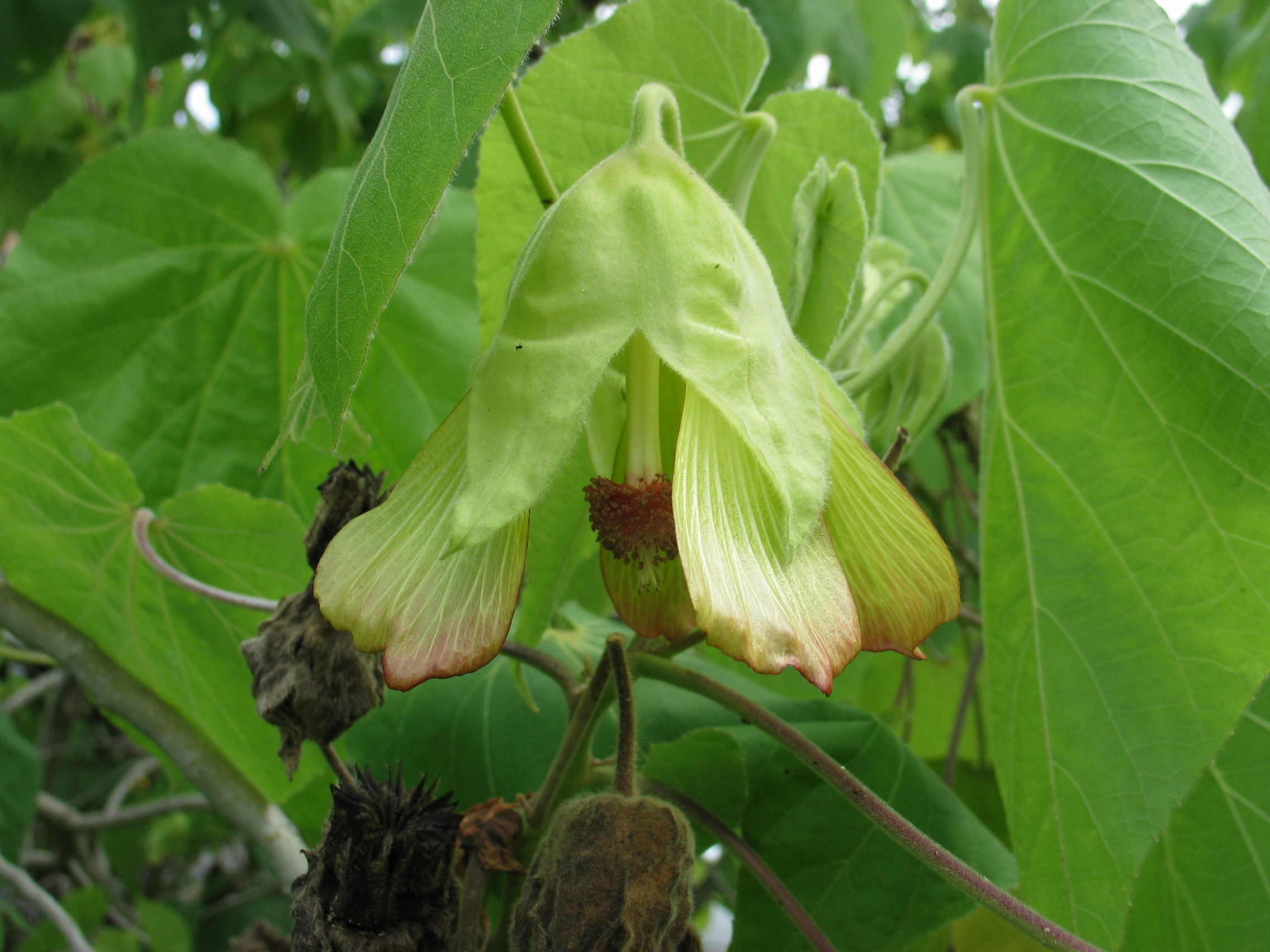

Conservation status
- Critically Endangered (IUCN 3.1)

Scientific classification
- Kingdom: Plantae
- Clade: Tracheophytes
- Clade: Angiosperms
- Clade: Eudicots
- Clade: Rosids
- Order: Malvales
- Family: Malvaceae
- Genus: Abutilon
- Species: A. sandwicense

Binomial name
- Abutilon sandwicense (O.Deg.) Christoph.

= Abutilon sandwicense =

Greenflower Indian mallow

Species of flowering plant

Abutilon sandwicense, commonly known as the greenflower Indian mallow, is a species of flowering plant in the mallow family, Malvaceae, that is endemic to the island of Oʻahu, Hawaii, in the United States. It inhabits dry forests on the slopes of the Waiʻanae Range at elevations of 400–600 m (1,300–2,000 ft). Associated plants include lama (Diospyros sandwicensis), ēlama (D. hillebrandii), māmaki (Pipturus albidus), kalia (Elaeocarpus bifidus), āulu (Sapindus oahuensis), olopua (Nestegis sandwicensis), and alaheʻe (Psydrax odorata). Greenflower Indian mallow is a shrub, reaching a height of 1.5–3 m (4.9–9.8 ft). It is threatened by habitat loss.
