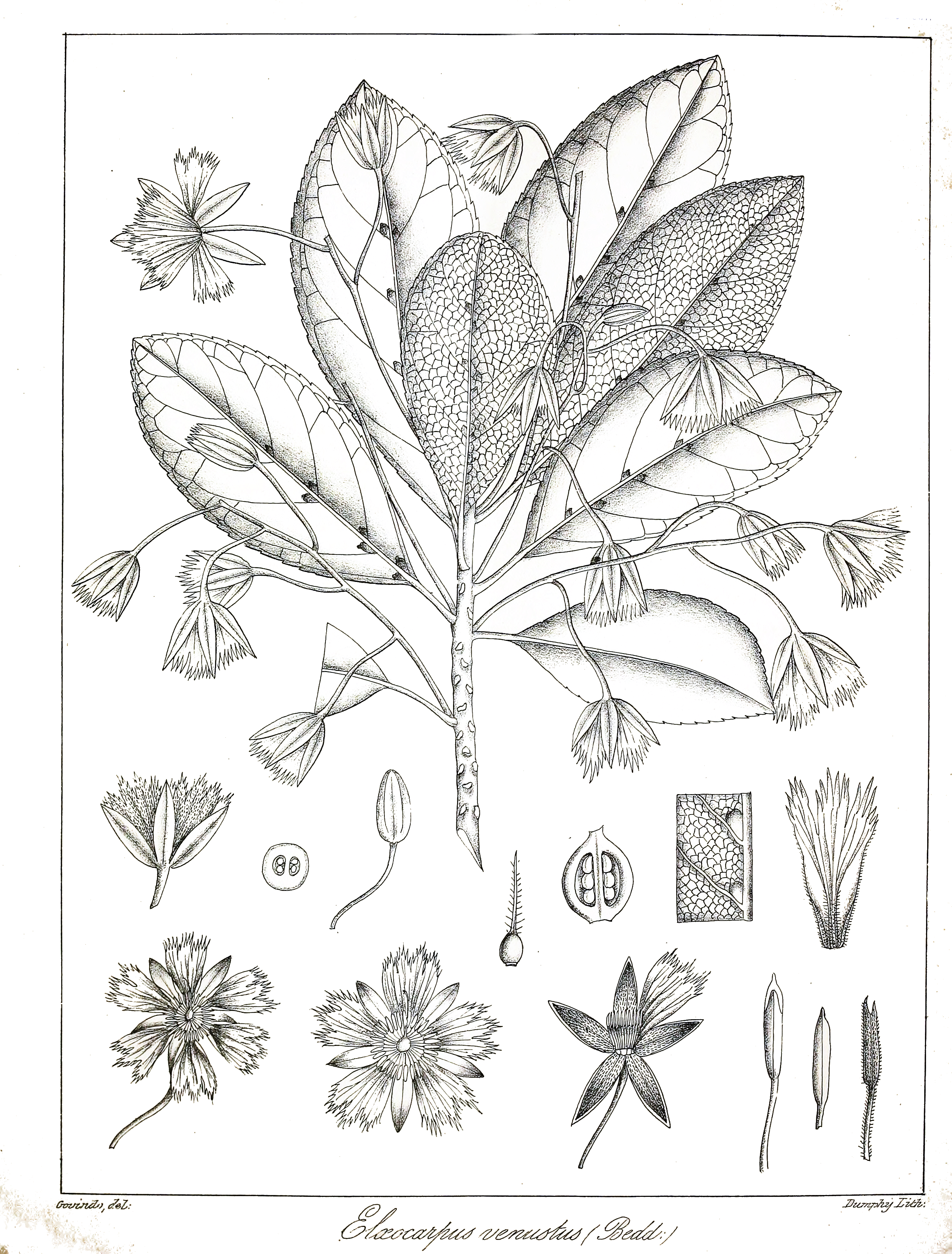

Conservation status
- Critically Endangered (IUCN 3.1)

Scientific classification
- Kingdom: Plantae
- Clade: Tracheophytes
- Clade: Angiosperms
- Clade: Eudicots
- Clade: Rosids
- Order: Oxalidales
- Family: Elaeocarpaceae
- Genus: Elaeocarpus
- Species: E. venustus

Binomial name
- Elaeocarpus venustus Bedd.

= Elaeocarpus venustus =

Species of flowering plant endemic to India

Elaeocarpus venustus is a species of flowering plant in the Elaeocarpaceae family. It is found only in the Western Ghats of Tamil Nadu state in southern India. It is Critically Endangered, and threatened by habitat loss.

== Description ==
Elaeocarpus venustus is a medium-sized tree. It has stilt roots, an adaptation to its swamp habitats.

== Range and habitat ==
Elaeocarpus venustus is known only from Chimunji, Muthukuzhivayal, Upper Kodayar, and nearby areas of Kalakkad Mundanthurai Tiger Reserve, which is part of Agasthyamalai Biosphere Reserve. It has an estimated area of occupancy (AOO) of 24 km^{2}, and an extent of occurrence (EOO) of 59.8 km^{2}.

It grows only in montane freshwater swamp forests growing along hill streams in montane evergreen rain forests from 1,200 to 1,300 metres elevation. Its habitats include open swamps bordered by E. venustus, monospecific swamp forests of E. venustus, and mosaics of primary forest and swamp vegetation. Associated trees include Aglaia elaeagnoidea, Calophyllum austroindicum, Cullenia exarillata, Myristica dactyloides, Elaeocarpus munroi, Elaeocarpus tuberculatus, Garcinia travancorica, Garcinia rubroechinata, Holigarna nigra, Syzygium mundagam, and Syzygium rama-varmae.

== Conservation ==
Although the population is within a protected area, it faces habitat loss and fragmentation from forest clearing for hydroelectric dams, road construction, and expansion of tea, coffee, and eucalyptus plantations. A 2013 survey of the known populations found few intermediate-sized plants and low regeneration.
