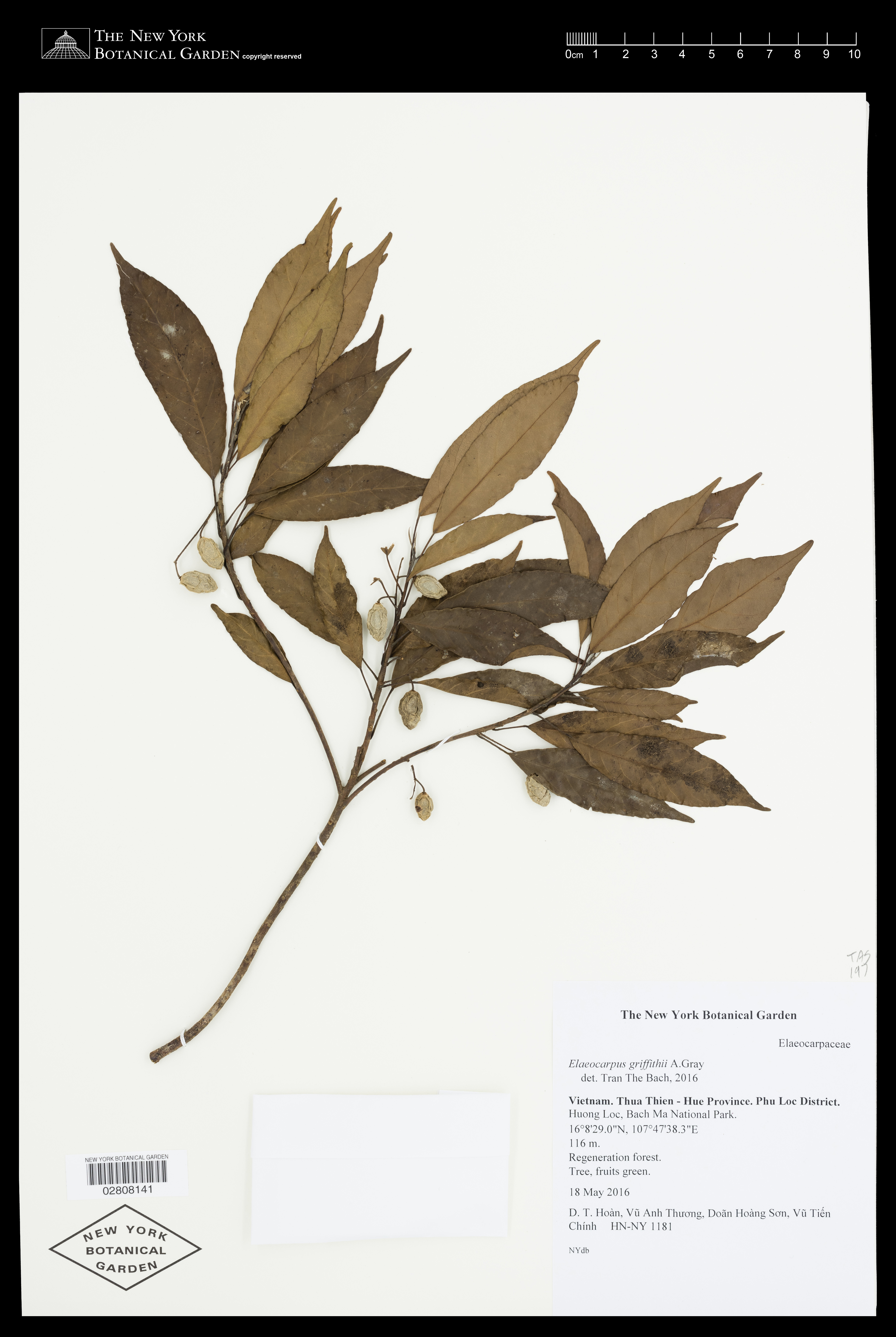

Scientific classification
- Kingdom: Plantae
- Clade: Tracheophytes
- Clade: Angiosperms
- Clade: Eudicots
- Clade: Rosids
- Order: Oxalidales
- Family: Elaeocarpaceae
- Genus: Elaeocarpus
- Species: E. griffithii

Binomial name
- Elaeocarpus griffithii (Wight) A.Gray

Synonyms
- Elaeocarpus argyrodes Hance; Elaeocarpus leucobotryus (Miq.) F.Muell.; Elaeocarpus trichanthera (Griff.) W.Theob.; Monocera griffithii Wight; Monocera holopetala Turcz.; Monocera leucobotrya Miq.; Monocera paniculata Wall. ex A.Gray; Monocera trichanthera Griff.

= Elaeocarpus griffithii =

Species of flowering plant from Southeast Asia

Elaeocarpus griffithii is a tree in the family Elaeocarpaceae. It is found in parts of Island and Mainland Southeast Asia. It is used in construction, as firewood and in dyeing.

== Description ==
It has smooth bark, and grows 10–25 m (33–82 ft) tall in dense and flooded forests.

== Distribution ==
The tree is found in Borneo, Sumatera, Peninsular Malaysia, Thailand, Cambodia, Vietnam, Laos and Myanmar.

== Habitat ==
The tree occurs in ombrotrophic (rain-fed) coastal peat swamp forest in Kubu Raya Regency, and in the ombrotrophic peatland forest of Berasap and Tulak in the Ketapang Regency, of West Kalimantan, Indonesia. In the southernmost province of Thailand, Narathiwat, within the To Daeng peat swamp forest, Elaeocarpus griffithii is found among the primary forest, but not the secondary formations. The species grows in choams (Khmer, permanently inundated evergreen swamp forests) of northern Stung Treng Province, Cambodia, occurring in both seasonally and permanently inundated areas. The species is one of the most common species of tree in the wetland swamp forests of the Mekong floodplain of southern Vietnam, along with Barringtonia acutangula, Diospyros cambodiana, Elaeocarpus hygrophilus, Hydnocarpus castaneus, and Mallotus plicatus.

== Ecology ==
While investigating the effects of forest degradation (clearfelling and other old-growth forest reduction) on the peatland forest of Berasap and Tulak in the Ketapang Regency of West Kalimantan, Astiani showed increasingly reduced density of Elaeocarpus griffithii as degradation increased. In another study looking at waterflow from trees to the soil, conducted in coastal peat swamp forest of Kubu Raya Regency, West Kalimantan, Elaeocarpus griffithii was found to have high stemflow down to the soil. This is consistent with other smooth-barked taxa, as opposed to coarse- and mid-barked taxa.

== Vernacular names ==
The plant is named in various ways in a number of languages: mempening (Kabu Raya Regency, Kalimantan), luët chum, rumdé:nh phluk, chorm nhi (Khmer); côm tầng, côm griffith (Vietnamese)

== Uses ==
The wood is used in construction and as firewood in Cambodia, and in construction as well as a source of tannin for dyeing in Vietnam.

== History ==
The species was first described by the eminent US botanist Asa Gray in his 1854 publication within the official report of the Wilkes Expedition (1838–42) of the Pacific and surrounding lands.
