= Elaeocarpus simaluensis =

Conservation status
- Vulnerable (IUCN 2.3)

Scientific classification
- Kingdom: Plantae
- Clade: Tracheophytes
- Clade: Angiosperms
- Clade: Eudicots
- Clade: Rosids
- Order: Oxalidales
- Family: Elaeocarpaceae
- Genus: Elaeocarpus
- Species: E. simaluensis

Binomial name
- Elaeocarpus simaluensis Weibel

Species of flowering plant endemic to Sumatra

Elaeocarpus simaluensis is a species of flowering plant in the Elaeocarpaceae family. It is found only in Sumatra.
