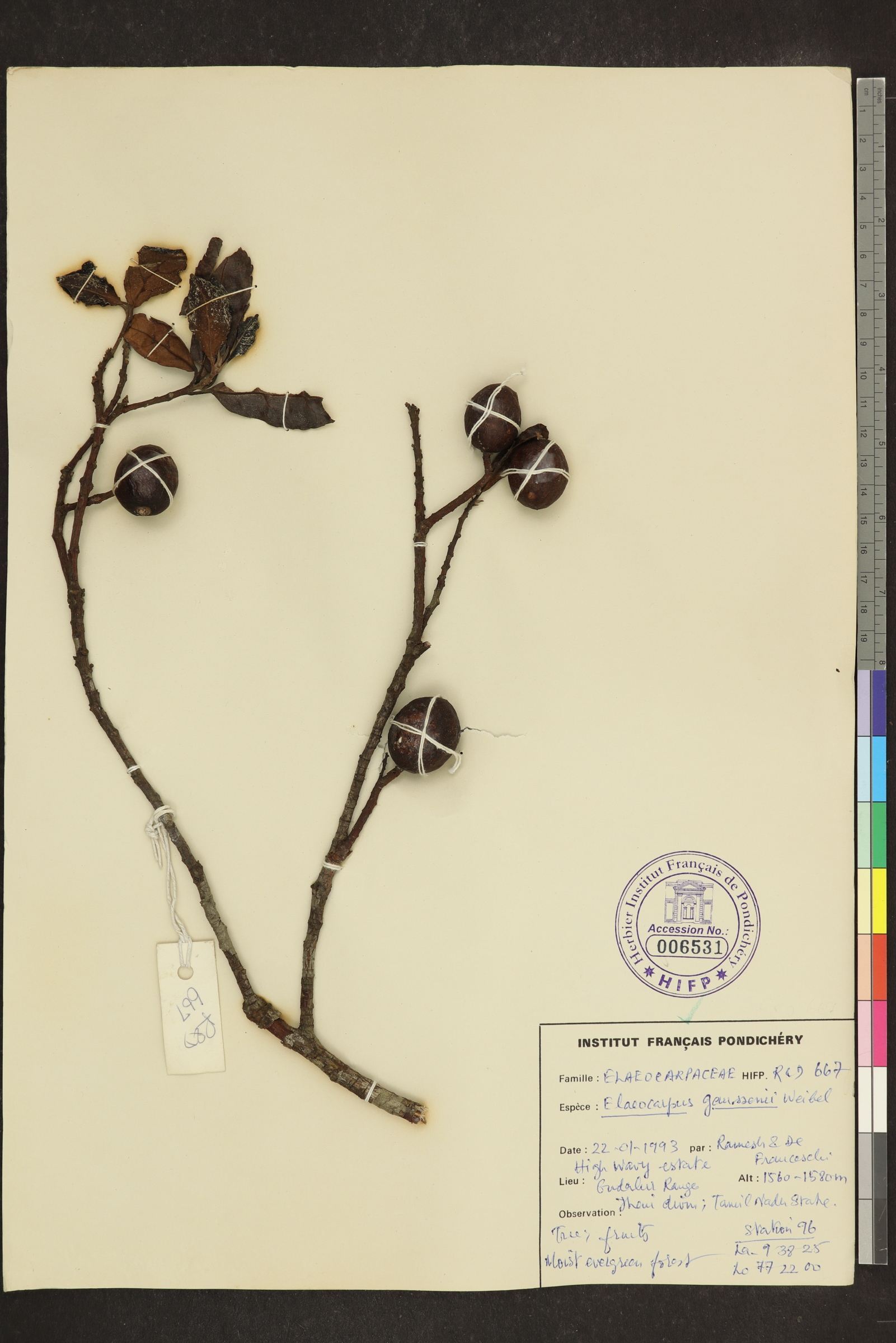

Conservation status
- Critically Endangered (IUCN 3.1)

Scientific classification
- Kingdom: Plantae
- Clade: Tracheophytes
- Clade: Angiosperms
- Clade: Eudicots
- Clade: Rosids
- Order: Oxalidales
- Family: Elaeocarpaceae
- Genus: Elaeocarpus
- Species: E. gaussenii

Binomial name
- Elaeocarpus gaussenii Weibel

= Elaeocarpus gaussenii =

Species of flowering plant

Elaeocarpus gaussenii is a critically endangered species of flowering plant in the Elaeocarpaceae family. It is found only in the Western Ghats of Tamil Nadu, India. It is threatened by habitat loss.

The species was described by Raymond Weibel in 1972.
