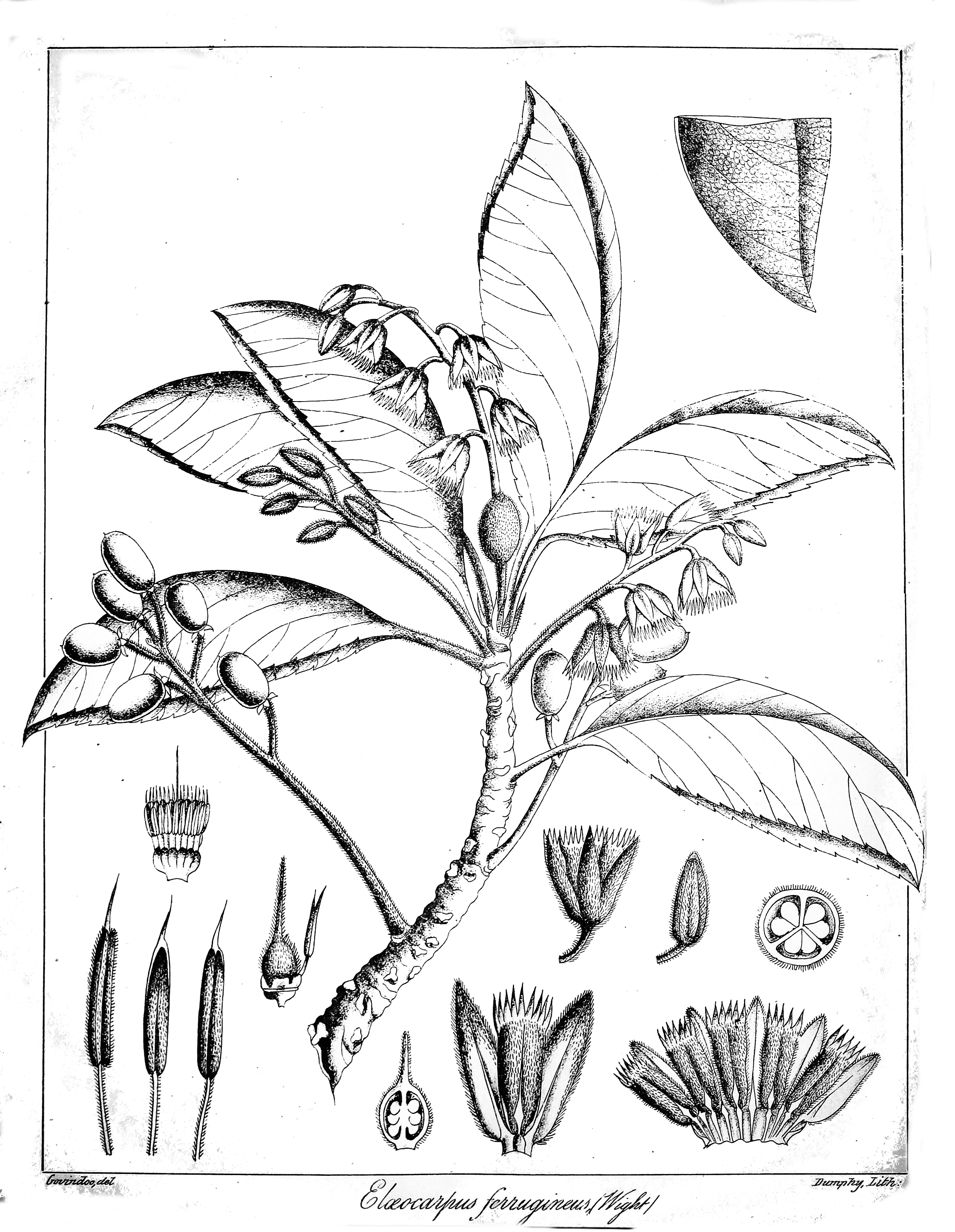

Conservation status
- Least Concern (IUCN 3.1)

Scientific classification
- Kingdom: Plantae
- Clade: Tracheophytes
- Clade: Angiosperms
- Clade: Eudicots
- Clade: Rosids
- Order: Oxalidales
- Family: Elaeocarpaceae
- Genus: Elaeocarpus
- Species: E. ferrugineus

Binomial name
- Elaeocarpus ferrugineus (Jack) Steud.

Synonyms
- Elaeocarpus jackianus Wall. ex King; Elaeocarpus jackii F.Muell.; Monocera ferruginea Jack

= Elaeocarpus ferrugineus =

Species of flowering plant endemic to Malaysia

Elaeocarpus ferrugineus is a species of flowering plant in the family Elaeocarpaceae. It is a tree endemic to Peninsular Malaysia which grows primarily in the wet tropical biome.
