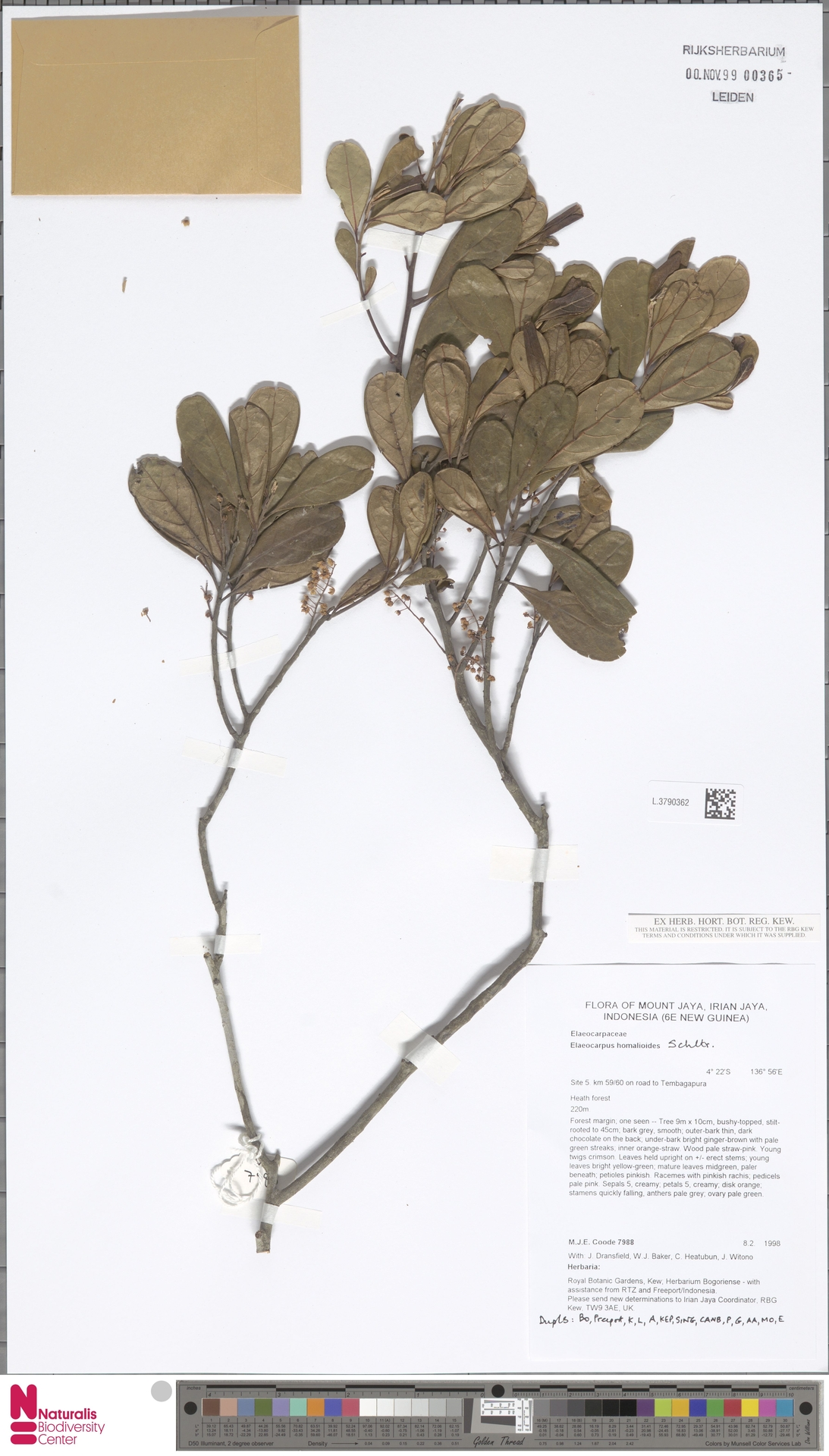

Conservation status
- Least Concern (IUCN 3.1)

Scientific classification
- Kingdom: Plantae
- Clade: Embryophytes
- Clade: Tracheophytes
- Clade: Spermatophytes
- Clade: Angiosperms
- Clade: Eudicots
- Clade: Rosids
- Order: Oxalidales
- Family: Elaeocarpaceae
- Genus: Elaeocarpus
- Species: E. homalioides

Binomial name
- Elaeocarpus homalioides Schltr.

= Elaeocarpus homalioides =

Species of flowering plant

Elaeocarpus homalioides is a species of flowering plant in the Elaeocarpaceae family. It is a tree endemic to New Guinea, where it is found in both West Papua (Indonesia) and Papua New Guinea. It grows 10–20 metres tall in lower montane forest from 1,400 to 1,500 metres elevation.

The species was described by Rudolf Schlechter in 1916.
