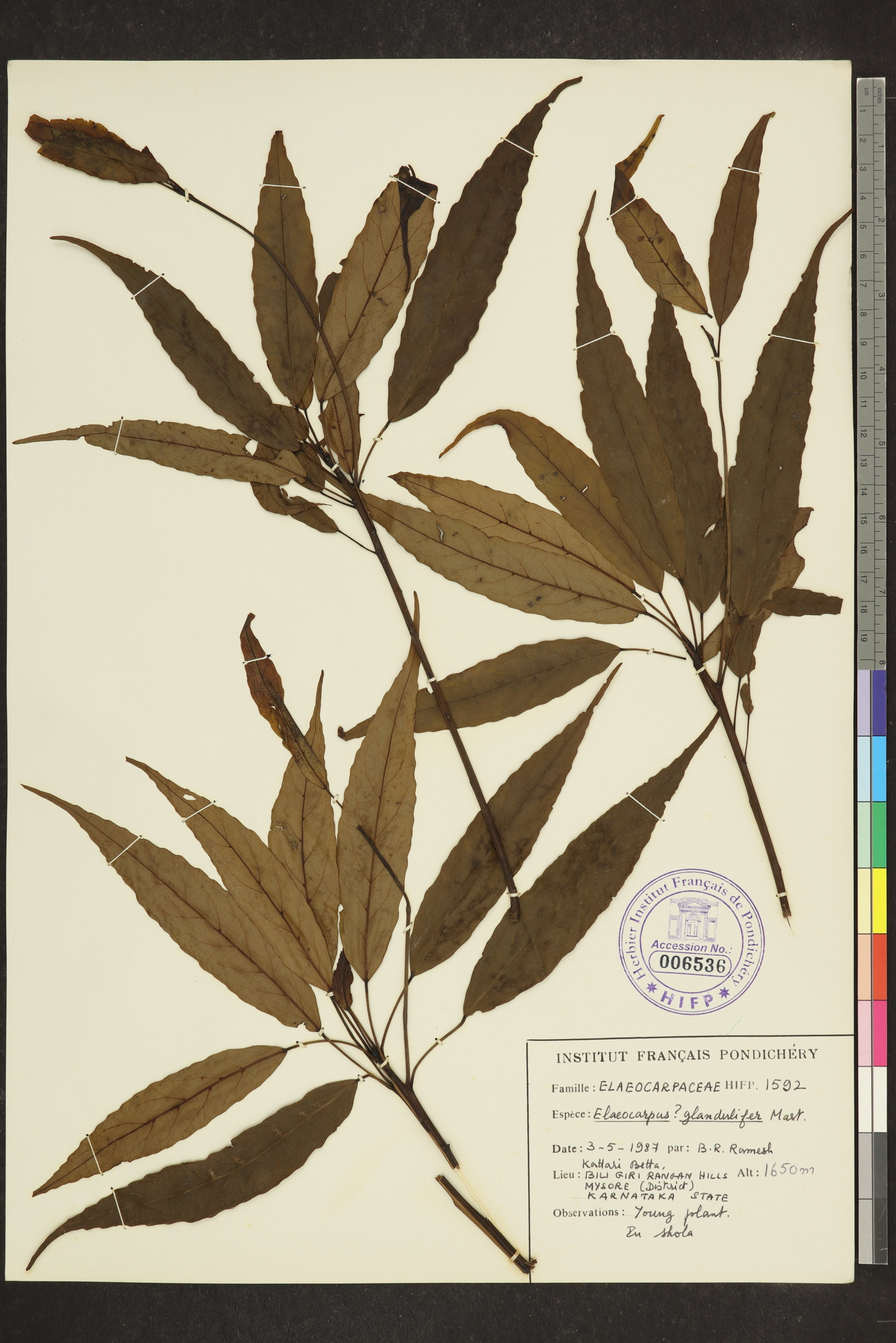

Conservation status
- Vulnerable (IUCN 2.3)

Scientific classification
- Kingdom: Plantae
- Clade: Tracheophytes
- Clade: Angiosperms
- Clade: Eudicots
- Clade: Rosids
- Order: Oxalidales
- Family: Elaeocarpaceae
- Genus: Elaeocarpus
- Species: E. glandulifer

Binomial name
- Elaeocarpus glandulifer (Hook.) Mast.

Synonyms
- Monocera glandulifera Hook. ex Wight

= Elaeocarpus glandulifer =

Species of flowering plant

Elaeocarpus glandulifer is a species of flowering plant in the family Elaeocarpaceae. It is endemic to Sri Lanka, mainly in South-western areas.
