= Elaeocarpus thorelii =

Scientific classification
- Kingdom: Plantae
- Clade: Tracheophytes
- Clade: Angiosperms
- Clade: Eudicots
- Clade: Rosids
- Order: Oxalidales
- Family: Elaeocarpaceae
- Genus: Elaeocarpus
- Species: E. thorelii

Binomial name
- Elaeocarpus thorelii Pierre

Species of flowering plant endemic to Cambodia

Elaeocarpus thorelii is a tree in the family Elaeocarpaceae, endemic to Cambodia, and used for its wood.

== Description and habitat ==
The species grows 10–15 m (33–49 ft) tall in dense/closed forests. It has rough bark. On the Bokor Plateau of Preah Monivong Bokor National Park, Cambodia, the plant is a rare small tree, found at about 970 m (3,180 ft) elevation.

== Distribution ==
It is endemic to Cambodia, most commonly in the provinces of Kompong Speu and Kompong Chhnang.

== Vernacular names ==
Elaeocarpus thorelii is called krâmâr in Khmer, the name is an allusion to its rough bark.

== Uses ==
The wood of the tree is used in construction and as firewood.

== History ==
The French botanist Jean Baptiste Louis Pierre, who specialised in Asian flora, described the plant in his Flore Forestiere de la Cochinchine in 1885, naming this species after Clovis Thorel.
