= Elaeocarpus miriensis =

Conservation status
- Vulnerable (IUCN 2.3)

Scientific classification
- Kingdom: Plantae
- Clade: Tracheophytes
- Clade: Angiosperms
- Clade: Eudicots
- Clade: Rosids
- Order: Oxalidales
- Family: Elaeocarpaceae
- Genus: Elaeocarpus
- Species: E. miriensis

Binomial name
- Elaeocarpus miriensis Weibel

Species of flowering plant endemic to Borneo

Elaeocarpus miriensis is a species of flowering plant in the Elaeocarpaceae family. It is a tree endemic to Borneo.
