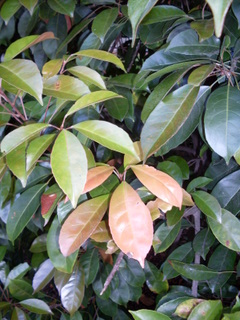
- Elaeocarpus eumundi – new growth

Scientific classification
- Kingdom: Plantae
- Clade: Tracheophytes
- Clade: Angiosperms
- Clade: Eudicots
- Clade: Rosids
- Order: Oxalidales
- Family: Elaeocarpaceae
- Genus: Elaeocarpus
- Species: E. eumundi

Binomial name
- Elaeocarpus eumundi F.M.Bailey

= Elaeocarpus eumundi =

Eumundi quandong

Species of flowering plant endemic to Australia

Elaeocarpus eumundi, commonly known as Eumundi quandong, or smooth-leaved quandong, is a species of flowering plant in the family Elaeocarpaceae and is endemic to north-eastern Australia. It is a mid-sized tree with egg-shaped to lance-shaped leaves, racemes of cream-coloured flowers and blue fruit. It grows in rainforest from the Cape York Peninsula in Queensland to north-eastern New South Wales.

== Description ==
Elaeocarpus eumundi is a tree that typically grows to a height of 12–25 m (39–82 ft) with fibrous bark, and sometimes has buttress roots at the base of the trunk. The leaves are mostly clustered near the end of the branchlets, elliptic to egg-shaped or lance-shaped with the narrower end towards the base, 60–130 mm (2.4–5.1 in) long and 20–40 mm (0.79–1.57 in) wide on a petiole 10–50 mm (0.39–1.97 in) long. The leaves sometimes have teeth on the edges, but mostly near the tip. The midvein on the upper surface is prominent and the leaves turn yellow rather than red, as they age. The flowers are borne in groups of up to eight on hairy pedicels 6–8 mm (0.24–0.31 in) long. The five sepals are narrow triangular, 9–9.5 mm (0.35–0.37 in) long and about 2 mm (0.079 in) wide. The five petals are cream-coloured, up to 11 mm (0.43 in) long and 4 mm (0.16 in) wide with the tip divided into between seventeen and twenty lobes 1–1.5 mm (0.039–0.059 in) long and there are twenty-four to thirty stamens. Flowering occurs from November to December and the fruit is a blue, oval drupe about 15 mm (0.59 in) long.

== Taxonomy ==
Elaeocarpus eumundi was first formally described in 1894 by Frederick Manson Bailey in Proceedings of the Royal Society of Queensland. Bailey noted that the specific epithet (eumundii) refers to the Eumundi district, because "as far as is present known, it would seem to be confined to that district".

== Distribution and habitat ==
This quandong is widely distributed in rainforest on Cape York Peninsula, north-eastern Queensland and central-eastern Queensland on a variety of sites at altitudes up to 1,000 m (3,300 ft). It is rare in New South Wales, occurring north from the Whian Whian State Conservation Area.

== Uses ==
=== Use in horticulture ===
Eumundi quandong is well suited as an ornamental tree and attract nectar-feeding and seed-eating birds.

=== Use as food ===
The fruit is said to be juicy and sharply acid.

== Gallery ==
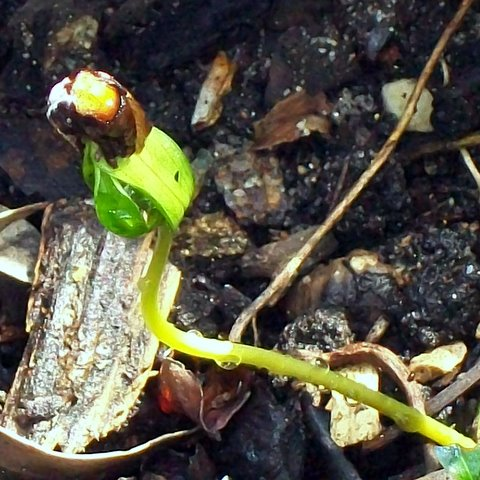
Seedling

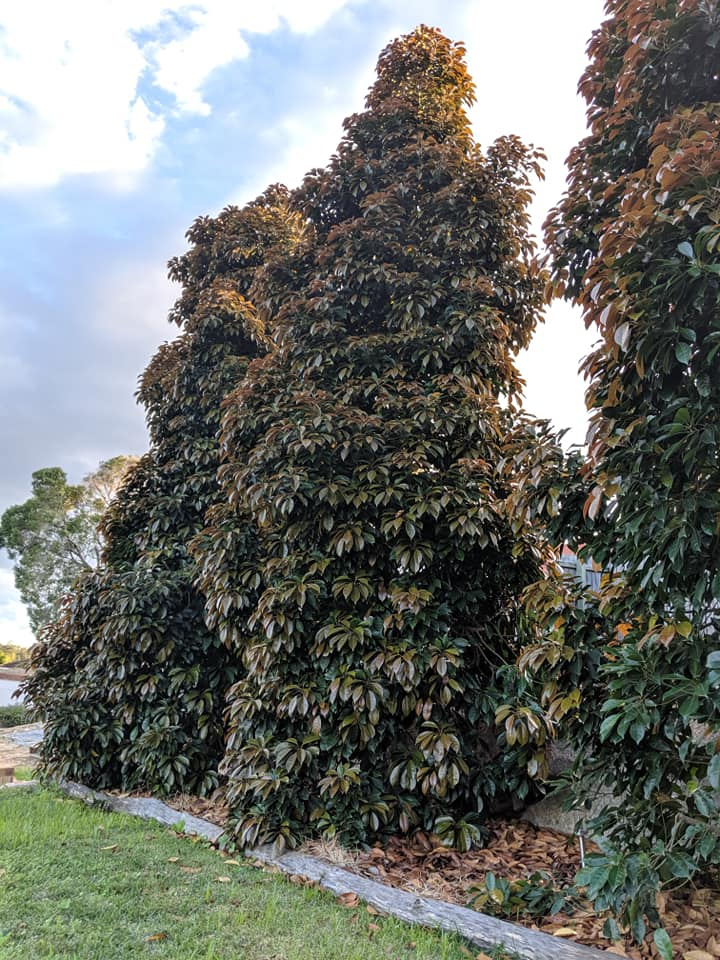
Flushes of bronze – red in new growth

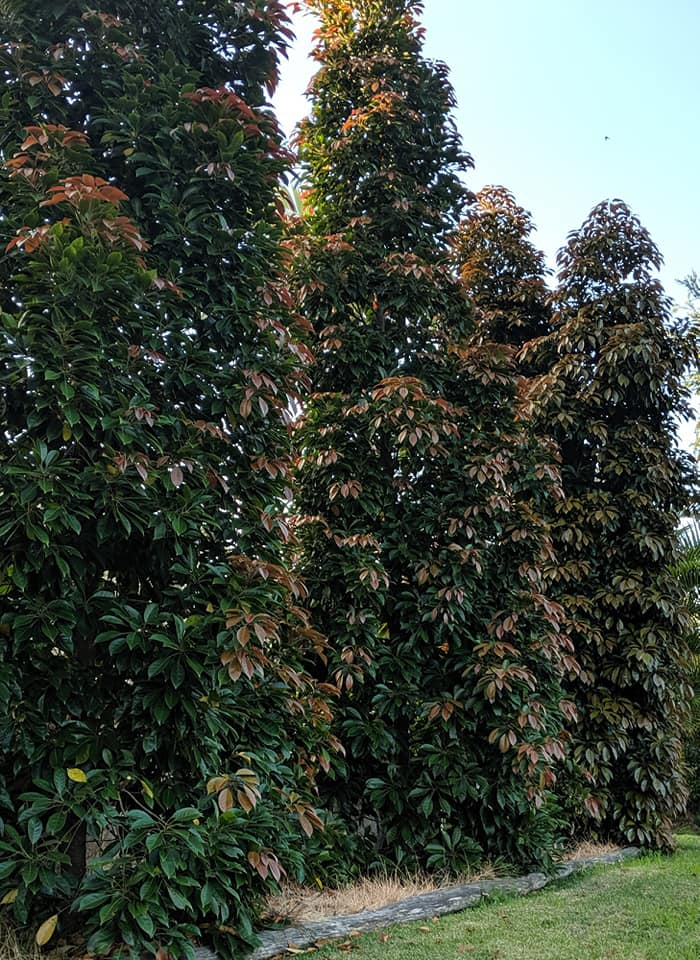
Leaves

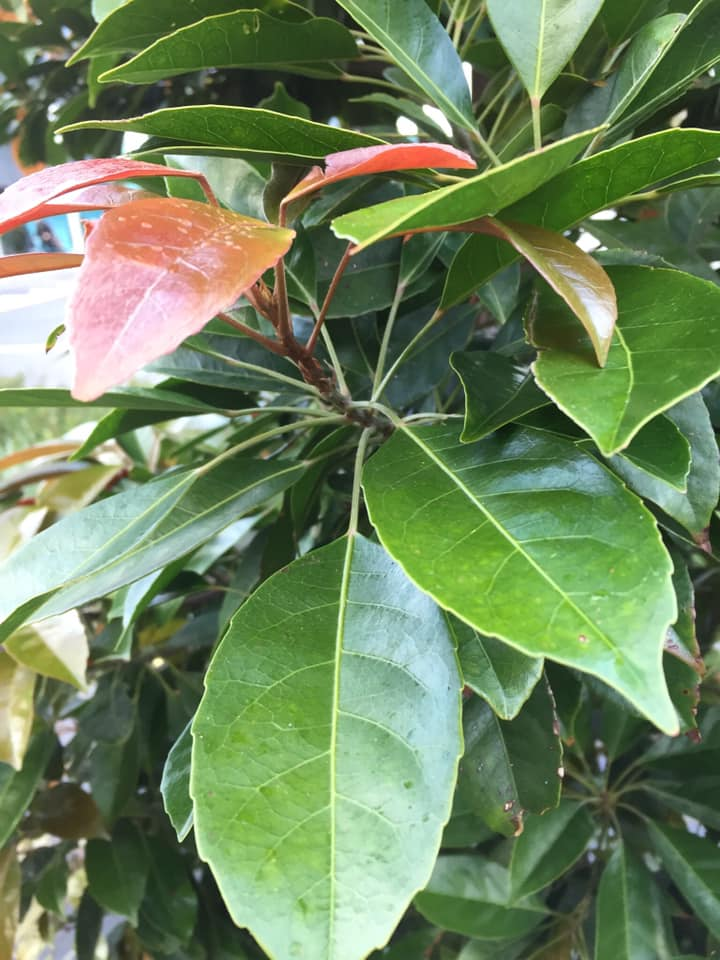
Leaves

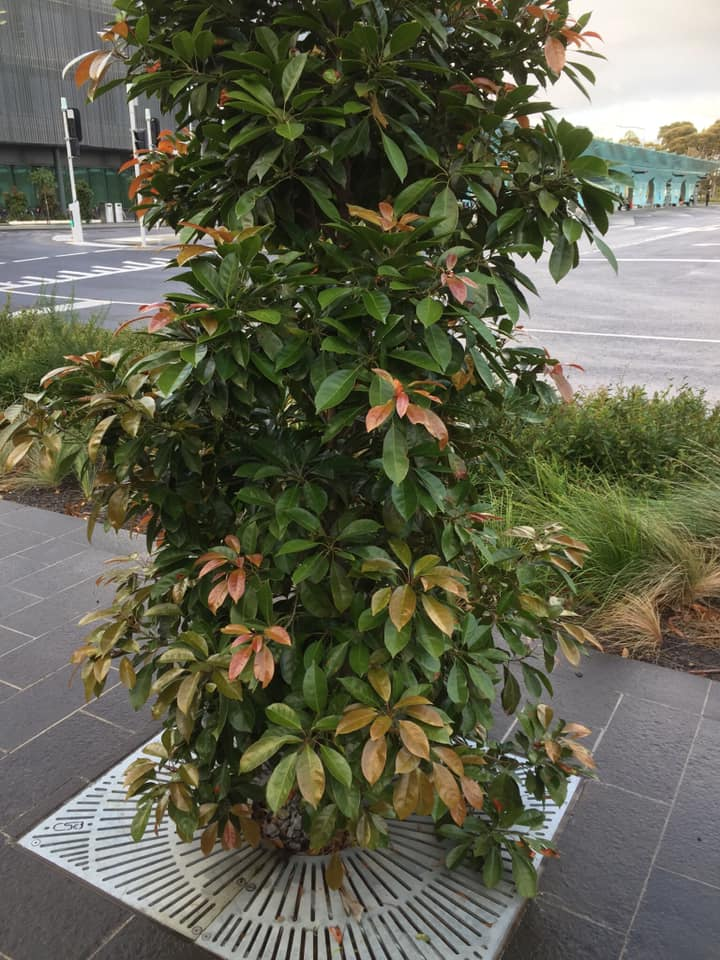
In a public space

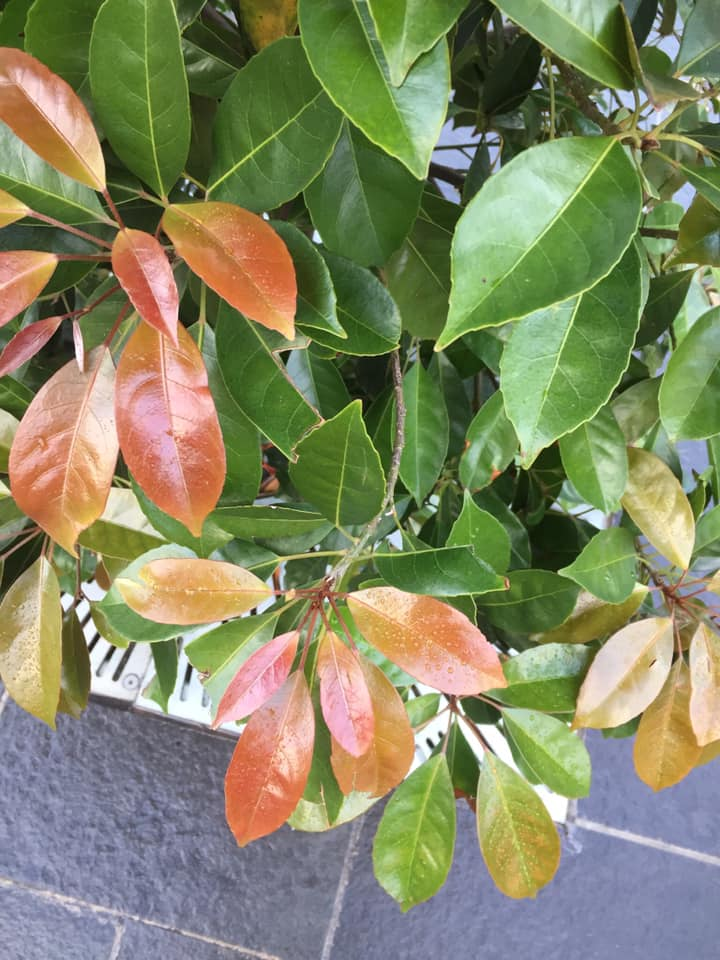
Foliage
