= Elaeocarpus royenii =

Conservation status
- Vulnerable (IUCN 2.3)

Scientific classification
- Kingdom: Plantae
- Clade: Tracheophytes
- Clade: Angiosperms
- Clade: Eudicots
- Clade: Rosids
- Order: Oxalidales
- Family: Elaeocarpaceae
- Genus: Elaeocarpus
- Species: E. royenii

Binomial name
- Elaeocarpus royenii Weibel

Species of flowering plant endemic to West Papua

Elaeocarpus royenii is a species of flowering plant in the Elaeocarpaceae family. It is found only in West Papua (Indonesia).
