= Elaeocarpus prunifolius =

Conservation status
- Vulnerable (IUCN 2.3)

Scientific classification
- Kingdom: Plantae
- Clade: Tracheophytes
- Clade: Angiosperms
- Clade: Eudicots
- Clade: Rosids
- Order: Oxalidales
- Family: Elaeocarpaceae
- Genus: Elaeocarpus
- Species: E. prunifolius

Binomial name
- Elaeocarpus prunifolius Wallich

Species of flowering plant

Elaeocarpus prunifolius is a species of flowering plant in the Elaeocarpaceae family. It is found in Bangladesh and India. It is threatened by habitat loss.

== Distribution and habitat ==
E. prunifolius is the only Elaeocarpus species found in Northeast India. In 2025 new population of the plant was found in community-managed forests of the Jaintia and Khasi Hills by botanist Viheno Iralu and her team.

== Cultural use ==
The Khasi people call it Soh-khyllameitblang (soh means fruit). The Pnar people people call it dieng-ruin or dieng-lakhmar.
