= Elaeocarpus subvillosus =

Conservation status
- Vulnerable (IUCN 2.3)

Scientific classification
- Kingdom: Plantae
- Clade: Tracheophytes
- Clade: Angiosperms
- Clade: Eudicots
- Clade: Rosids
- Order: Oxalidales
- Family: Elaeocarpaceae
- Genus: Elaeocarpus
- Species: E. subvillosus

Binomial name
- Elaeocarpus subvillosus Arn.

Species of flowering plant endemic to Sri Lanka

Elaeocarpus subvillosus is a species of flowering plant in the Elaeocarpaceae family. It is found only in Sri Lanka.
