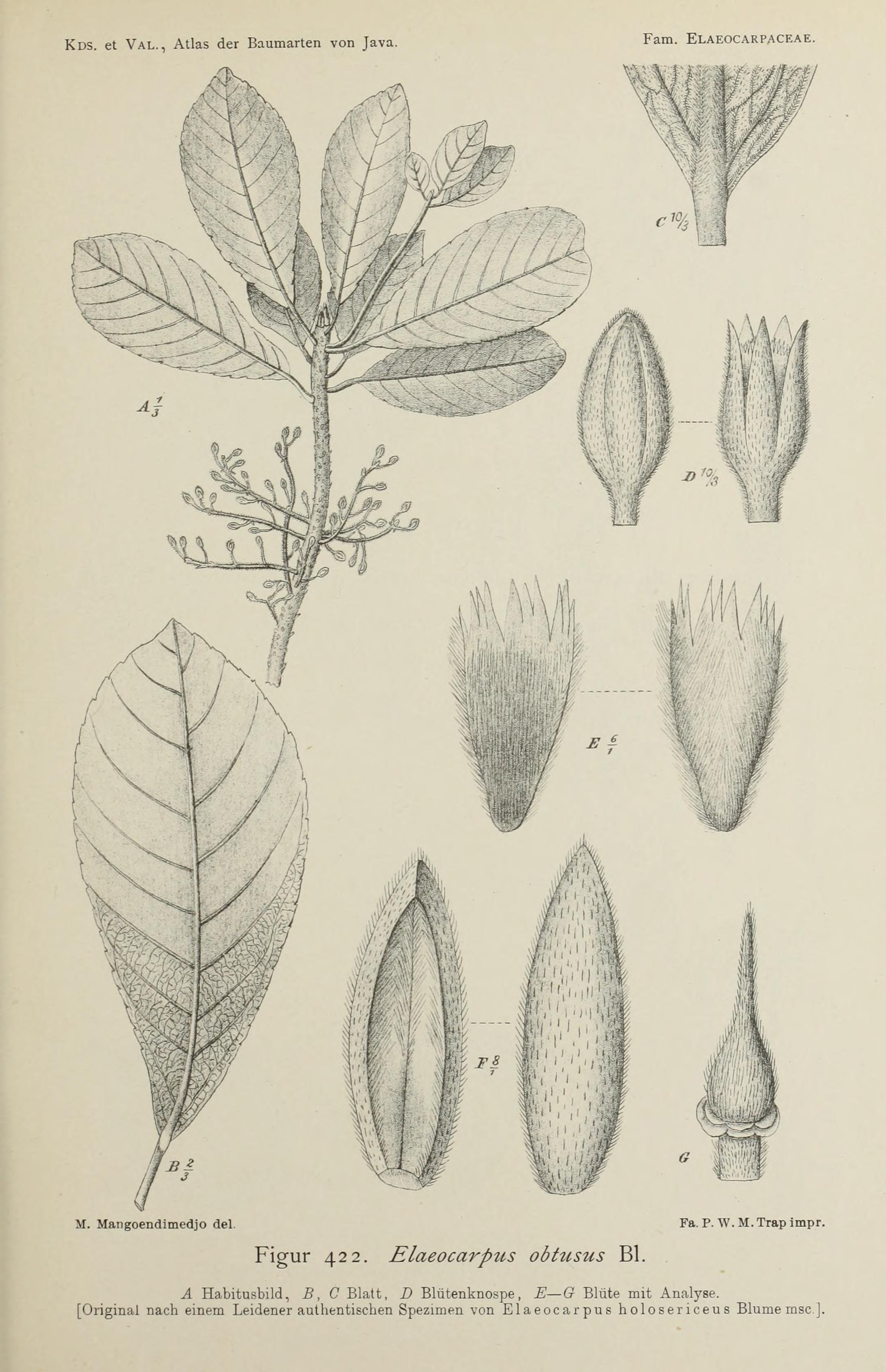
- Botanical illustration

Conservation status
- Least Concern (IUCN 3.1)

Scientific classification
- Kingdom: Plantae
- Clade: Embryophytes
- Clade: Tracheophytes
- Clade: Spermatophytes
- Clade: Angiosperms
- Clade: Eudicots
- Clade: Rosids
- Order: Oxalidales
- Family: Elaeocarpaceae
- Genus: Elaeocarpus
- Species: E. obtusus

Binomial name
- Elaeocarpus obtusus Blume

Synonyms
- Elaeocarpus holosericeus Blume ex Koord. & Valeton; Monocera (Blume) Hassk.; Monocera robusta Miq.

= Elaeocarpus obtusus =

Species of flowering plant native to Asia

Elaeocarpus obtusus is a species of flowering plant in the Elaeocarpaceae family. It is native to Southeast Asia.
