= Elaeocarpus rugosus =

Conservation status
- Vulnerable (IUCN 2.3)

Scientific classification
- Kingdom: Plantae
- Clade: Tracheophytes
- Clade: Angiosperms
- Clade: Eudicots
- Clade: Rosids
- Order: Oxalidales
- Family: Elaeocarpaceae
- Genus: Elaeocarpus
- Species: E. rugosus

Binomial name
- Elaeocarpus rugosus Roxb.

Species of flowering plant

Elaeocarpus rugosus is a species of flowering plant in the Elaeocarpaceae family. It a tree is found in Peninsular Malaysia and Singapore. It is threatened by habitat loss.
