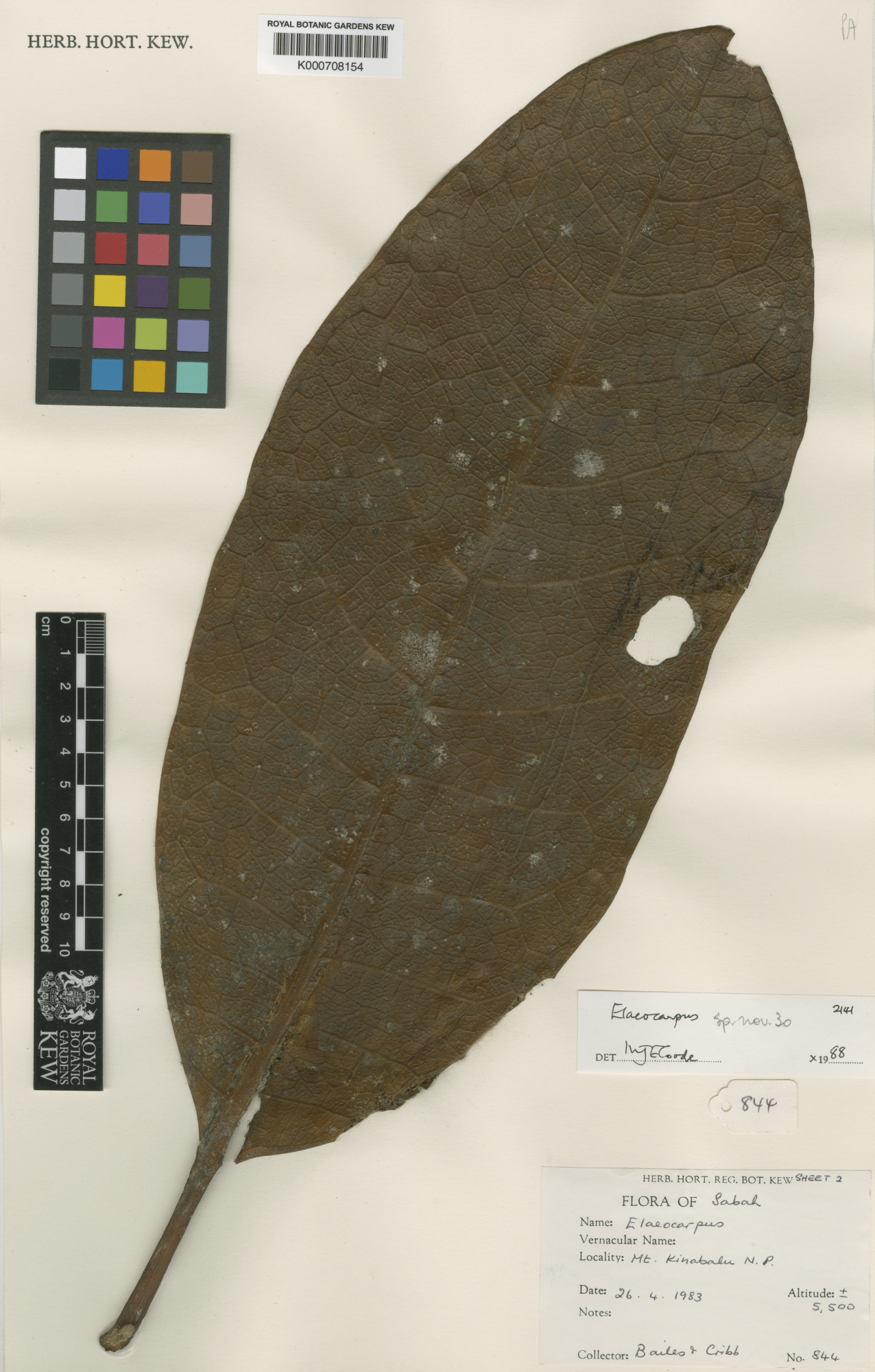

Conservation status
- Vulnerable (IUCN 3.1)

Scientific classification
- Kingdom: Plantae
- Clade: Tracheophytes
- Clade: Angiosperms
- Clade: Eudicots
- Clade: Rosids
- Order: Oxalidales
- Family: Elaeocarpaceae
- Genus: Elaeocarpus
- Species: E. inopinatus

Binomial name
- Elaeocarpus inopinatus Coode

= Elaeocarpus inopinatus =

Species of flowering plant endemic to Borneo

Elaeocarpus inopinatus is a species of flowering plant in the Elaeocarpaceae family. It is a tree endemic to Borneo where it is confined to Sabah.

== Description ==
Eleaeocarpus inopinatus is a small tree, growing up to 12 meters (39 ft) tall.

== Range and habitat ==
Elaeocarpus inopinatus is known only from Marai Parai, a plateau on the northwestern side of Mount Kinabalu. It grows in scrubby forest over ultramafic rock between 1,500 and 1,700 meters (4,900 and 5,600 ft) elevation. The species' estimated area of occupancy (AOO) and extent of occurrence (EOO) are both 4 km^{2} (1.5 sq mi).

The species' habitat is protected in Kinabalu Park, and its habitat and population are not declining. Its limited range makes the species vulnerable to hazards like fire, drought, and landslide.
