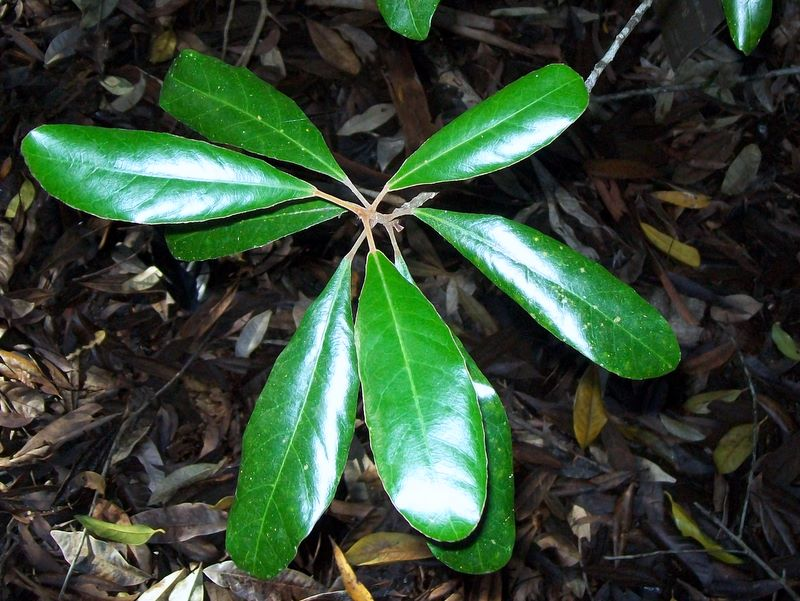

Conservation status
- Endangered (EPBC Act)

Scientific classification
- Kingdom: Plantae
- Clade: Tracheophytes
- Clade: Angiosperms
- Clade: Eudicots
- Clade: Rosids
- Order: Oxalidales
- Family: Elaeocarpaceae
- Genus: Elaeocarpus
- Species: E. williamsianus

Binomial name
- Elaeocarpus williamsianus Guymer

= Elaeocarpus williamsianus =

Hairy quandong

Species of flowering plant endemic to Australia

Elaeocarpus williamsianus, commonly known as hairy quandong, is a species of flowering plant in the family Elaeocarpaceae. It is endemic to a restricted area of north-eastern New South Wales, Australia. It is a small tree with lance-shaped leaves, racemes of greenish-white flowers and spherical blue fruit.

== Description ==
Elaeocarpus williamsianus is a tree that typically grows to a height of 9–15 m (30–49 ft) with a trunk diameter of up to 18 cm (7.1 in), with creamy-brown bark but without buttress roots. Its young branchlets are densely covered with woolly, rust-coloured hairs. The leaves are lance-shaped to egg-shaped with the narrower end towards the base, 90–150 mm (3.5–5.9 in) long and 30–55 mm (1.2–2.2 in) wide on a petiole 15–32 mm (0.59–1.26 in) long. The leaves sometimes have eight to ten pairs of inconspicuous teeth on the edges. The flowers are pendent, borne in leaf axils in groups of eleven to sixteen on a rachis 25–50 mm (0.98–1.97 in) long, each flower on a pedicel 2–4 mm (0.079–0.157 in) long. The flowers have five oblong to narrow triangular green sepals 9.5–11 mm (0.37–0.43 in) long and about 2 mm (0.079 in) wide. The five petals are greenish-white, oblong, 11–13 mm (0.43–0.51 in) long and 2–2.5 mm (0.079–0.098 in) wide with a fringe of twenty-two to twenty-six linear lobes at the tip. There are thirty to thirty-eight stamens and the ovary is covered with silvery hairs. Flowering occurs from November to December and the fruit is a more or less spherical blue drupe about 20–30 mm (0.79–1.18 in) in diameter, the stone with three longitudinal grooves.

== Taxonomy ==
Elaeocarpus williamsianus was first formally described in 1983 by Gordon Paul Guymer in the journal Telopea from specimens collected near Burringbar in 1980. The specific epithet (williamsianus) honours John Beaumont Williams of the University of New England.

== Distribution and habitat ==
Hairy quandong is restricted to nine sites on the Burringbar Range in the far north-east of New South Wales, where it grows in warm temperate rainforest, including in disturbed areas where it has regrown from root suckers.

== Conservation status ==
This quandong is very rare and at least six of the nine populations are clones and produce few seeds. The species is listed as "endangered" under the Australian Government Environment Protection and Biodiversity Conservation Act 1999 and the New South Wales Government Biodiversity Conservation Act 2016. A recovery plan has been prepared. The main threats to the species include habitat clearing and fragmentation, weed invasion, and the species limited genetic diversity.
