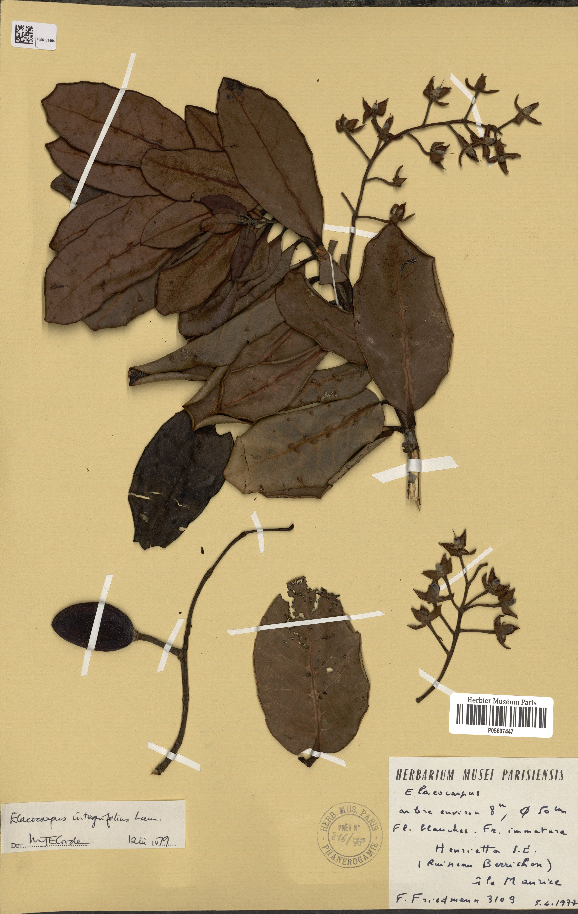

Conservation status
- Critically Endangered (IUCN 2.3)

Scientific classification
- Kingdom: Plantae
- Clade: Tracheophytes
- Clade: Angiosperms
- Clade: Eudicots
- Clade: Rosids
- Order: Oxalidales
- Family: Elaeocarpaceae
- Genus: Elaeocarpus
- Species: E. integrifolius

Binomial name
- Elaeocarpus integrifolius Lam.

= Elaeocarpus integrifolius =

Species of flowering plant endemic to Mauritius

Elaeocarpus integrifolius is a species of flowering plant in the Elaeocarpaceae family. It is found only in Mauritius. Its natural habitat is subtropical or tropical dry forests.
