= Elaeocarpus montanus =

Scientific classification
- Kingdom: Plantae
- Clade: Tracheophytes
- Clade: Angiosperms
- Clade: Eudicots
- Clade: Rosids
- Order: Oxalidales
- Family: Elaeocarpaceae
- Genus: Elaeocarpus
- Species: E. montanus

Binomial name
- Elaeocarpus montanus Thwaites

Species of flowering plant endemic to Sri Lanka

Elaeocarpus montanus is a species of flowering plant in the Elaeocarpaceae family used as a medicinal plant. It is endemic to Sri Lanka. It is known as Gal weralu (ගල් වෙරලු) by Sinhalese people.
