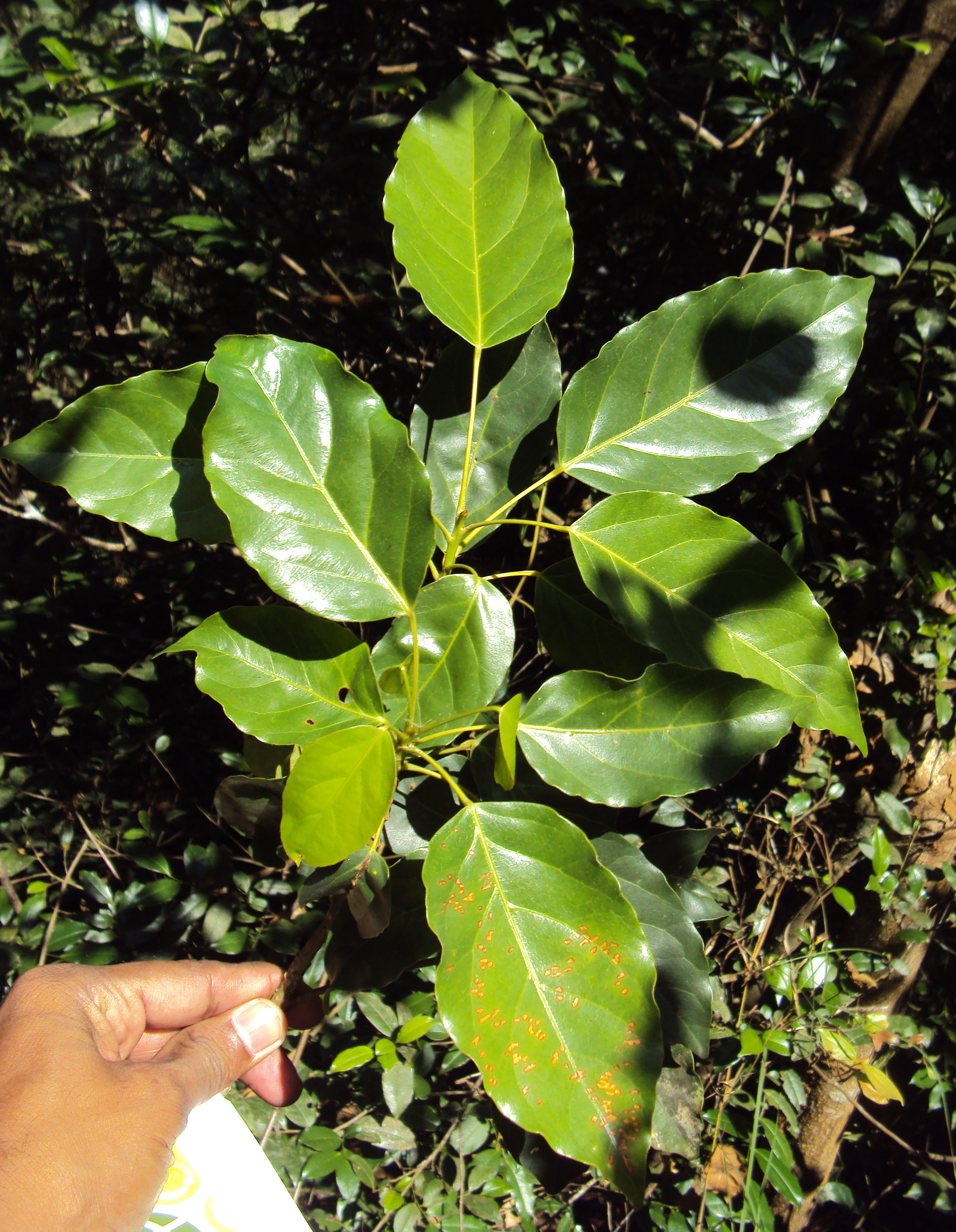
- Leaves

Conservation status
- Near Threatened (IUCN 2.3)

Scientific classification
- Kingdom: Plantae
- Clade: Tracheophytes
- Clade: Angiosperms
- Clade: Eudicots
- Clade: Rosids
- Order: Oxalidales
- Family: Elaeocarpaceae
- Genus: Elaeocarpus
- Species: E. munroi

Binomial name
- Elaeocarpus munroi (Wight) Mast. (1874)

Synonyms
- Monocera munroii Wight (1838)

= Elaeocarpus munroi =

Species of flowering plant endemic to India

Elaeocarpus munroi is a species of flowering plant in the Elaeocarpaceae family. It is endemic to the Western Ghats of southern India, in the states of Tamil Nadu, Maharashtra, and Karnataka. It grows in montane evergreen rain forest and shola forest from 600 to 2,000 metres (2,000 to 6,600 ft) elevation.

It was first formally described in 1838 by Robert Wight, who gave it the name Monocera munroii in his book Illustrations of Indian Botany. In 1874, Maxwell T. Masters changed the name to Elaeocarpus munroi in the Hooker's Flora of British India. The specific epithet (munroi) honours the botanist, William Munro.
