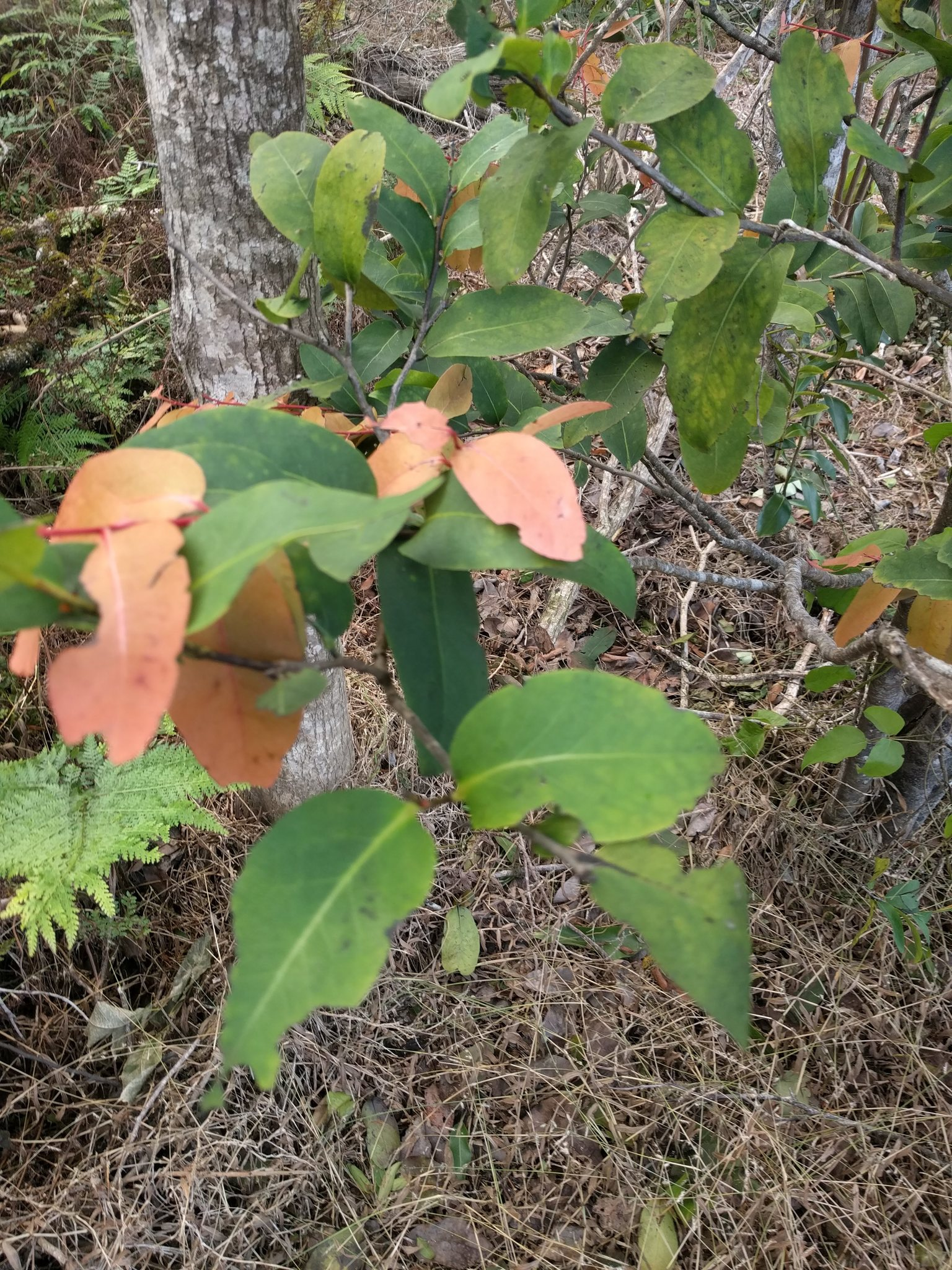

Conservation status
- Endangered (IUCN 3.1)

Scientific classification
- Kingdom: Plantae
- Clade: Tracheophytes
- Clade: Angiosperms
- Clade: Eudicots
- Clade: Asterids
- Order: Ericales
- Family: Ebenaceae
- Genus: Diospyros
- Species: D. hillebrandii

Binomial name
- Diospyros hillebrandii (Seem.) Fosberg

Synonyms
- Maba hillebrandii Seem. Ebenus hillebrandii (Seem.) Kuntze; Diospyros ferrea var. hillebrandii (Seem.) Bakh.f.

= Diospyros hillebrandii =

Species of tree

Diospyros hillebrandii is a species of flowering tree in the ebony family, Ebenaceae, that is endemic to the islands of Oʻahu and Kauaʻi in Hawaii. Its common name, Ēlama, also means torch or lamp in Hawaiian. Ēlama is a small to medium-sized tree, reaching a height of 4–10 m (13–33 ft). It can be found in coastal mesic and mixed mesic forests at elevations of 150–760 m (490–2,490 ft).
