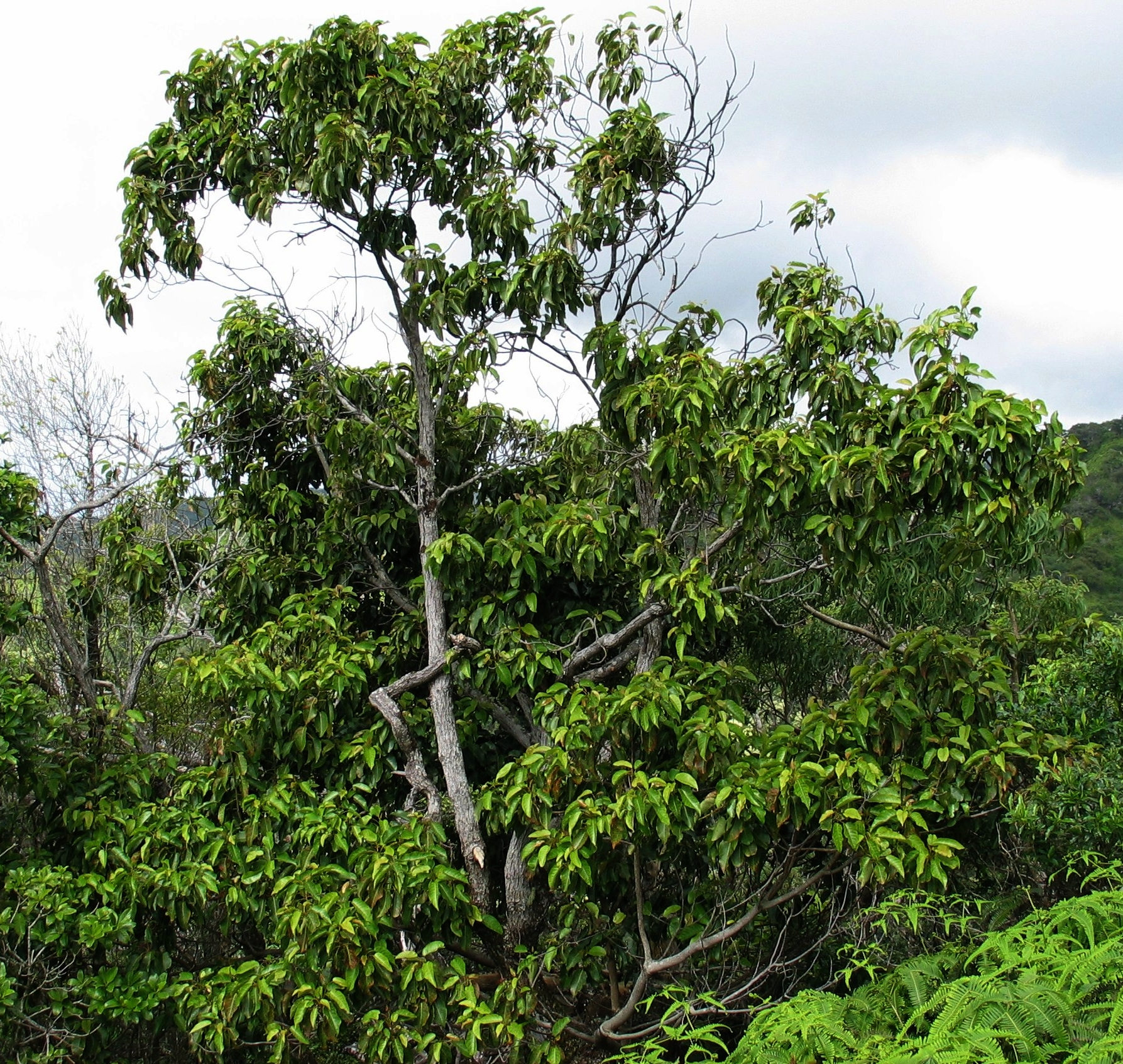
- Kalia on Kalauao trail, Oʻahu

Scientific classification
- Kingdom: Plantae
- Clade: Tracheophytes
- Clade: Angiosperms
- Clade: Eudicots
- Clade: Rosids
- Order: Oxalidales
- Family: Elaeocarpaceae
- Genus: Elaeocarpus
- Species: E. bifidus

Binomial name
- Elaeocarpus bifidus Hook. & Arn., 1832.

= Elaeocarpus bifidus =

Species of flowering plant

Elaeocarpus bifidus, known in Hawaiian as kalia, is a species of flowering plant in the family Elaeocarpaceae that is endemic to the islands of Kauaʻi and Oʻahu in Hawaiʻi

The kalia is a medium-sized evergreen tree, and has fruits that resemble olives. Formerly the bark was used to make rope, and the branches were used in the construction of thatched roofs.

== Description ==
The texture of the leaves is similar to paper, and they are alternate. They are elongated at about 4–10 cm (1.6–3.9 in) long. The bottom of the leaf is covered in fine hairs. Blades are ovate to lancelote. They are 7.5–15 cm (3.0–5.9 in) long and 4–10 cm (1.6–3.9 in) wide. It has wavy-toothed edges. The tree bears bell-shaped flower clusters that are 3–8 cm (1.2–3.1 in) long and have a pale, greenish-yellow shade.

== Habitat and distribution ==
Elaeocarpus bifidus is commonly found in wet forests at altitudes from 90 to 1,220 m (300 to 4,000 ft). It is native to the islands of Kaua’i and O’ahu.

== Human use ==
This species can be used to make rope with the fiber from the bark. Slender branches can be useful for thatching roofs, and rafters can be constructed from larger branches. In ancient Hawaiian usage, black and blue dye was made from this species.

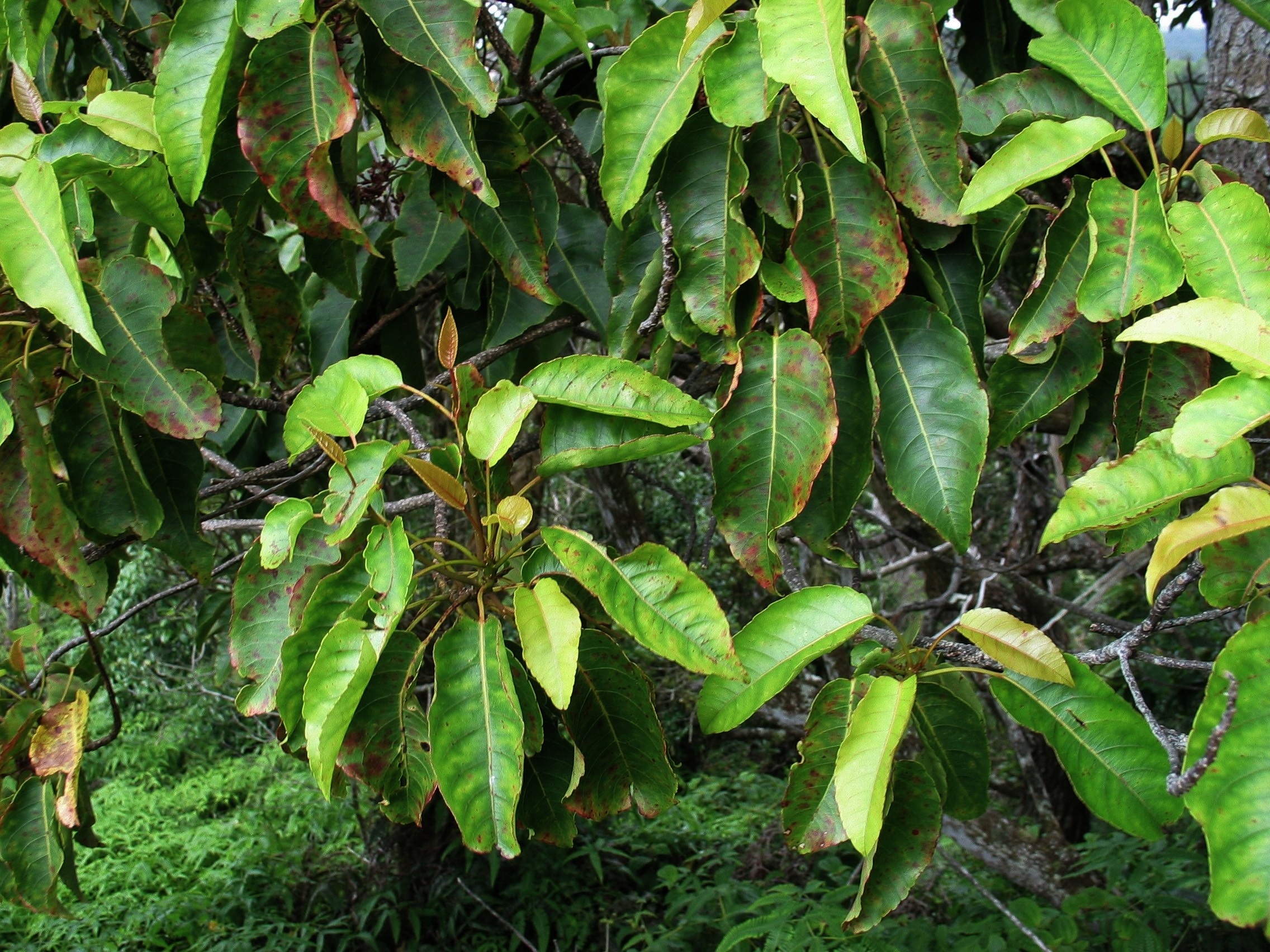
