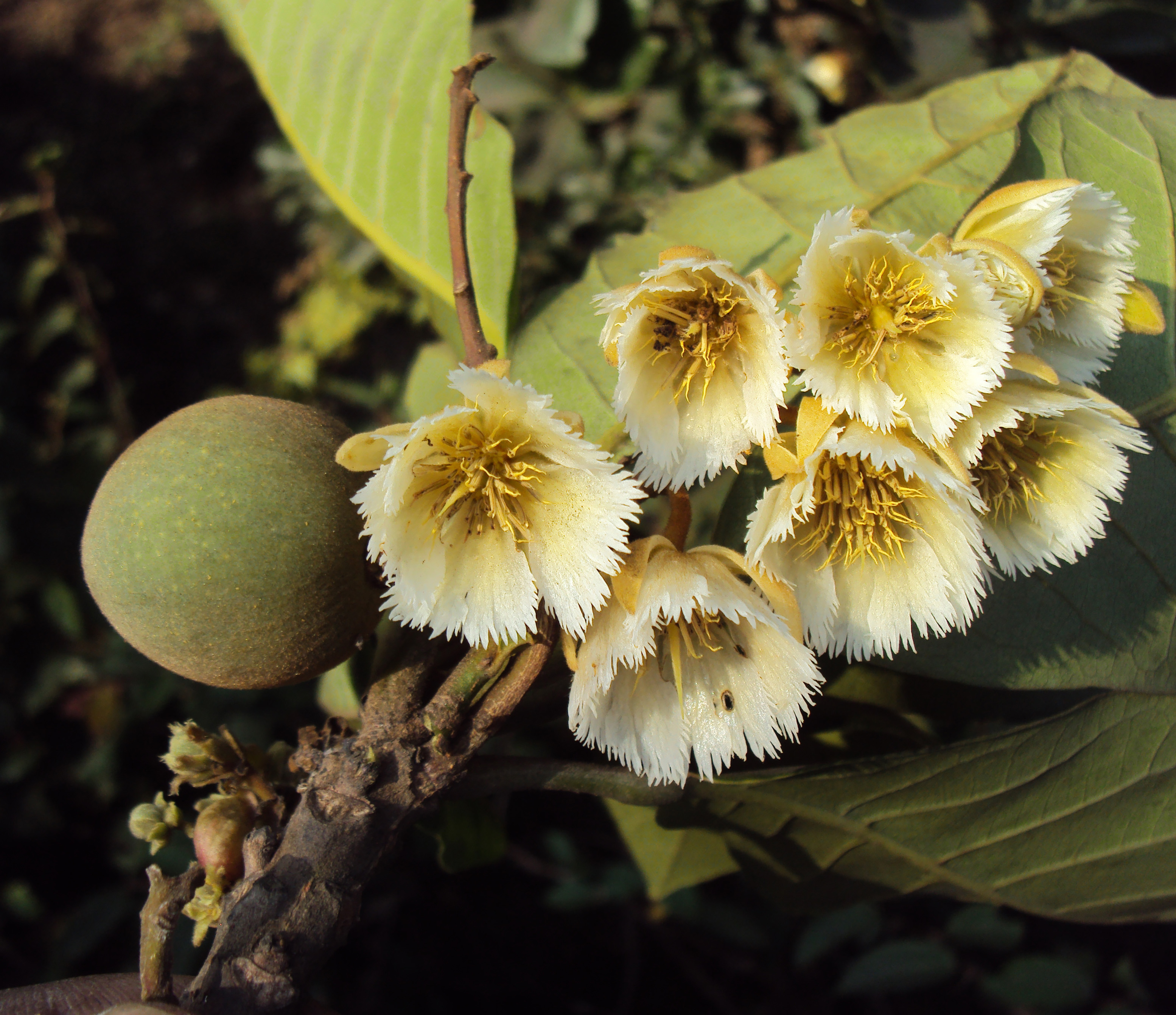

Scientific classification
- Kingdom: Plantae
- Clade: Tracheophytes
- Clade: Angiosperms
- Clade: Eudicots
- Clade: Rosids
- Order: Oxalidales
- Family: Elaeocarpaceae
- Genus: Elaeocarpus
- Species: E. tuberculatus

Binomial name
- Elaeocarpus tuberculatus Roxb.

Synonyms
- Monocera tuberculata (Roxb.) Wight & Arn

= Elaeocarpus tuberculatus =

Species of flowering plant

Elaeocarpus tuberculatus, the warty marble tree, is a species of flowering plant in the family Elaeocarpaceae and is native to Andaman Island, Bangladesh, India, Java, and Myanmar.

== Description ==
It is a tall tree with buttresses. The bark is smooth and mottled in shades of grey and white. Leaves are simple, alternate, and spirally arranged, clustered near the ends of twigs. Flowers are white in axillary racemes. The fruit is a drupe, elliptic-oblong, up to 5 × 3 cm in size. Seeds are solitary, compressed, and deeply tuberculate.
