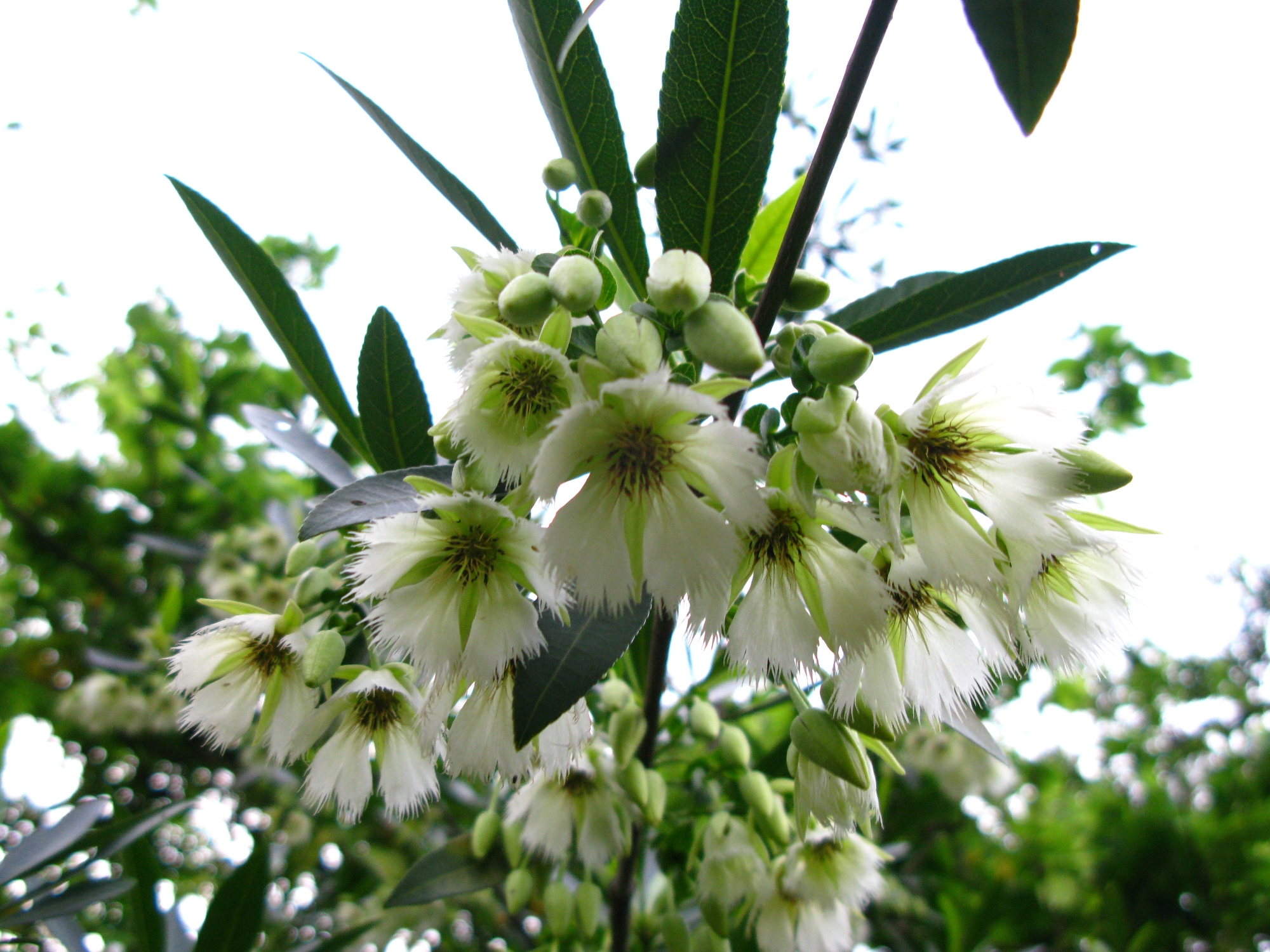
- Elaeocarpus hainanensis flowers

Scientific classification
- Kingdom: Plantae
- Clade: Tracheophytes
- Clade: Angiosperms
- Clade: Eudicots
- Clade: Rosids
- Order: Oxalidales
- Family: Elaeocarpaceae
- Genus: Elaeocarpus; L.

Type species
- Elaeocarpus serratus L.f.

Species
- See List of Elaeocarpus species

= Elaeocarpus =

Genus of flowering plants

Elaeocarpus is a genus of nearly five hundred species of flowering plants in the family Elaeocarpaceae. The species are native to the western Indian Ocean, tropical and subtropical Asia, Australia and the Pacific. Plants in the genus are trees or shrubs with simple leaves, flowers with four or five petals, and usually blue fruit.

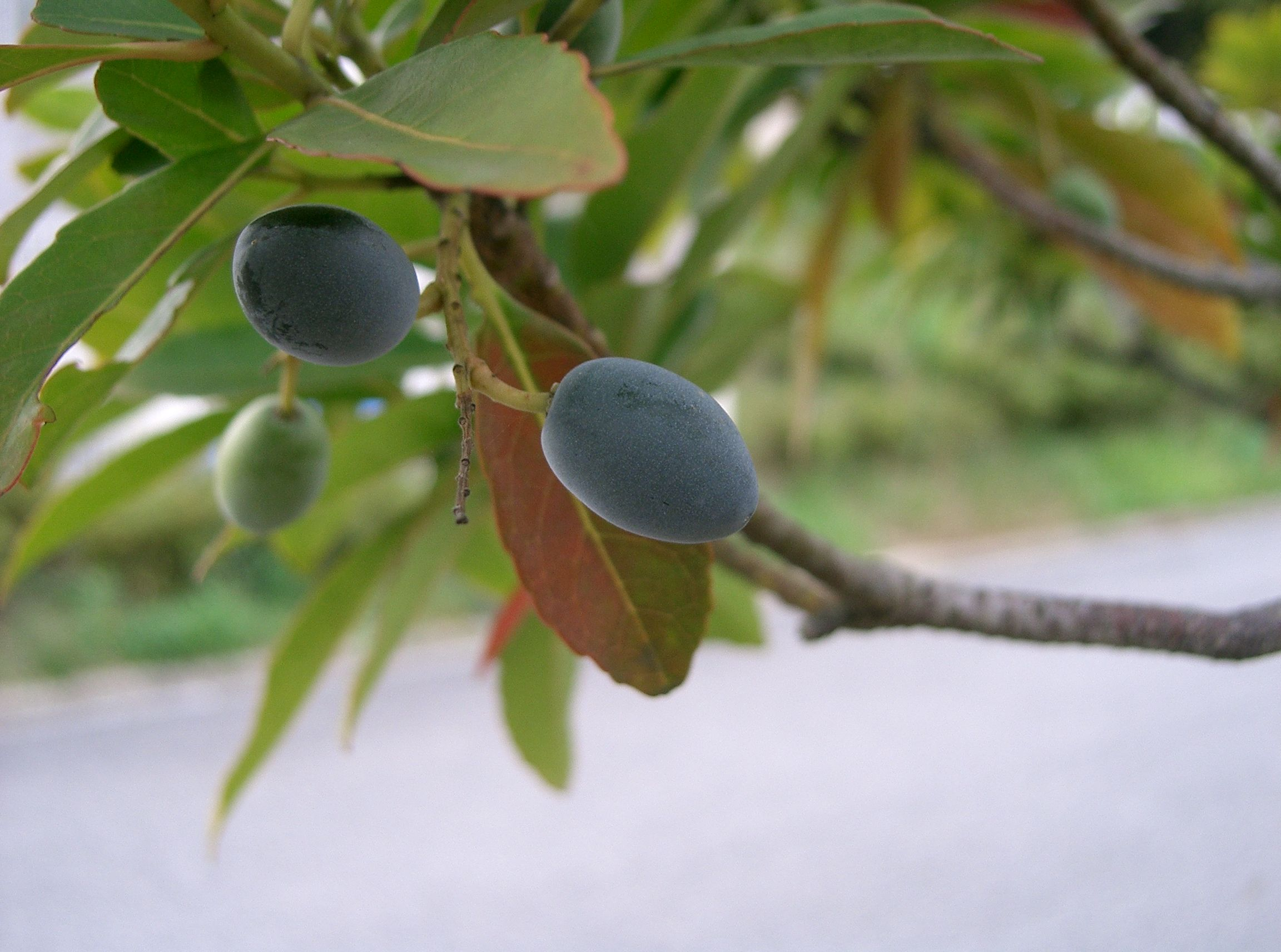
Elaeocarpus sylvestris fruits

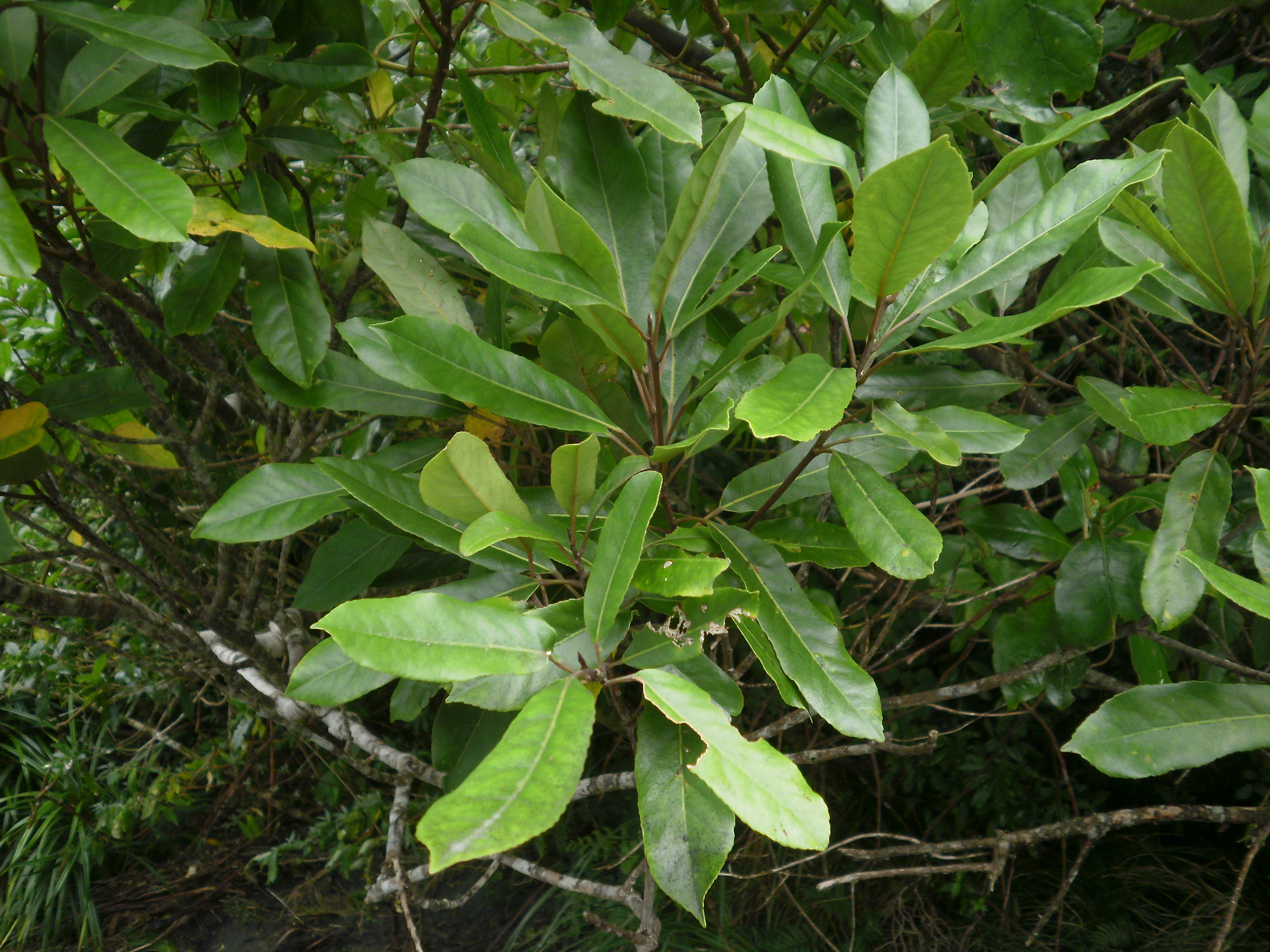
Elaeocarpus dentatus foliage

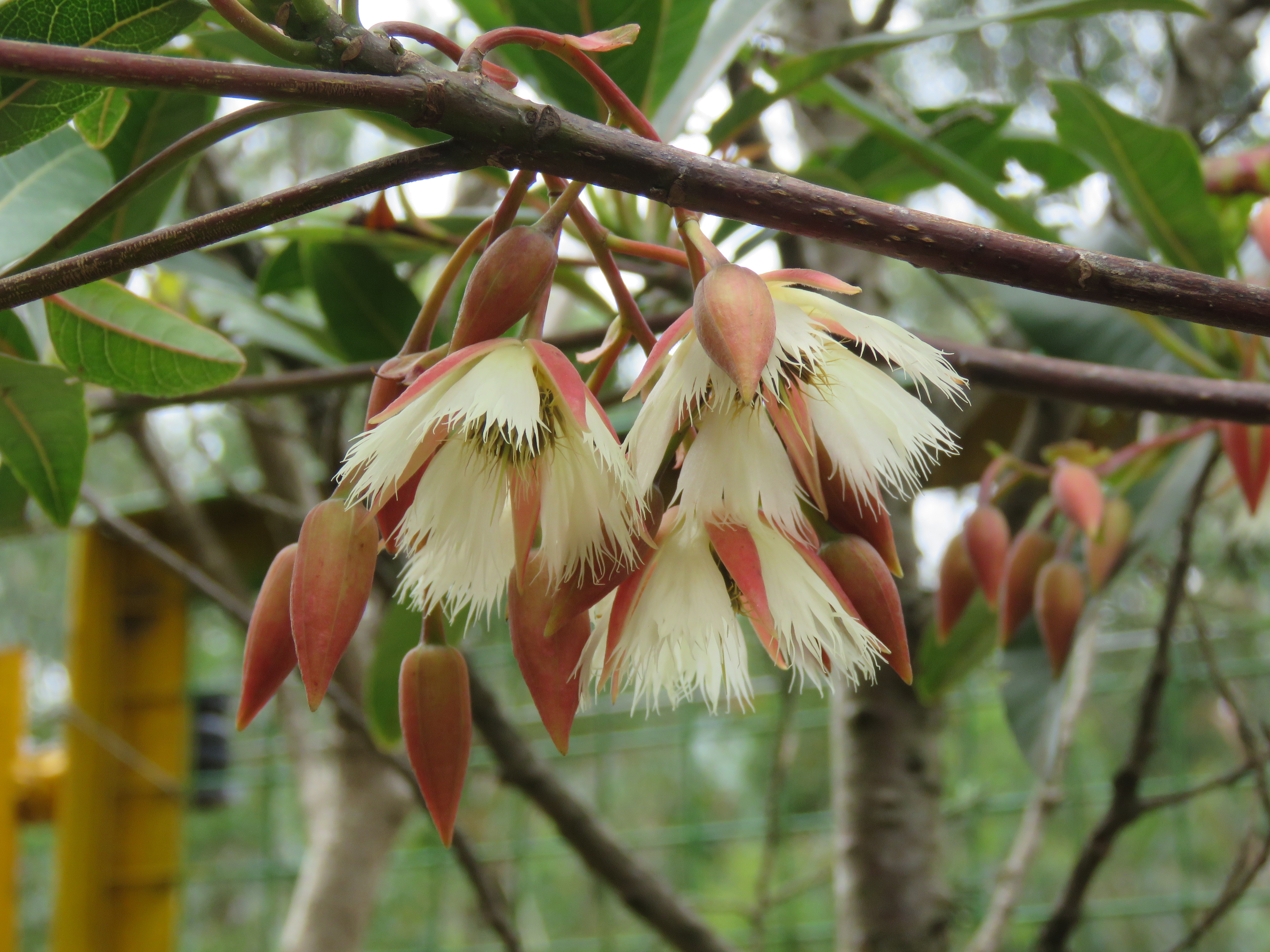
Elaeocarpus grandiflorus flowers, at Munnar

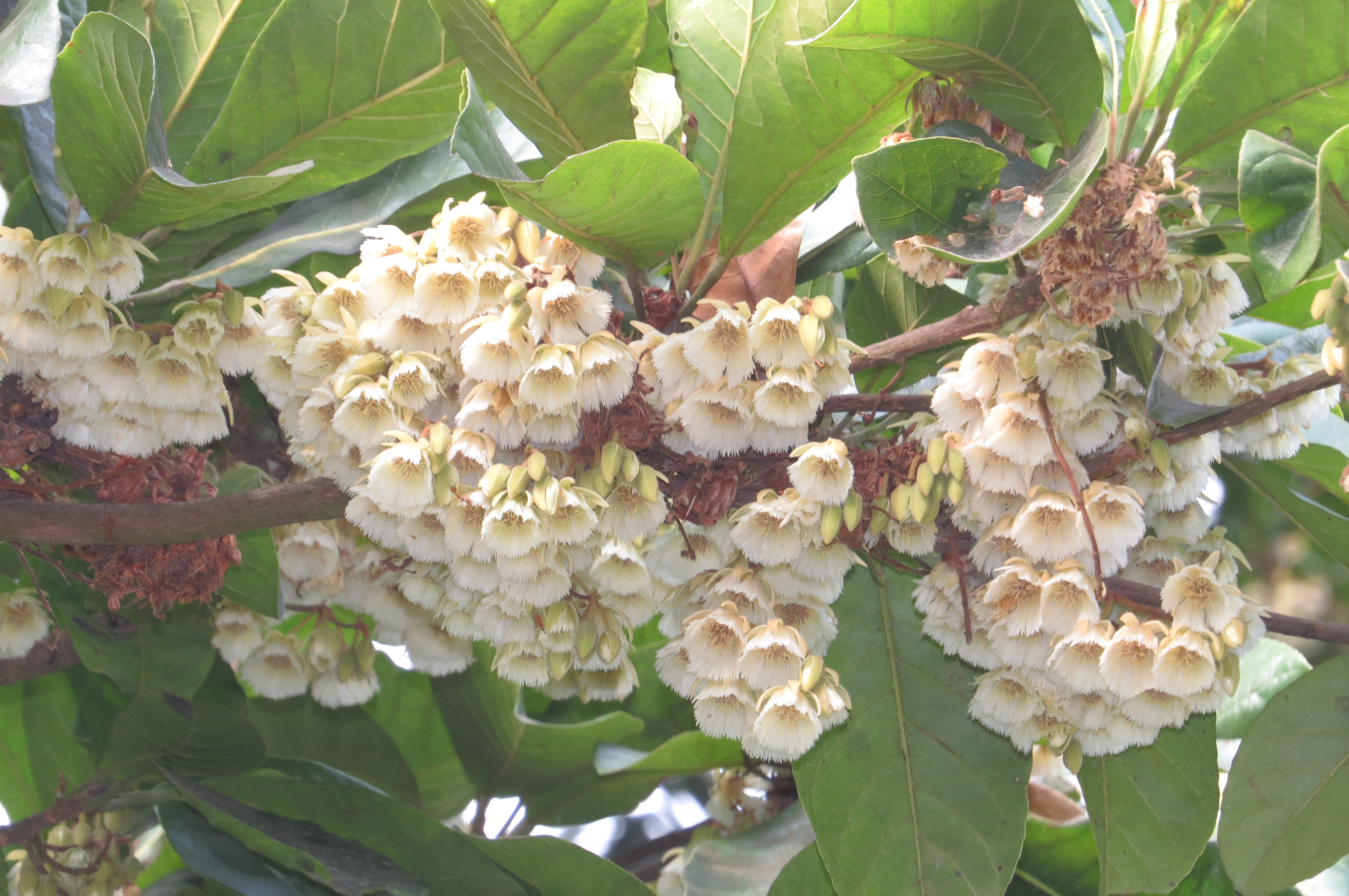
Elaeocarpus tuberculatus

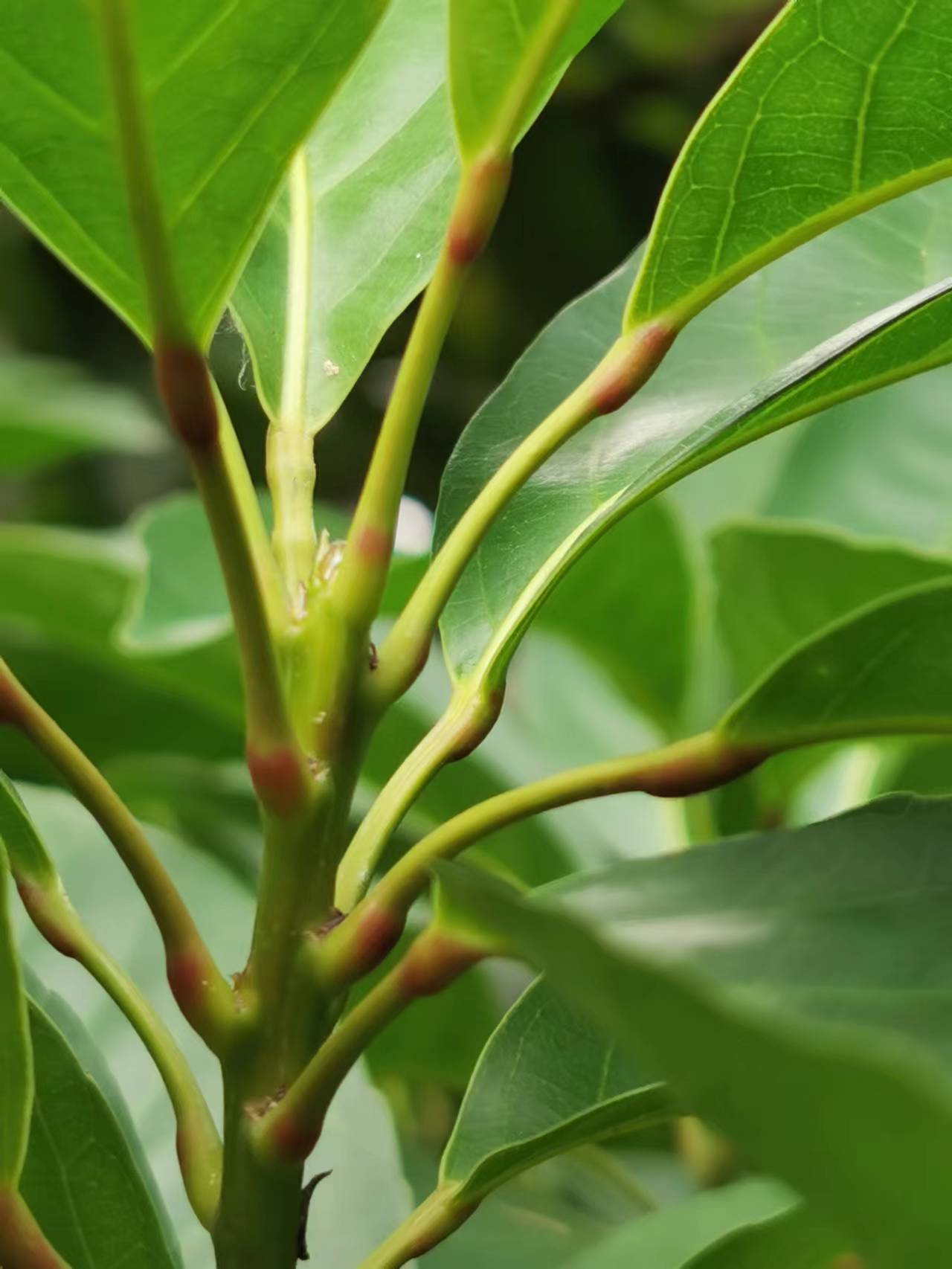
Pulvina at both ends of the petiole. Elaeocarpus multiflorus

== Description ==
Plants in the genus Elaeocarpus are mostly evergreen trees or shrubs, a few are epiphytes or lianes, and some are briefly deciduous. The leaves are arranged alternately, simple (strictly compound with only one leaflet) with a swelling where the petiole meets the leaf, often have toothed edges, usually have prominent veins and often turn red before falling. The flowers are usually arranged in a raceme, usually bisexual, have four or five sepals and petals and many stamens. The petals usually have finely-divided, linear lobes. The fruit is an oval to spherical drupe that is usually blue, sometimes black, with a sculptured endocarp.

== Taxonomy and naming ==
The genus Elaeocarpus was first formally described in 1753 by Carl Linnaeus in Species Plantarum, although Johannes Burman published an illustration of "Elaecarpus serrata" in his book Thesaurus zeylanicus, but without a description of the genus. The first species described by Linnaeus (the type species) was Elaeocarpus serratus. The name Elaeocarpus is derived from Greek and means ‘olive-fruited’.

== Species ==
See also List of Elaeocarpus species

There are about 480 species of Elaeocarpus, found on the islands of the western Indian Ocean, in tropical and subtropical Asia, Australia and on Pacific islands.

=== Selected species ===
- Elaeocarpus acmosepalus Stapf ex Ridl. – (Peninsular Malaysia, Singapore)
- Elaeocarpus amoenus Thwaites - (Sri Lanka)
- Elaeocarpus angustifolius Blume - (India, Bangladesh, China, Indochina, Indonesia, Australia, Papua New Guinea and surrounding islands)
- Elaeocarpus arnhemicus F.Muell. - (Northern Australia, New Guinea, Wallacea)
- Elaeocarpus bancroftii F.Muell. & F.M.Bailey - (Queensland)
- Elaeocarpus bifidus Hook. & Arn. - Hawaiian Islands (Kauaʻi & Oʻahu)
- Elaeocarpus blascoi Weibel - (India, threatened)
- Elaeocarpus bojeri R.E.Vaughan - (Mauritius)
- Elaeocarpus brigittae Coode - (Sumatra)
- Elaeocarpus calomala (Blanco) Merr. - (Philippines)
- Elaeocarpus carolinae B.Hyland & Coode - (north-east Queensland)
- Elaeocarpus ceylanicus (Arn.) Mast. - (Sri Lanka)
- Elaeocarpus colnettianus Guillaumin - (New Caledonia)
- Elaeocarpus cordifolius Coode - (Kalimantan, Sarawak)
- Elaeocarpus coriaceus Hook. - (Sri Lanka)
- Elaeocarpus costatus M.Taylor - (Lord Howe Island)
- Elaeocarpus cruciatus Corner - (Malaysia, threatened)
- Elaeocarpus culminicola Warb. - (Philippines, Malesia, Papuasia, Australia)
- Elaeocarpus dentatus (J.R.Forst. & G.Forst.) Vahl - (New Zealand)
- Elaeocarpus dinagatensis Merr. - (Philippines)
- Elaeocarpus eriobotryoides Ridl. - (Malaysia)
- Elaeocarpus eumundi F.M.Bailey - (Australia)
- Elaeocarpus ferrugineus (Jack) Steud. - (Peninsular Malaysia)
- Elaeocarpus fraseri Coode - (Peninsular Malaysia)
- Elaeocarpus gaussenii Weibel - (India, critically endangered)
- Elaeocarpus gigantifolius Elmer - (Philippines)
- Elaeocarpus glandulifer (Hook. ex Wight) Mast. - (Sri Lanka)
- Elaeocarpus grandis F.Muell. – blue quandong (New South Wales, Queensland)
- Elaeocarpus griffithii (Wight) A.Gray – (Island and mainland Southeast Asia)
- Elaeocarpus hedyosmus Zmarzty - (Sri Lanka)
- Elaeocarpus holopetalus F.Muell. – (New South Wales, Victoria)
- Elaeocarpus homalioides Schltr. – (New Guinea)
- Elaeocarpus hookerianus Raoul – (New Zealand)
- Elaeocarpus hygrophilus Kurz – (Mainland Southeast Asia)
- Elaeocarpus inopinatus Coode – (Borneo)
- Elaeocarpus integrifolius Lam. – (Mauritius)
- Elaeocarpus joga Merr. – (Mariana Islands, Palau)
- Elaeocarpus kirtonii F.Muell. ex F.M.Bailey – silver quandong (Eastern Australia)
- Elaeocarpus lanceifolius Roxb. – (Tropical Asia)
- Elaeocarpus miriensis Weibel – (Borneo)
- Elaeocarpus montanus Thwaites – (Sri Lanka)
- Elaeocarpus moratii Tirel – (New Caledonia)
- Elaeocarpus munroi (Wight) Mast. – (Southern India)
- Elaeocarpus nanus Corner – (Peninsular Malaysia)
- Elaeocarpus obovatus G.Don – (New South Wales, Queensland)
- Elaeocarpus obtusus Blume — (Peninsular Malaysia)
- Elaeocarpus prunifolius (Müll.Berol.) Wall. ex Mast. – (Bangladesh, India)
- Elaeocarpus pseudopaniculatus Corner – (Peninsular Malaysia)
- Elaeocarpus recurvatus Corner – (Southern India)
- Elaeocarpus reticosus Ridl. – (Peninsular Malaysia)
- Elaeocarpus reticulatus Sm. – blueberry ash (eastern Australia)
- Elaeocarpus royenii Weibel – (New Guinea)
- Elaeocarpus rugosus Roxb. ex G.Don – (Peninsular Malaysia, Singapore)
- Elaeocarpus sedentarius Maynard & Crayn – (New South Wales)
- Elaeocarpus serratus L. – (South Asia)
- Elaeocarpus simaluensis Weibel – (Sumatra)
- Elaeocarpus stipularis Blume – (South Asia, Southeast Asia, Papuasia)
- Elaeocarpus subvillosus Arn. – (Sri Lanka)
- Elaeocarpus sylvestris (Lour.) Poir. – (China, Vietnam)
- Elaeocarpus symingtonii Ng – (Peninsular Malaysia)
- Elaeocarpus taprobanicus Zmarzty – (Sri Lanka)
- Elaeocarpus thorelii Pierre – (Cambodia)
- Elaeocarpus tuberculatus Roxb. – (Andaman Is., Bangladesh, India, Jawa, Myanmar)
- Elaeocarpus venustus Bedd. – (Tamil Nadu)
- Elaeocarpus williamsianus Guymer – hairy quandong (New South Wales)
