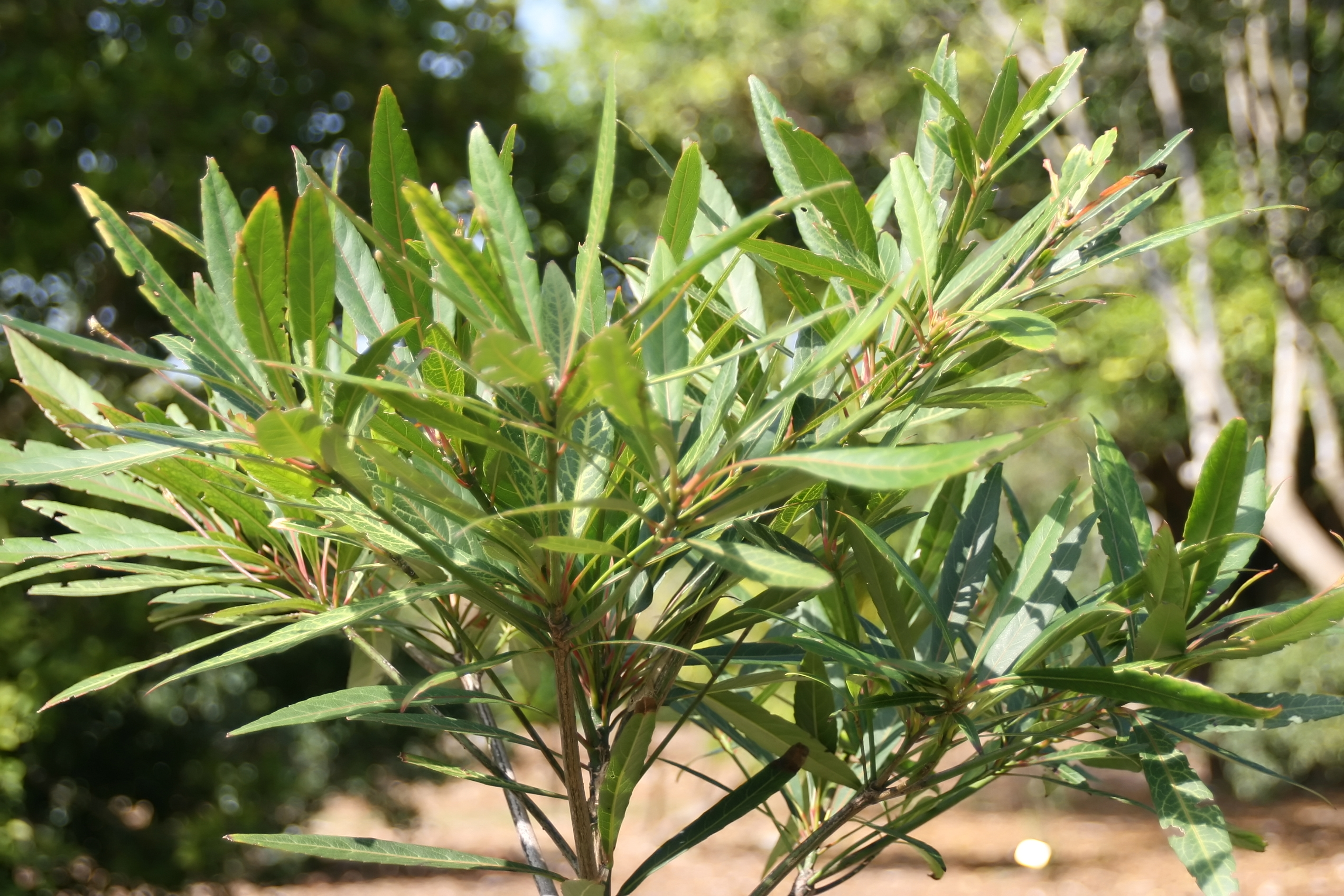

Scientific classification
- Kingdom: Plantae
- Clade: Tracheophytes
- Clade: Angiosperms
- Clade: Eudicots
- Clade: Rosids
- Order: Oxalidales
- Family: Elaeocarpaceae
- Genus: Elaeocarpus
- Species: E. hygrophilus

Binomial name
- Elaeocarpus hygrophilus Kurz

= Elaeocarpus hygrophilus =

Species of flowering plant

Elaeocarpus hygrophilus is a species of plant in the Elaeocarpaceae family. It is distributed in Southeast Asia. The tree is 10–25 metres (33–82 ft) tall. The fruits are olive-like.

The pickled fruits are used as foods in some Southeast Asian countries like Thailand and Vietnam. In Thai, the fruit is known as makok nam (มะกอกน้ำ) and the English name of Thailand's capital, Bangkok, is said to derive from the village of Bang Makok, named after the fruit.
