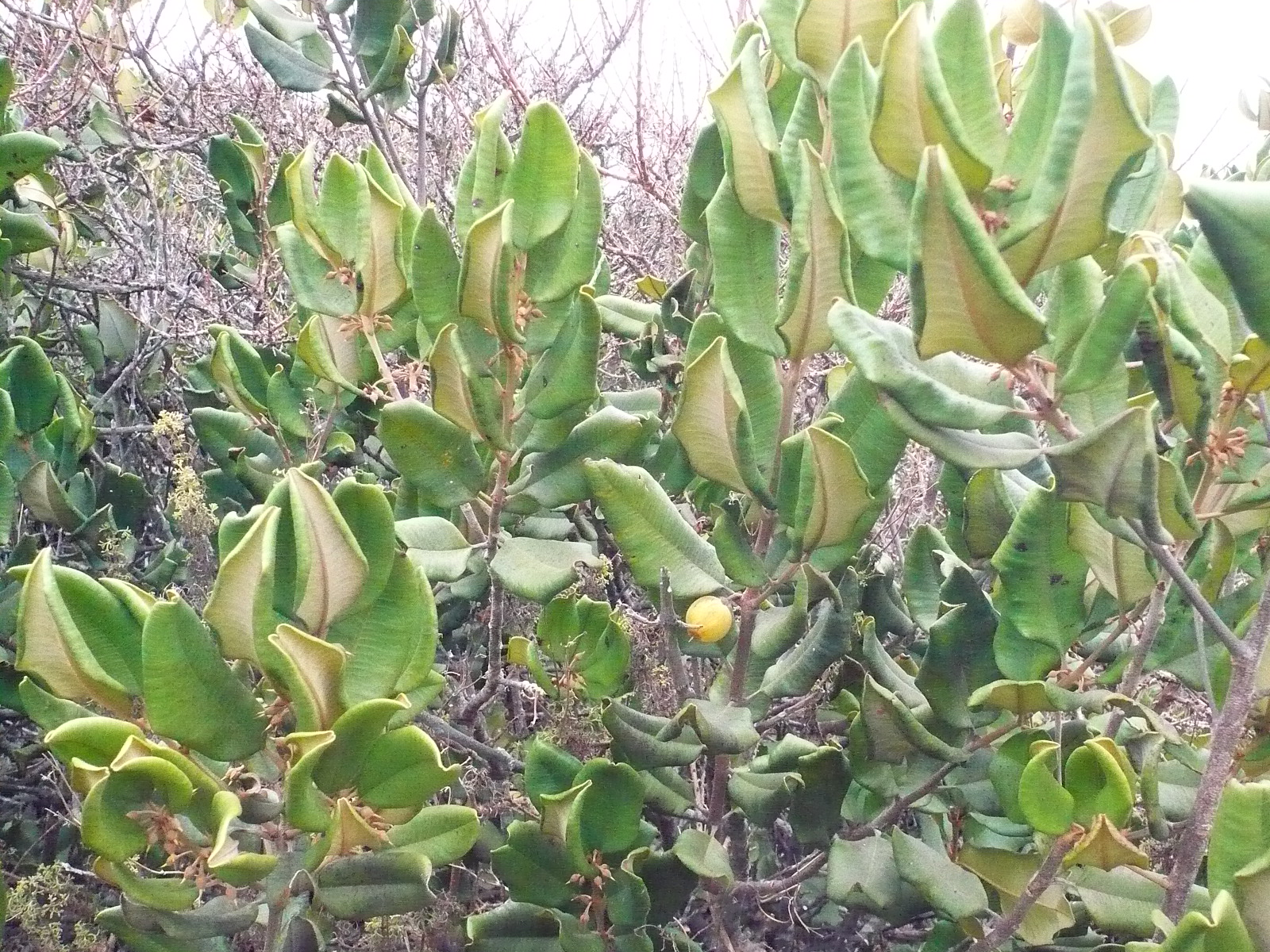

Conservation status
- Endangered (IUCN 3.1)

Scientific classification
- Kingdom: Plantae
- Clade: Embryophytes
- Clade: Tracheophytes
- Clade: Spermatophytes
- Clade: Angiosperms
- Clade: Eudicots
- Clade: Asterids
- Order: Ericales
- Family: Sapotaceae
- Genus: Gayella; Pierre
- Species: G. valparadisaea

Binomial name
- Gayella valparadisaea (Molina) Pierre

Synonyms
- Gayella splendens (A.DC.) Aubrév. (1962); Gayella valparadisaea (Molina) Pierre (1890); Lucuma splendens A.DC. (1844); Lucuma valparadisaea Molina (1782); Pouteria splendens (A.DC.) Kuntze (1898); Vitellaria valparadisaea (Molina) Radlk. ex Dubard (1912)

= Gayella =

Species of flowering plant

Gayella valparadisaea is a species of plant in the family Sapotaceae. It is the sole species in genus Gayella. It is a tree or shrub endemic to the coastal areas of central Chile. It was previously considered to be a member of the genus Pouteria before genetic analysis justified its classification as a separate, monotypic genus. Due to ongoing habitat loss and fragmentation, as well as lack of living seed dispersers, this species is classified as Endangered. It produces an edible fruit similar to that of lúcuma fruit. Common names for this species include "lúcumo silvestre" and "palo colorado".

== Description ==
Gayella valparadisaea is an evergreen tree or shrub that grows up to 5m in height. The leaves are sclerophyllous, oval, and grow either opposite, three-whorled, or alternate.

The flowers are borne in clusters growing from the leaf axils. There are five sepals, and corolla lobes generally number six though are occasionally five. Flowers are generally a pale whiteish color, however the corolla can sometimes contain pink or yellow hues, while the flask-shaped pistil is typically light green shifting to pink towards the stigma.

The fruit is a large, fleshy, single-seeded drupe, ranging from yellow to red. The seed is recalcitrant.

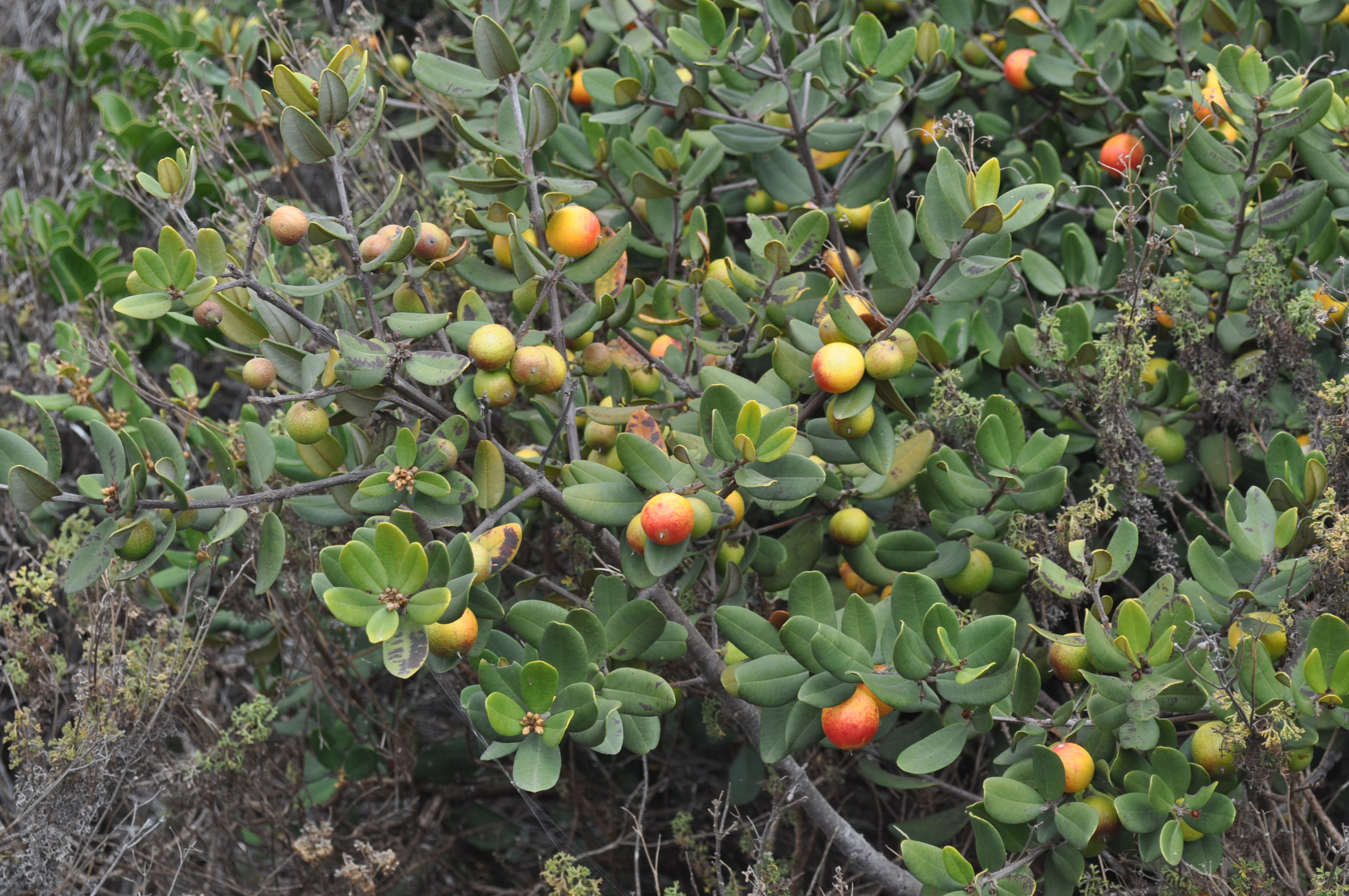
Branches of Gayella valparadisaea bearing leaves and fruits.

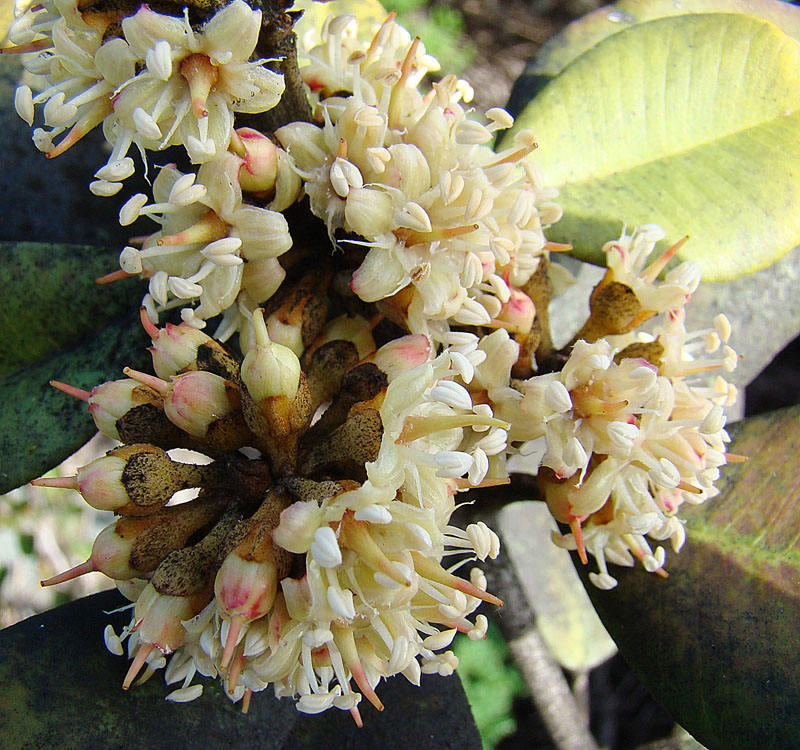
Flowers of Gayella valparadisaea

== Taxonomy ==
Gayella valparadisaea is a member of Sapotaceae, a pantropical family. This species was previously considered to be a member of the genus Pouteria, a group that consists almost entirely of other American species. However, genetic analysis of the subfamily Chrysophylloideae found this species to be nested in an entirely Australasian clade, sister to Australian genus Van-royena. Further genetic study estimated a split between these two species to have occurred around 40.0 million years ago, coinciding approximately with the time frame that South America and Australia are estimated to have separated at the end of the break-up of Gondwana . This analysis has justified the separation of the species from Pouteria into its own genus, Gayella, as had been proposed in 1890 by French botanist Jean Baptiste Louis Pierre.

== Distribution and habitat ==
This species is a narrow endemic with remaining populations limited to coastal, central Chile, particularly the provinces of Choapa and San Antonio. The largest existing natural population is around the town of Los Molles.

The climate of its current range is semiarid, Mediterranean, and typically below an altitude of 100m, where sea mist from the nearby ocean acts as a source of moisture. Smaller subpopulations exist up to 400m in elevation. Its habitat consists of heterogenous rocky slopes, gullies, and ravines.

== Ecology ==
There are no living mammalian frugivores large enough or birds with a large enough gape to act as effective seed dispersers to the plant, while extant vertebrates have shown low seed-dispersal effectiveness. Researchers have hypothesized that seed dispersal was previously carried out by megafauna that have gone extinct since human arrival. There are, however, extant seed predators. Leaf litter has been found to increase seed survival by limiting seed predation, and also potentially improving germination conditions with greater maintained soil moisture. Pollination has not been closely studied in this species.

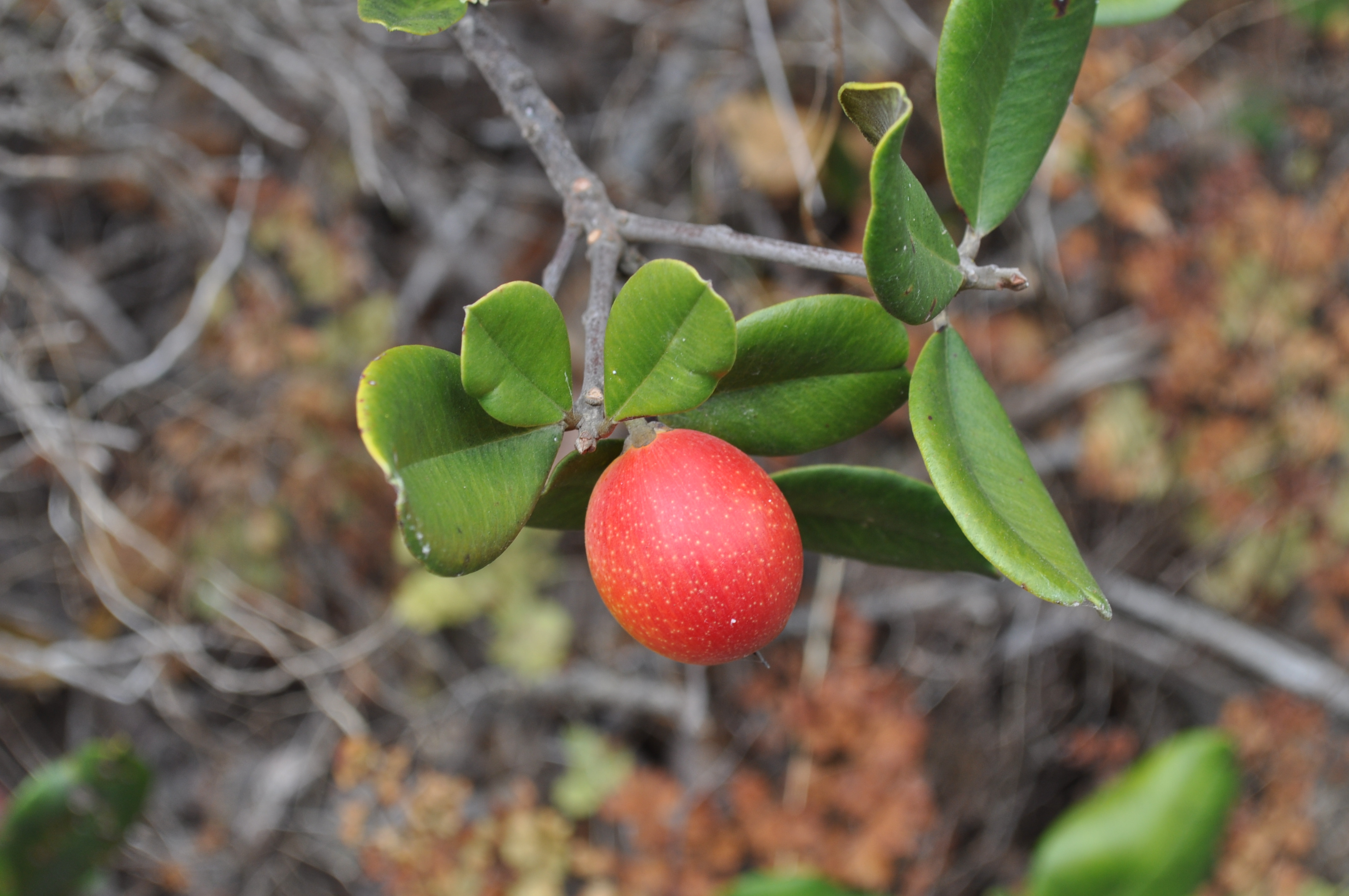
The fruit of Gayella valparadisaea bears a large seed that is not dispersed by any living, native animals.

== Conservation status ==
Gayella valparadisaea is currently classified by the IUCN Red List as Endangered. Primary threats to the species are severe loss and fragmentation of habitat caused by development. Projected increase in drought frequency, fires, and other shifts under climate change are predicted to affect this plant.

Researchers investigating genetic structure and genetic diversity between and within extant populations found evidence suggesting that the species historically had a larger and more continuous metapopulation that has only recently become fragmented. While current genetic diversity is relatively high between the fragmented populations, declines in genetic diversity due to fragmentation and low dispersal are proposed to be a potential threat to the species.
