= Chloroluma =

Scientific classification
- Kingdom: Plantae
- Clade: Tracheophytes
- Clade: Angiosperms
- Clade: Eudicots
- Clade: Asterids
- Order: Ericales
- Family: Sapotaceae
- Subfamily: Chrysophylloideae
- Genus: Chloroluma; Baill.

Synonyms
- Fibrocentrum Pierre ex Glaziou

Genus of plants

Chloroluma is a genus of flowering plants in the family Sapotaceae. It includes two species, which are native to Brazil, Bolivia, Paraguay, Uruguay, and northwestern Argentina.

- Chloroluma gonocarpa (Mart. & Eichler) Baill. ex Aubrév. – Brazil, Bolivia, Paraguay, Uruguay, and northwestern Argentina
- Chloroluma viridis (Mart. & Eichler) Aubrév. – eastern and southern Brazil
