= Labatia psammophila =

Conservation status
- Near Threatened (IUCN 3.1)

Scientific classification
- Kingdom: Plantae
- Clade: Tracheophytes
- Clade: Angiosperms
- Clade: Eudicots
- Clade: Asterids
- Order: Ericales
- Family: Sapotaceae
- Genus: Labatia
- Species: L. psammophila

Binomial name
- Labatia psammophila Mart.

Synonyms
- Achras ferruginea Casar.; Guapeba nitida (A.DC.) Pierre; Guapeba psammophila (Mart.) Pierre; Lucuma nitida A.DC.; Lucuma psammophila (Mart.) A.DC.; Lucuma psammophila var. xestophylla Miq.; Pouteria crassinervia Engl.; Pouteria nitida (A.DC.) Radlk.; Pouteria psammophila (Mart.) Radlk.; Pouteria psammophila var. typica Baehni; Pouteria psammophila var. xestophylla (Miq.) Baehni; Pseudolabatia psammophila (Mart.) Aubrév.; Sapota ferruginea (Casar.) Walp.; Xantolis psammophila (Mart.) Baehni

Species of flowering plant

Labatia psammophila is a species of flowering plant in the family Sapotaceae. It is a shrub or tree which grows up to 23 meters tall. It is endemic to the Atlantic Forest eastern Brazil, where it is found in the states of Bahia, Espírito Santo, Minas Gerais, Rio de Janeiro, and São Paulo. It grows tropical moist lowland forest and coastal restinga forest.
