= Labatia =

Scientific classification
- Kingdom: Plantae
- Clade: Tracheophytes
- Clade: Angiosperms
- Clade: Eudicots
- Clade: Asterids
- Order: Ericales
- Family: Sapotaceae
- Subfamily: Chrysophylloideae
- Genus: Labatia; Sw.

Synonyms
- Eglerodendron Aubrév. & Pellegr.; Neolabatia Aubrév.; Pseudolabatia Aubrév. & Pellegr.

Genus of flowering plants

Labatia is a genus of flowering plants in the family Sapotaceae. It includes 16 species native to the tropical Americas, ranging from Nicaragua and the Caribbean to northeastern Argentina.

== Species ==
There are 16 species assigned to this genus:

- Labatia beaurepairei (Glaz. & Raunk.) Engl.
- Labatia ciliata (Alves-Araújo & M.Alves) Alves-Araújo
- Labatia confusa (Alves-Araújo & M.Alves) Alves-Araújo
- Labatia filipes (Eyma) Alves-Araújo
- Labatia fimbriata (Baehni) Alves-Araújo
- Labatia gardneriana (A.DC.) Alves-Araújo
- Labatia lecythidicarpa (P.E.Sánchez & Poveda) Swenson & Alves-Araújo
- Labatia nordestinensis (Alves-Araújo & M.Alves) Alves-Araújo
- Labatia pariry (Ducke) Alves-Araújo
- Labatia petiolata (T.D.Penn.) Alves-Araújo
- Labatia psammophila Mart.
- Labatia resinosa (T.D.Penn.) Alves-Araújo
- Labatia salicifolia (Spreng.) Mart.
- Labatia sessiliflora Sw.
- Labatia singularis (T.D.Penn.) Alves-Araújo
- Labatia subcaerulea (Pierre ex Dubard) Alves-Araújo
