= Labatia beaurepairei =

Conservation status
- Conservation Dependent (IUCN 2.3)

Scientific classification
- Kingdom: Plantae
- Clade: Embryophytes
- Clade: Tracheophytes
- Clade: Spermatophytes
- Clade: Angiosperms
- Clade: Eudicots
- Clade: Asterids
- Order: Ericales
- Family: Sapotaceae
- Genus: Labatia
- Species: L. beaurepairei

Binomial name
- Labatia beaurepairei (Glaz. & Raunk.) Engl.

Synonyms
- Lucuma beaurepairei Glaz. & Raunk.; Pouteria beaurepairei (Glaz. & Raunk.) Baehni; Pseudolabatia beaurepairei (Glaz. & Raunk.) Aubrév.

Species of flowering plant

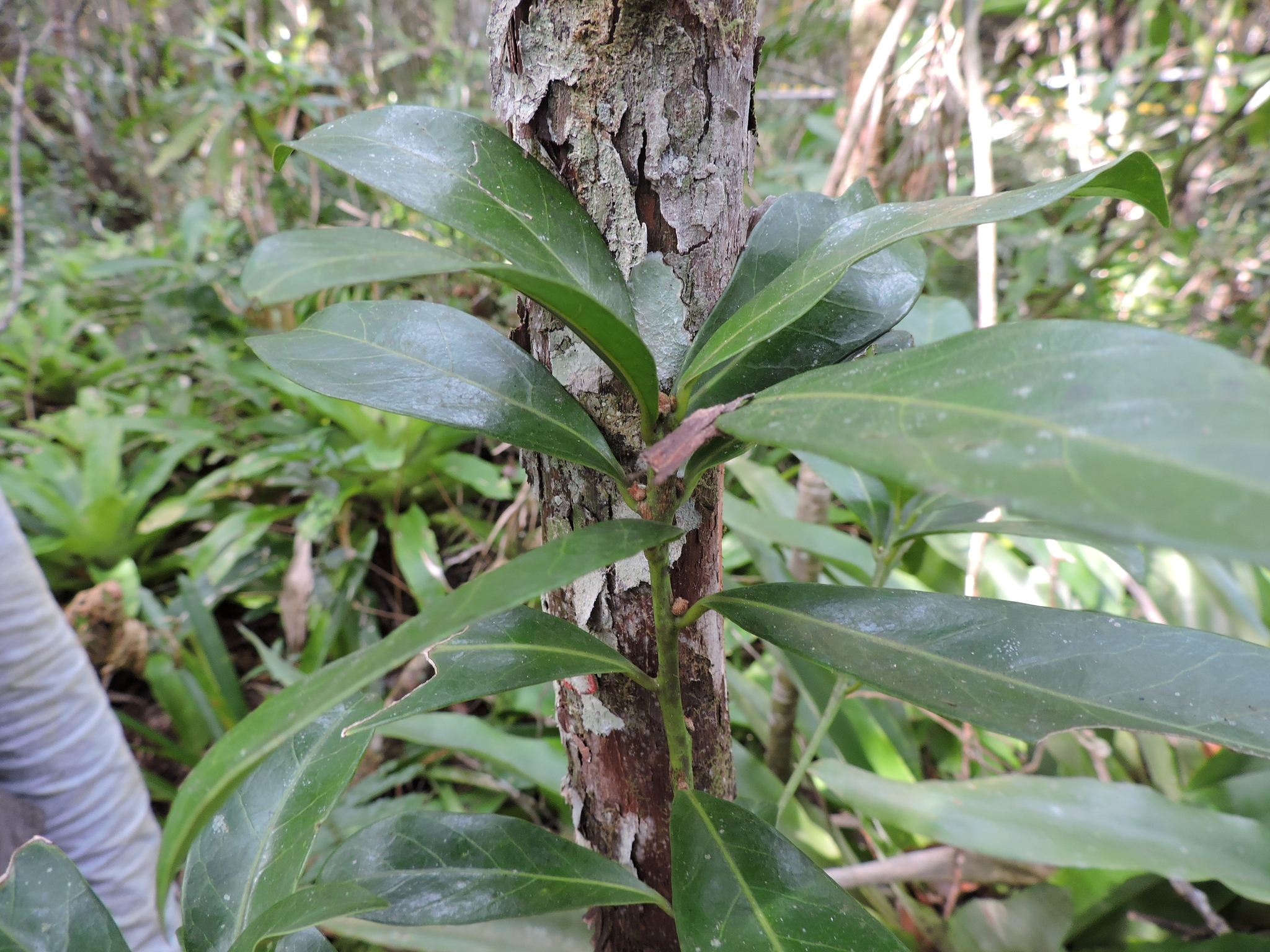
Labatia beaurepairei

Labatia beaurepairei is a species of flowering plant in the family Sapotaceae. It is endemic to the Atlantic Forest of eastern and southern Brazil, ranging from southeastern Bahia state in the north to Santa Catarina in the south.
