= Chromolucuma congestifolia =

Conservation status
- Vulnerable (IUCN 2.3)

Scientific classification
- Kingdom: Plantae
- Clade: Tracheophytes
- Clade: Angiosperms
- Clade: Eudicots
- Clade: Asterids
- Order: Ericales
- Family: Sapotaceae
- Genus: Chromolucuma
- Species: C. congestifolia

Binomial name
- Chromolucuma congestifolia (Pilz) Alves-Araújo & M.Alves (2012)

Synonyms
- Pouteria congestifolia Pilz (1981)

Species of flowering plant

Chromolucuma congestifolia, formerly known as Pouteria congestifolia, is a species of plant in the family Sapotaceae. It is a tree native to Costa Rica and Panama.
