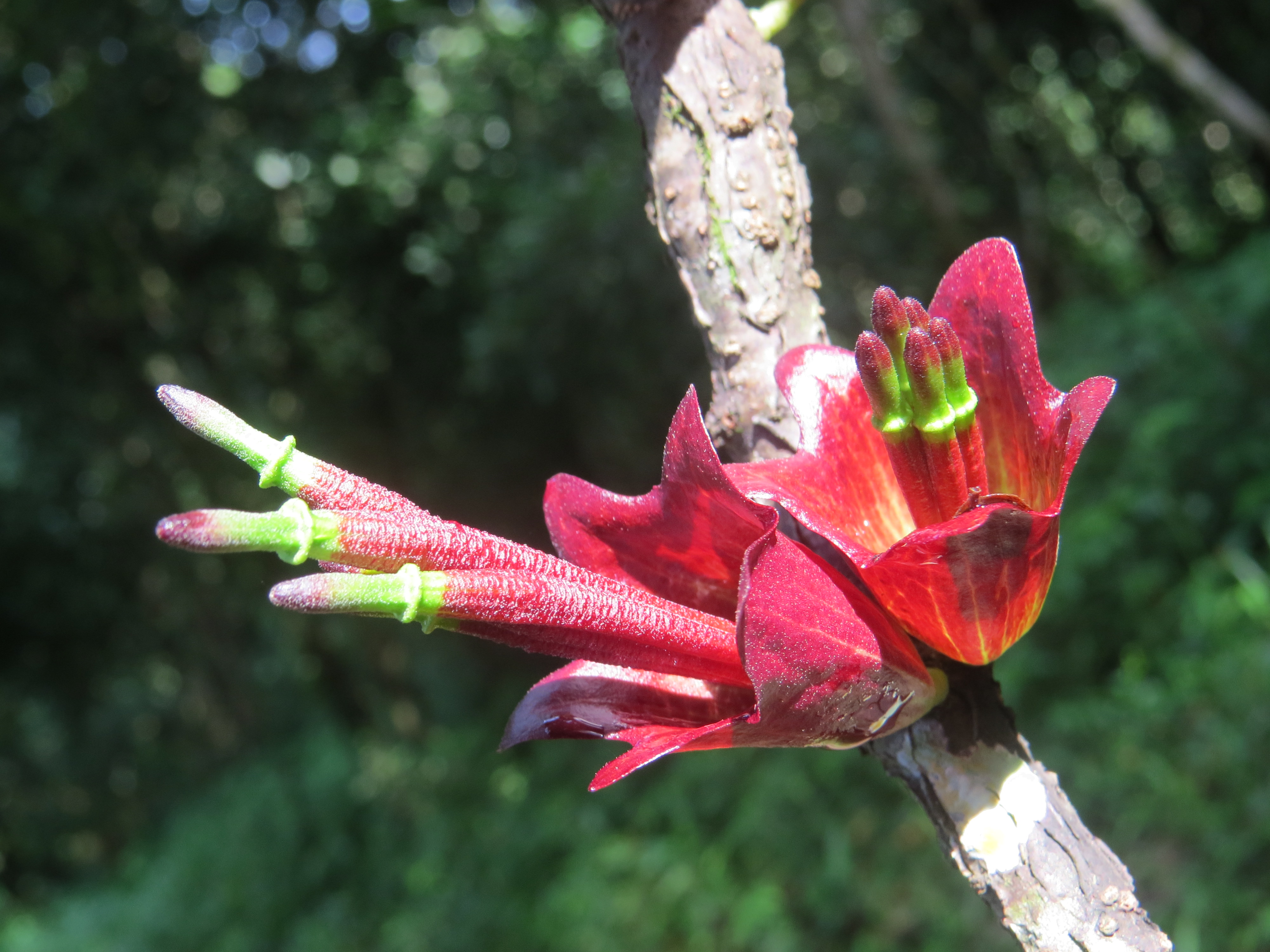
- Tolypanthus lagenifer from Aralam WLS

Scientific classification
- Kingdom: Plantae
- Clade: Tracheophytes
- Clade: Angiosperms
- Clade: Eudicots
- Order: Santalales
- Family: Loranthaceae
- Genus: Tolypanthus
- Species: T. lagenifer

Binomial name
- Tolypanthus lagenifer Tiegh 1895

= Tolypanthus lagenifer =

Species of mistletoe

Tolypanthus lagenifer, the Indian tolypanthus, is a parasitic shrub, native to southwest India in Matheran, Maharashtra. It is hosted on the tree Xantolis tomentosa, and flowers between July and September.
