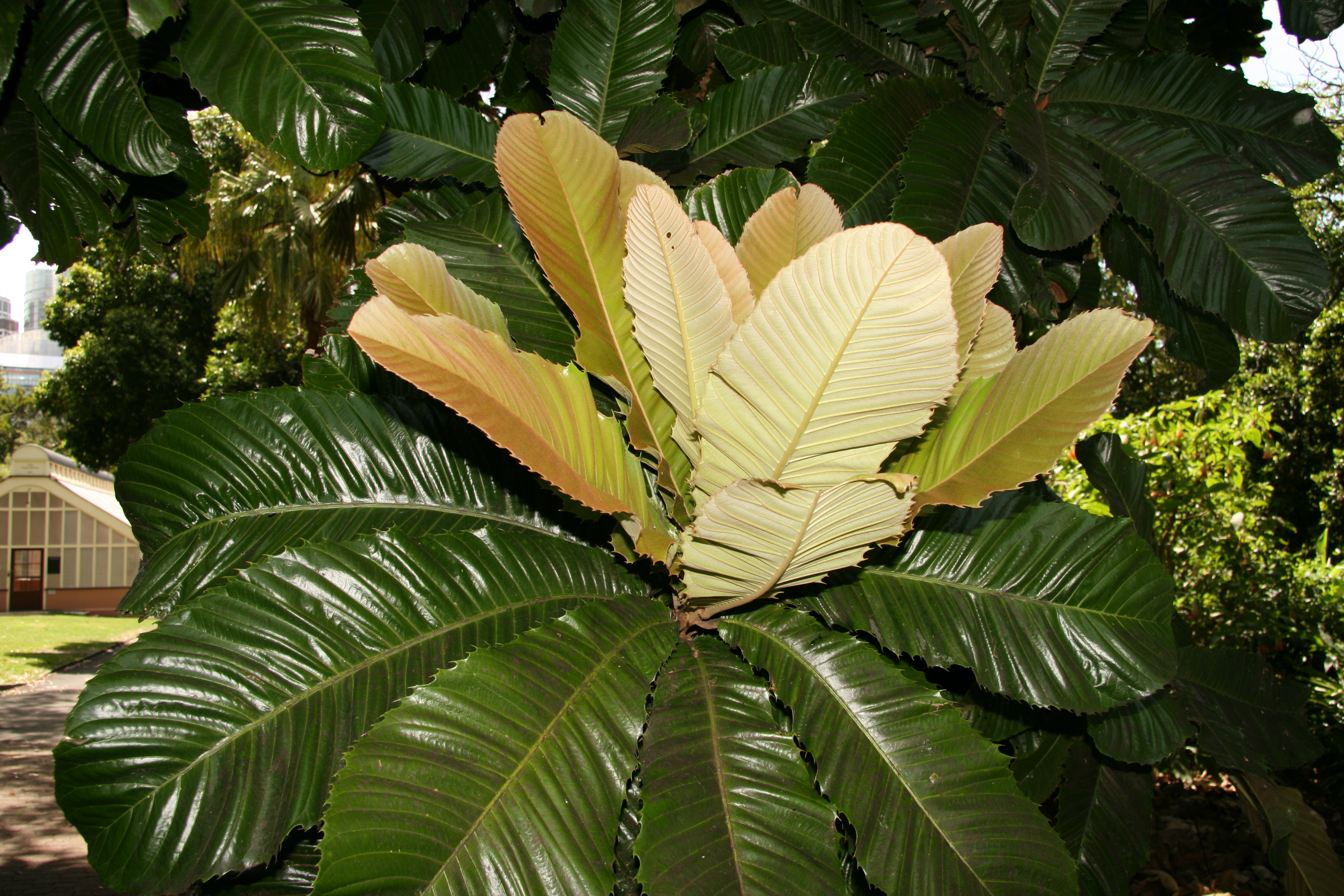
- golden new growth, Royal Botanic Gardens, Sydney

Conservation status
- Endangered (IUCN 3.1)

Scientific classification
- Kingdom: Plantae
- Clade: Tracheophytes
- Clade: Angiosperms
- Clade: Eudicots
- Clade: Asterids
- Order: Ericales
- Family: Sapotaceae
- Genus: Martiusella; Pierre
- Species: M. imperialis

Binomial name
- Martiusella imperialis (Linden ex K.Koch & Fintelm.) Pierre

Synonyms
- Curatella imperialis (Linden ex K.Koch & Fintelm.) Baill.; Theophrasta imperialis Linden ex K.Koch & Fintelm.; Chloroluma imperialis (Linden ex K.Koch & Fintelm.) Aubrév.; Chrysophyllum imperiale (Linden ex K.Koch & Fintelm.) Benth. ex Salomon; Planchonella imperialis (Linden ex K.Koch & Fintelm.) Baehni

= Martiusella =

Species of flowering plant

Martiusella imperialis is a tropical tree of the family Sapotaceae native to eastern Brazil. It is the sole species in genus Martiusella. It is currently classified as an endangered species. Its fruits were very much appreciated by the first emperor of Brazil, Pedro I and his son Pedro II, who exported specimens of the tree as an offering to various botanical gardens around the world, including Sydney and Lisbon.

== Distribution ==
It is endemic to the Atlantic Forest ecoregion of eastern Brazil, native to the states of Bahia, Minas Gerais, Rio de Janeiro, and São Paulo, including the vicinity of Rio de Janeiro. Most of its habitat has been erased by urbanisation and city spread. It is a component of lowland rainforest up to 800 m (2,600 ft) elevation, where it grows to be a part of the canopy.

== Description ==
Martiusella imperialis has large firm roundish cuneate-oblanceolate leaves, which measure 15 to 75 cm (6 to 29.5 in) long and 5–25 cm (2–10 in) wide. They are smooth above and finely furred on the undersurface, and have a prominent midrib. The leaf margins are serrated, which is an unusual characteristic for the subfamily to which it belongs.

== Taxonomy ==
This species was first described in 1859 as Theophrastia imperialis, before being given its current name by Joseph Dalton Hooker and George Bentham. It was also classified as Martusiella imperialis by French botanist J.B. Louis Pierre in 1891. It is known locally in Brazil as Marmelleiro do matto. In 1991 it was placed in section Aneuchrysophyllum of the genus Chrysophyllum, along with C. bangweolense and C. venezuelanense. However a combined DNA and morphological study of the subfamily Chrysophylloideae found the two main genera, Chrysophyllum and Pouteria, to be highly polyphyletic, and that C. imperiale is not closely related to other members of the genus but instead the genus Elaeoluma. The study authors recommended resurrecting the binomial name Martusiella imperialis pending further resolution of relationships within the subfamily.

== Cultivation ==
An imposing specimen tree in the Royal Botanic Gardens, Sydney was planted by Prince Alfred, Duke of Edinburgh in 1868. Seeds from this plant have been sent to Rio de Janeiro to facilitate recovery of the species there. Three specimens are growing in the Royal Botanic Gardens in Melbourne.

It can be grown as a container plant.
