= Sarcosperma paniculatum =

Conservation status
- Least Concern (IUCN 3.1)

Scientific classification
- Kingdom: Plantae
- Clade: Tracheophytes
- Clade: Angiosperms
- Clade: Eudicots
- Clade: Asterids
- Order: Ericales
- Family: Sapotaceae
- Genus: Sarcosperma
- Species: S. paniculatum

Binomial name
- Sarcosperma paniculatum (King) Stapf & King

Synonyms
- Apoia macrocarpa (Elmer) Merr.; Bracea paniculata King; Discocalyx macrocarpa Elmer; Sarcosperma breviracemosum H.J.Lam

Species of tree

Sarcosperma paniculatum is a tree in the family Sapotaceae. The specific epithet paniculatum means 'loosely branched', referring to the flowers.

== Description ==
Sarcosperma paniculatum grows up to 40 metres (130 ft) tall with a trunk diameter of up to 70 cm (30 in). The flowers are yellow to greenish-white. The fruits are ovoid to round, ripening red and purplish-black, up to 2 cm (1 in) in diameter.

== Distribution and habitat ==
The habitat of Sarcosperma paniculatum is secondary forests to open areas from 130–1,300 m (400–4,300 ft) elevation. The species is native to Sumatra, Peninsular Malaysia, Borneo, the Lesser Sunda Islands, Sulawesi, the Maluku Islands, New Guinea and the Philippines.
