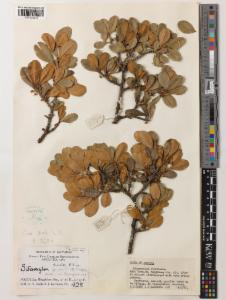

Conservation status
- Vulnerable (IUCN 3.1)

Scientific classification
- Kingdom: Plantae
- Clade: Tracheophytes
- Clade: Angiosperms
- Clade: Eudicots
- Clade: Asterids
- Order: Ericales
- Family: Sapotaceae
- Genus: Spiniluma
- Species: S. discolor

Binomial name
- Spiniluma discolor (Radcl.-Sm.) Friis (1978)

Synonyms
- Sideroxylon discolor Radcl.-Sm. (1971)

= Spiniluma discolor =

Species of plant

Spiniluma discolor is a species of plant in the family Sapotaceae. It is endemic to the Hajhir Mountains on the island of Socotra in Yemen. It is uncommon in dense montane woodland from 600 to 1,000 metres elevation.
