= Labatia petiolata =

Conservation status
- Vulnerable (IUCN 2.3)

Scientific classification
- Kingdom: Plantae
- Clade: Tracheophytes
- Clade: Angiosperms
- Clade: Eudicots
- Clade: Asterids
- Order: Ericales
- Family: Sapotaceae
- Genus: Labatia
- Species: L. petiolata

Binomial name
- Labatia petiolata (T.D.Penn.) Alves-Araújo

Synonyms
- Pouteria petiolata T.D.Penn.

Species of flowering plant

Labatia petiolata is a species of plant in the family Sapotaceae. It is native to Colombia (Caquetá), Brazil (Amazonas and Pará states), and central Bolivia, where it grows in terre firme (non-flooded) Amazon rainforest. It is threatened by habitat loss from continued logging in its native forests.
