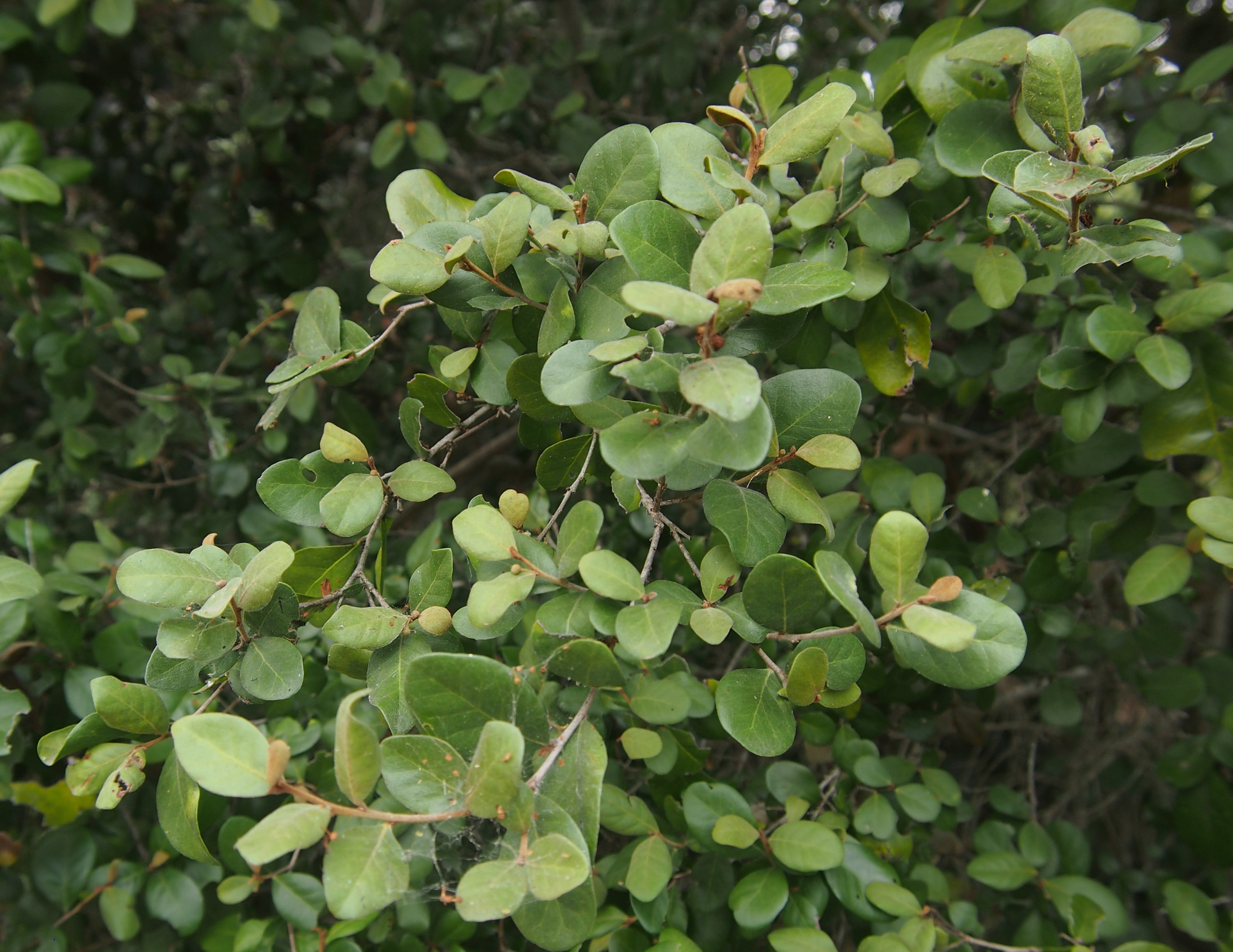

Scientific classification
- Kingdom: Plantae
- Clade: Tracheophytes
- Clade: Angiosperms
- Clade: Eudicots
- Clade: Asterids
- Order: Ericales
- Family: Sapotaceae
- Genus: Sersalisia
- Species: S. sericea

Binomial name
- Sersalisia sericea (Aiton) R.Br.

Synonyms
- Pouteria sericea

= Sersalisia sericea =

Species of plant

Sersalisia sericea, also known as wild prune, mangarr, and mongo is a species of shrubs or small trees, of the plant family Sapotaceae They grow naturally in monsoon forest, littoral rainforest, and occasionally in more open forest types across Northern Australia.

Sersalisia sericea grows to 6 metres tall, although it may produce fruit as a shrub of 1 metre. The plant is characterised by the densely, rusty brown hairs that cover the buds and young leaves. Clusters of small green-white flowers are followed by succulent, dark purple fruit, containing one or occasionally two seeds. The fruit are succulent and edible.

The Kunwinjku people of Western Arnhem Land call the plant and fruit "mandangnud". As well as being a bush food, the seeds are occasionally used in seed jewellery for sale to tourists in the region.
