= Pichonia daenikeri =

Conservation status
- Vulnerable (IUCN 3.1)

Scientific classification
- Kingdom: Plantae
- Clade: Tracheophytes
- Clade: Angiosperms
- Clade: Eudicots
- Clade: Asterids
- Order: Ericales
- Family: Sapotaceae
- Genus: Pichonia
- Species: P. daenikeri

Binomial name
- Pichonia daenikeri (Aubrév.) Swenson, Bartish & Munzinger

Synonyms
- Planchonella daenikeri Aubrév.

Species of flowering plant

Pichonia daenikeri is a species of plant in the family Sapotaceae. It is endemic to New Caledonia.
