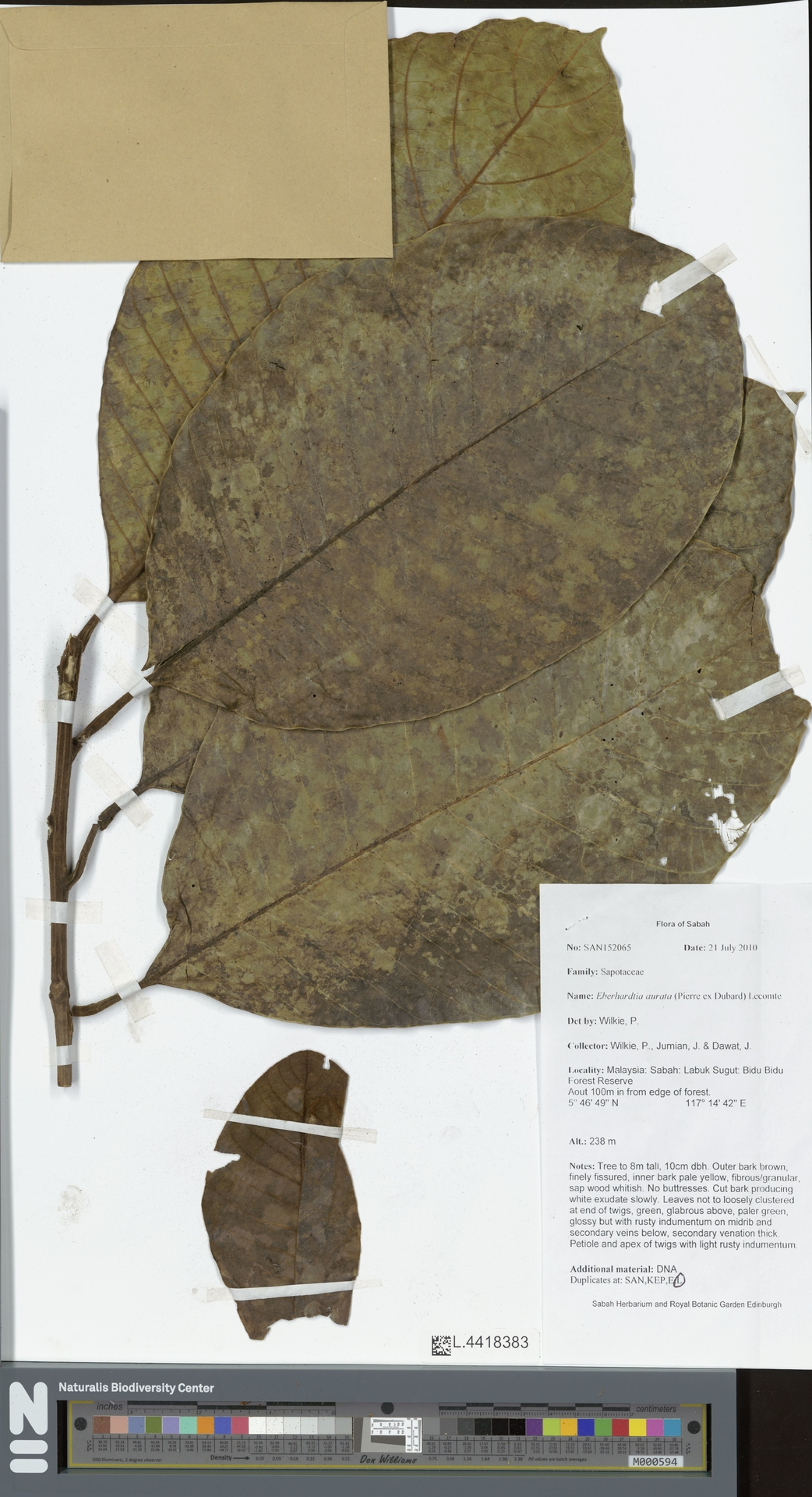

Scientific classification
- Kingdom: Plantae
- Clade: Tracheophytes
- Clade: Angiosperms
- Clade: Eudicots
- Clade: Asterids
- Order: Ericales
- Family: Sapotaceae
- Genus: Eberhardtia
- Species: E. aurata

Binomial name
- Eberhardtia aurata (Pierre ex Dubard) Lecomte

Synonyms
- Planchonella aurata Pierre ex Dubard; Pouteria aurata (Pierre ex Dubard) Baehni

= Eberhardtia aurata =

Species of tree

Eberhardtia aurata is a plant in the family Sapotaceae. It grows as a tree up to 8 metres (30 ft) tall. The twigs are rusty brown. Fruit is subglobose, rusty-brown, up to 5 centimetres (2 in) long. Its habitat is forests. E. aurata is found in China and northern Vietnam.
