= Delpydora =

Scientific classification
- Kingdom: Plantae
- Clade: Tracheophytes
- Clade: Angiosperms
- Clade: Eudicots
- Clade: Asterids
- Order: Ericales
- Family: Sapotaceae
- Subfamily: Chrysophylloideae
- Genus: Delpydora; Pierre 1897 not A.Chev. 1917

Type species
- Delpydora macrophylla Pierre

Synonyms
- Delpydora A.Chev. 1917, illegitimate homonym, not Pierre 1897

Genus of flowering plants

Delpydora is a genus of plant in the family Sapotaceae described as a genus in 1897 .

The genus is native to western and central Africa.

Species

1. Delpydora gracilis A.Chev. - Ivory Coast, Ghana, Liberia, Gabon
2. Delpydora macrophylla Pierre - Cameroon, Gabon, Congo Republic
