= Sarcaulus =

Scientific classification
- Kingdom: Plantae
- Clade: Tracheophytes
- Clade: Angiosperms
- Clade: Eudicots
- Clade: Asterids
- Order: Ericales
- Family: Sapotaceae
- Subfamily: Chrysophylloideae
- Genus: Sarcaulus; Radlk.

Genus of flowering plants

Sarcaulus is a genus of plants in the family Sapotaceae described as a genus in 1882.

Sarcaulus is native to tropical Central and South America.

Species

1. Sarcaulus brasiliensis (A.DC) Eyma - from Costa Rica to Bolivia + Amapá
2. Sarcaulus inflexus (A.C.Sm.) T.D.Penn. - Amazonas, Mato Grosso
3. Sarcaulus oblatus T.D.Penn. - Ecuador
4. Sarcaulus vestitus (Baehni) T.D.Penn. - Amazonas, Acre
5. Sarcaulus wurdackii Aubrév. - Amazonas Region in Peru
