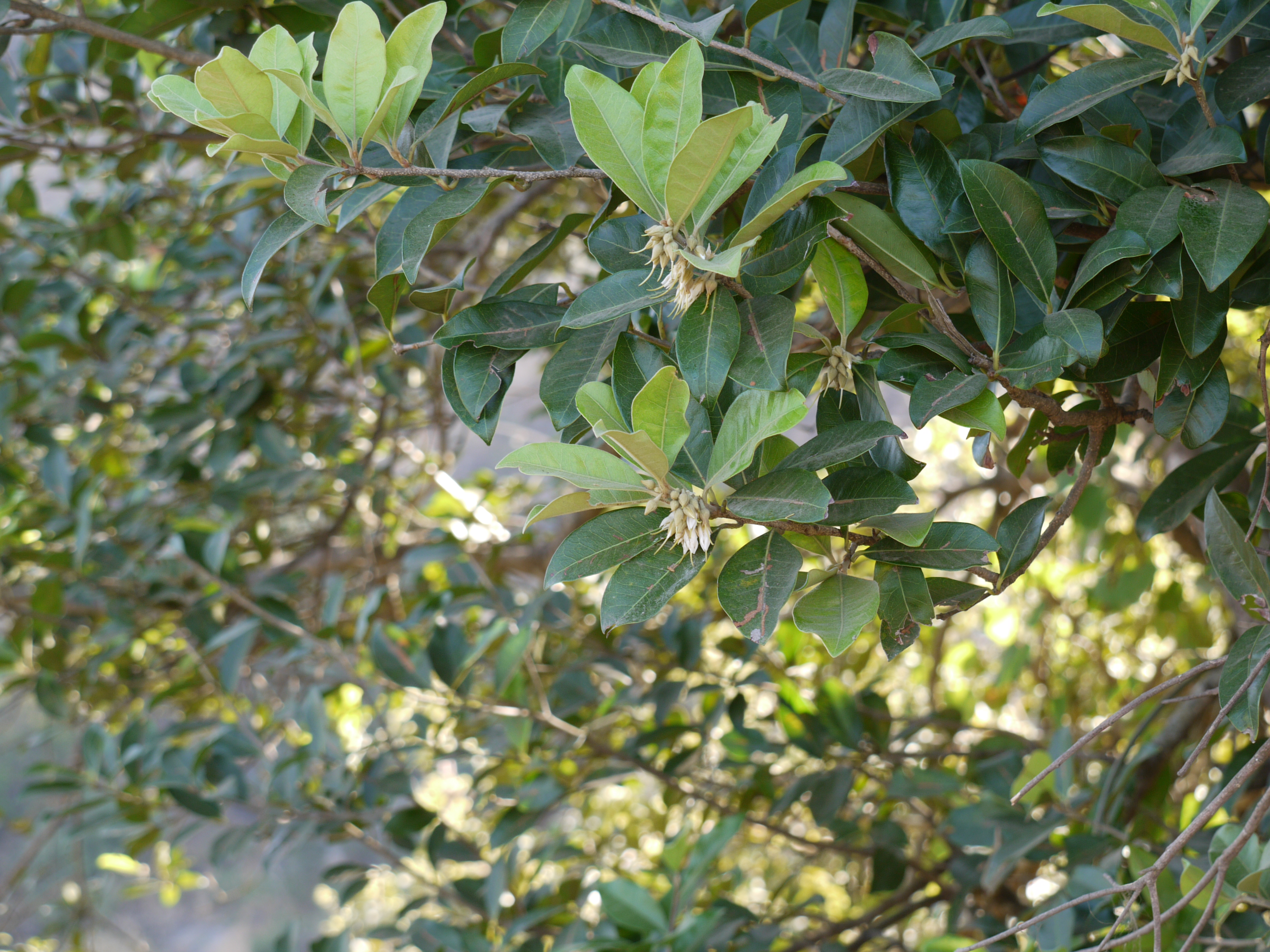

Scientific classification
- Kingdom: Plantae
- Clade: Tracheophytes
- Clade: Angiosperms
- Clade: Eudicots
- Clade: Asterids
- Order: Ericales
- Family: Sapotaceae
- Genus: Xantolis
- Species: X. tomentosa

Binomial name
- Xantolis tomentosa (Roxb.) Raf.

= Xantolis tomentosa =

Species of tree

Xantolis tomentosa, the wooly ironwood, is a forest tree commonly found in India, Sri Lanka and a few other nearby countries.
