= Pichonia =

Scientific classification
- Kingdom: Plantae
- Clade: Tracheophytes
- Clade: Angiosperms
- Clade: Eudicots
- Clade: Asterids
- Order: Ericales
- Family: Sapotaceae
- Subfamily: Chrysophylloideae
- Genus: Pichonia; Pierre

Synonyms
- Rhamnoluma Baill.; Epiluma Baill.; Arnanthus Baehni; Wokoia Baehni

Genus of trees

Pichonia is a group of trees in the Sapotaceae described as a genus in 1890.

Species are hermaphroditic trees growing to 30 metres tall. Leaves are opposite or subopposite and clustered at the ends of branches. Flowers are cup-shaped or campanulate, grouped in inflorescences, and red or white. The 5–8 corolla tubes are often shorter than the lobes, and the calyx forms of single whorl of five quncuncial sepals. Fruits usually have a single seed.

Pichonia is native to New Caledonia, New Guinea and nearby Islands in Indonesia and Papuasia. Species grow in rain forests or on rocky and well-drained ridges or slopes at low elevations. The New Caledonia species are restricted to ultramafic soils.

== Species ==
13 species are accepted.

1. Pichonia balansae (Baehni) Swenson & Munzinger - New Caledonia
2. Pichonia balansana Pierre - New Caledonia and Loyalty Islands
3. Pichonia daenikeri (Aubrév.) Swenson, Bartish & Munzinger - New Caledonia
4. Pichonia deplanchei (Baill.) Swenson & Munzinger - New Caledonia
5. Pichonia dubia (Pierre ex Guillaumin) Swenson & Munzinger - New Caledonia
6. Pichonia grandiflora Swenson & Munzinger - New Caledonia
7. Pichonia hochreutineri (H.J.Lam) Swenson – New Guinea
8. Pichonia lauterbachiana (H.J.Lam) T.D.Penn. - New Guinea, Maluku, and Bismarck Archipelago
9. Pichonia lecomtei (Guillaumin) T.D.Penn. - New Caledonia
10. Pichonia munzingeri Gâteblé & Swenson – New Caledonia
11. Pichonia occidentalis (H.J.Lam) Aubrév. - New Guinea and Maluku
12. Pichonia rhopalocarpa (P.Royen) Swenson – western New Guinea
13. Pichonia sessiliflora (C.T.White) Aubrév. - Solomon Islands
