= Amorphospermum =

Scientific classification
- Kingdom: Plantae
- Clade: Tracheophytes
- Clade: Angiosperms
- Clade: Eudicots
- Clade: Asterids
- Order: Ericales
- Family: Sapotaceae
- Subfamily: Chrysophylloideae
- Genus: Amorphospermum; F.Muell.
- Species: A. antilogum

Binomial name
- Amorphospermum antilogum F.Muell.

Synonyms
- Lucuma amorphosperma F.M.Bailey; Sersalisia antiloga (F.Muell.) Domin; Chrysophyllum antilogum (F.Muell.) Vink; Niemeyera antiloga (F.Muell.) T.D.Penn.

Genus of flowering plants

Amorphospermum is a genus of plants in the family Sapotaceae described as a genus in 1870.

There is only one accepted species, Amorphospermum antilogum, native to Queensland, New South Wales, and Papua New Guinea.

formerly included

now in other genera: Elaeoluma Englerophytum Niemeyera Pycnandra Synsepalum

- A. balansae - Pycnandra balansae
- A. cerasiferum - Synsepalum cerasiferum
- A. chartaceum - Niemeyera chartacea
- A. msolo - Synsepalum msolo
- A. natalense - Englerophytum natalense
- A. pruniferum - Niemeyera prunifera
- A. schomburgkianum - Elaeoluma schomburgkiana
- A. whitei - Niemeyera whitei
