= Diploon =

Scientific classification
- Kingdom: Plantae
- Clade: Tracheophytes
- Clade: Angiosperms
- Clade: Eudicots
- Clade: Asterids
- Order: Ericales
- Family: Sapotaceae
- Subfamily: Chrysophylloideae
- Genus: Diploon; Cronquist
- Species: D. cuspidatum

Binomial name
- Diploon cuspidatum (Hoehne) Cronquist

Synonyms
- Diploön, spelling variant; Chrysophyllum cuspidatum Hoehne; Diploon venezuelana Aubrév.

Genus of flowering plants

Diploon is a genus of plant in the family Sapotaceae described as a genus in 1946.

There is only one known species, Diploon cuspidatum, native to South America (Brazil, Venezuela, Guyana, Bolivia, Peru, Ecuador).
