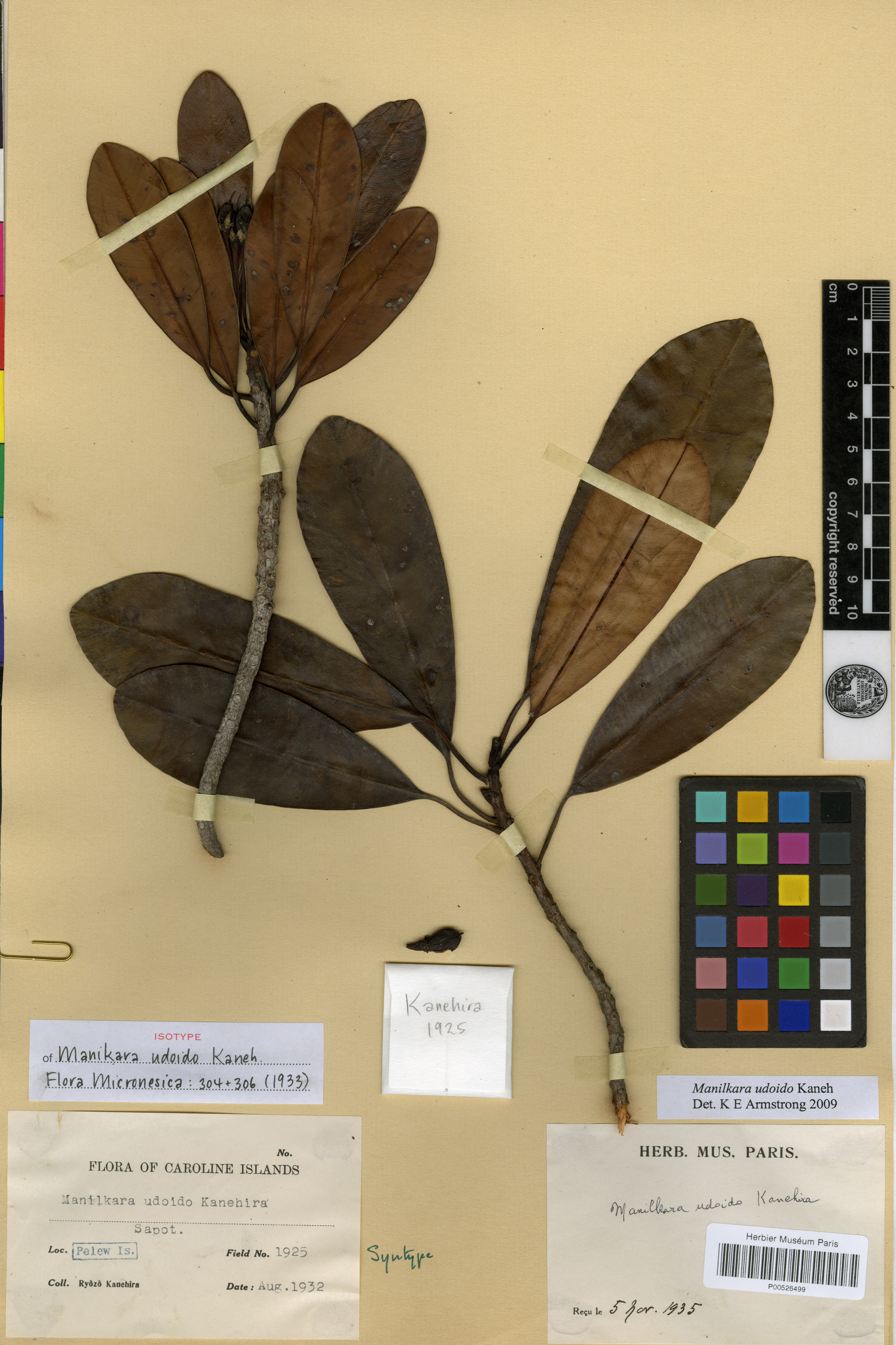

Conservation status
- Vulnerable (IUCN 3.1)

Scientific classification
- Kingdom: Plantae
- Clade: Tracheophytes
- Clade: Angiosperms
- Clade: Eudicots
- Clade: Asterids
- Order: Ericales
- Family: Sapotaceae
- Genus: Abebaia; Baehni (1964)
- Species: A. fasciculata

Binomial name
- Abebaia fasciculata (Warb.) Baehni (1964)

Synonyms
- Manilkara calophylloides H.J.Lam (1925); Manilkara fasciculata (Warb.) H.J.Lam & Maas Geest. (1941); Manilkara merrilliana H.J.Lam (1941); Manilkara teysmannii Dubard (1915); Mimusops calophylloides Merr. (1915), nom. illeg.; Mimusops fasciculata Warb. (1891); Northia fasciculata (Warb.) H.J.Lam (1925)

= Abebaia =

Genus of flowering plants

Abebaia fasciculata is species of flowering plant in the family Sapotaceae. It is a tree native to Malesia (Borneo, Sulawesi, the Lesser Sunda Islands, Maluku, and the Philippines) and New Guinea. It is the sole species in genus Abebaia.
