= Magodendron =

Scientific classification
- Kingdom: Plantae
- Clade: Tracheophytes
- Clade: Angiosperms
- Clade: Eudicots
- Clade: Asterids
- Order: Ericales
- Family: Sapotaceae
- Subfamily: Chrysophylloideae
- Genus: Magodendron; Vink

Genus of plants

Magodendron is a genus of flowering plants belonging to the family Sapotaceae.

Its native range is New Guinea.

Species:

- Magodendron mennyae Vink
- Magodendron venefici (C.T.White & W.D.Francis) Vink
