= Nemaluma =

Scientific classification
- Kingdom: Plantae
- Clade: Tracheophytes
- Clade: Angiosperms
- Clade: Eudicots
- Clade: Asterids
- Order: Ericales
- Family: Sapotaceae
- Subfamily: Chrysophylloideae
- Genus: Nemaluma; Baill.

Genus of flowering plants

Nemaluma is a genus of flowering plants in the family Sapotaceae. It includes two species native to tropical South America, including Colombia, Venezuela, the Guianas, and northern Brazil.

- Nemaluma anomala (Pires) Swenson
- Nemaluma engleri (Eyma) Aubrév. & Pellegr.
