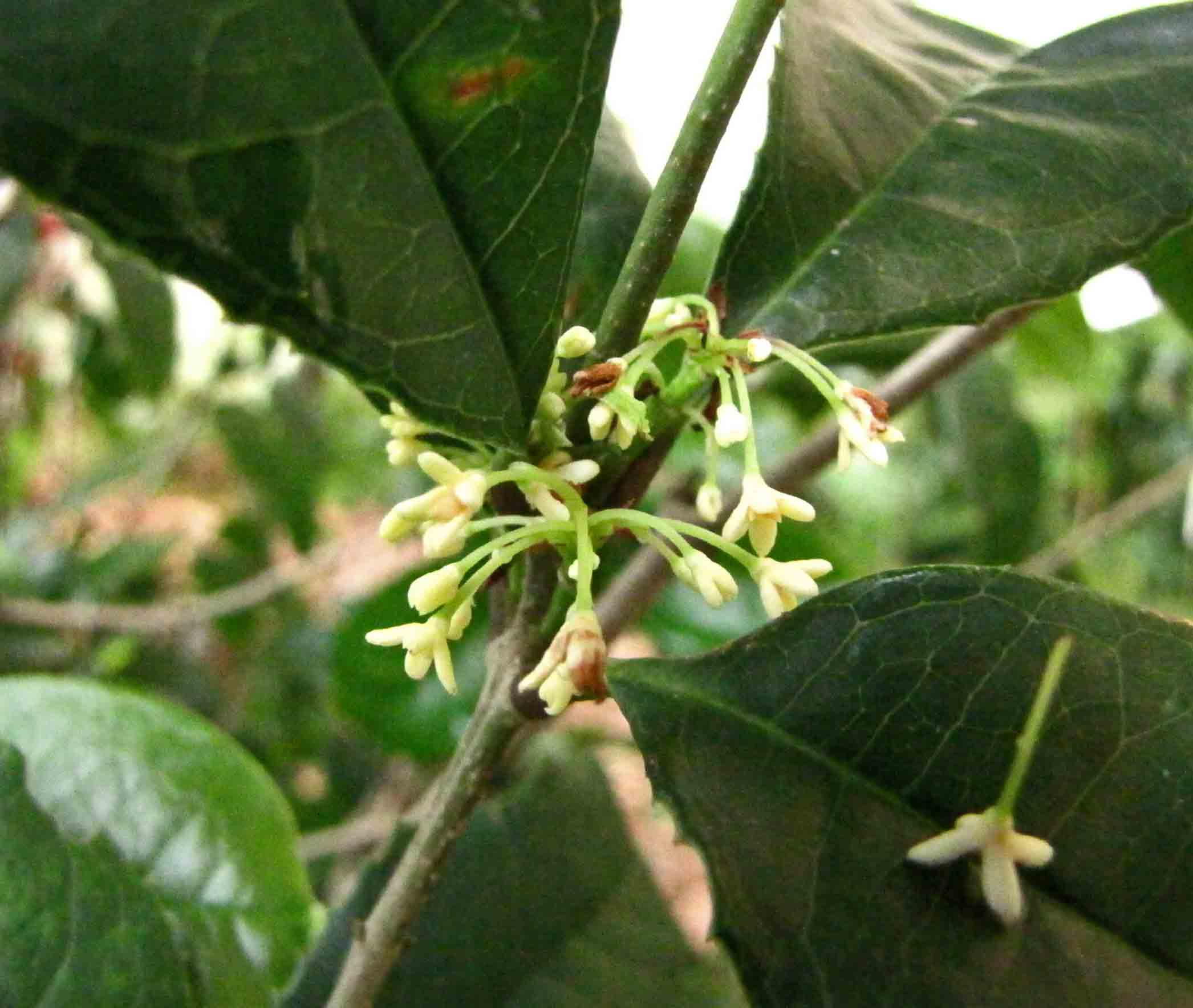
- Sarcosperma laurinum

Scientific classification
- Kingdom: Plantae
- Clade: Tracheophytes
- Clade: Angiosperms
- Clade: Eudicots
- Clade: Asterids
- Order: Ericales
- Family: Sapotaceae
- Subfamily: Sarcospermatoideae; Swenson & Anderb.
- Genus: Sarcosperma; Hook.f.

Synonyms
- Apoia Merr.; Bracea King; Peronia R.Br. ex Wall.

= Sarcosperma =

Genus of shrubs and trees

Sarcosperma is a genus of trees or shrubs in the family Sapotaceae. Their range is from India to southern China and Malesia.

== Description ==
The leaves are well-spaced along twigs. Flowers are bisexual, with a funnel-shaped corolla. Fruits are one or two-seeded. Sarcosperma habitats are forests from sea-level to about 1,300 metres (4,300 ft) elevation.

== Species ==
Accepted species

1. Sarcosperma affine Gagnep. - Vietnam
2. Sarcosperma angustifolium Gagnep. - Vietnam
3. Sarcosperma arboreum Hook.f. - S China, E Himalayas, NW Indochina
4. Sarcosperma griffithii Hook.f. ex C.B.Clarke - Yunnan, E Himalayas
5. Sarcosperma kachinense (King & Pantl.) Exell - S China, Assam, N Indochina
6. Sarcosperma kontumense Gagnep. ex Aubrév. - Vietnam
7. Sarcosperma laurinum (Benth.) Hook.f. - Vietnam, S China
8. Sarcosperma ovatifolium Gagnep. - Vietnam
9. Sarcosperma paniculatum (King) Stapf & King - Malaysia, Indonesia, Philippines
10. Sarcosperma pedunculatum Hemsl. - Yunnan, Hunnan, Vietnam
11. Sarcosperma uittienii H.J.Lam - Selangor, Sumatra
