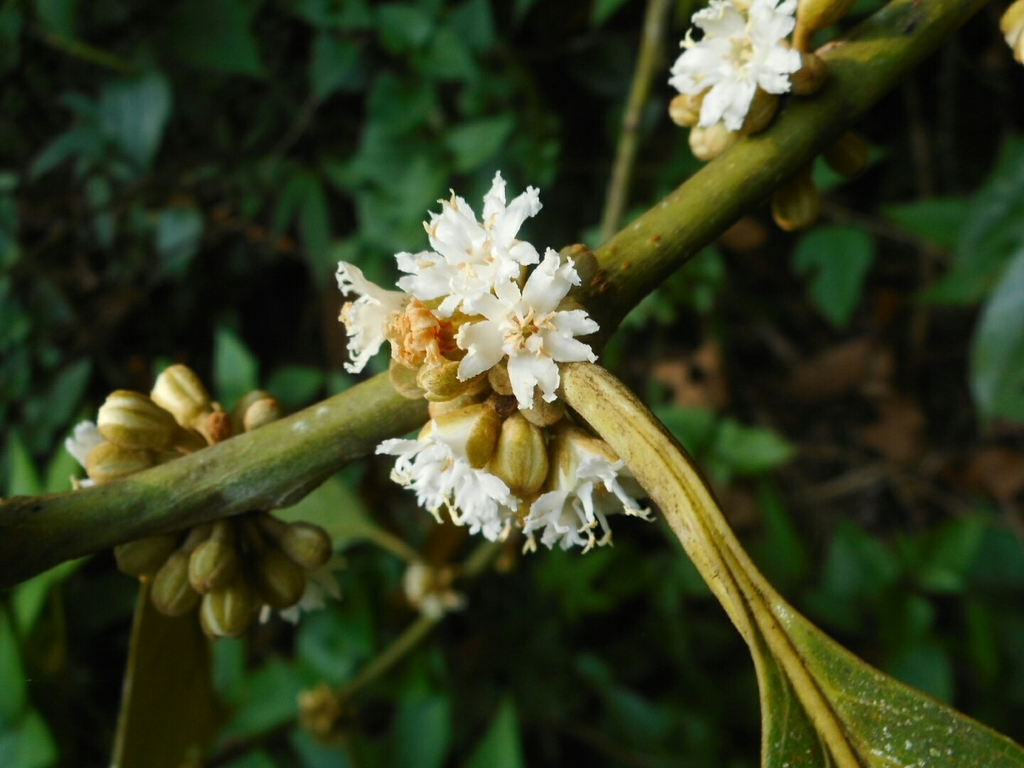

Scientific classification
- Kingdom: Plantae
- Clade: Embryophytes
- Clade: Tracheophytes
- Clade: Spermatophytes
- Clade: Angiosperms
- Clade: Eudicots
- Clade: Asterids
- Order: Ericales
- Family: Sapotaceae
- Genus: Eberhardtia; Lecomte

= Eberhardtia =

Genus of flowering plants

Eberhardtia is a genus of plant in the Sapotaceae described as a genus in 1920. It is native to Laos, Vietnam, and southern China.

species

- Eberhardtia aurata (Pierre ex Dubard) Lecomte - China (Guangdong, Guangxi, Yunnan), Vietnam
- Eberhardtia krempfii Lecomte - Vietnam, Laos
- Eberhardtia tonkinensis Lecomte - China (Yunnan), Laos, Vietnam
