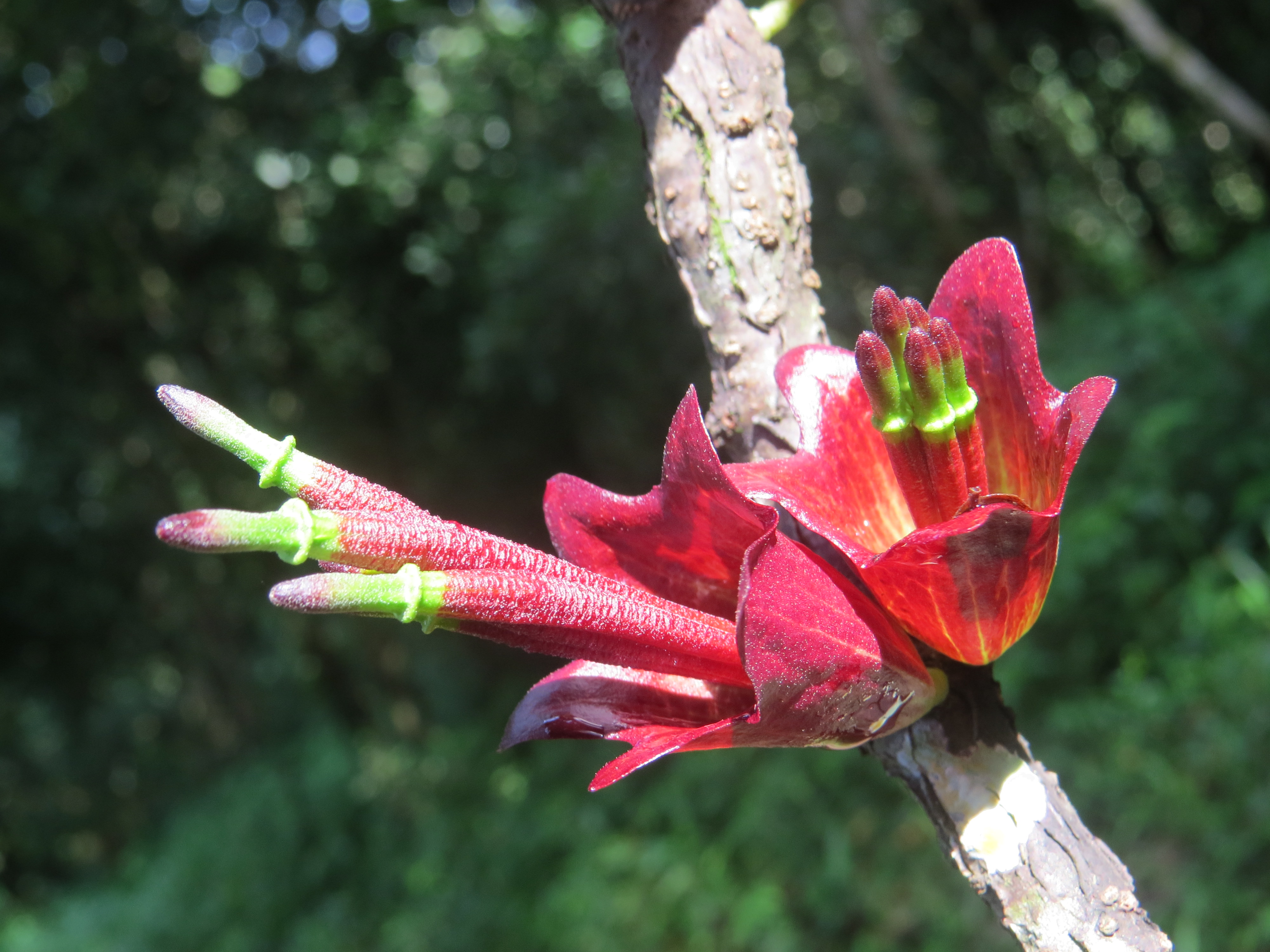
- Tolypanthus lagenifer from Aralam WLS

Scientific classification
- Kingdom: Plantae
- Clade: Tracheophytes
- Clade: Angiosperms
- Clade: Eudicots
- Order: Santalales
- Family: Loranthaceae
- Subtribe: Dendrophthoinae
- Genus: Tolypanthus (Blume) Rchb.

Species
- See text

= Tolypanthus =

Genus of mistletoes

Tolypanthus is a genus of plants in the family Loranthaceae.

Species include:

- Tolypanthus esquirolii (H.Lév.) Lauener
- Tolypanthus gardneri (Thwaites) Tiegh.
- Tolypanthus involucratus (Roxb.) Tiegh.
- Tolypanthus lagenifer (Wight ex J.Graham) Tiegh.
- Tolypanthus lunatus Rajasek.
- Tolypanthus maclurei (Merr.) Danser
- Tolypanthus pustulatus Barlow
