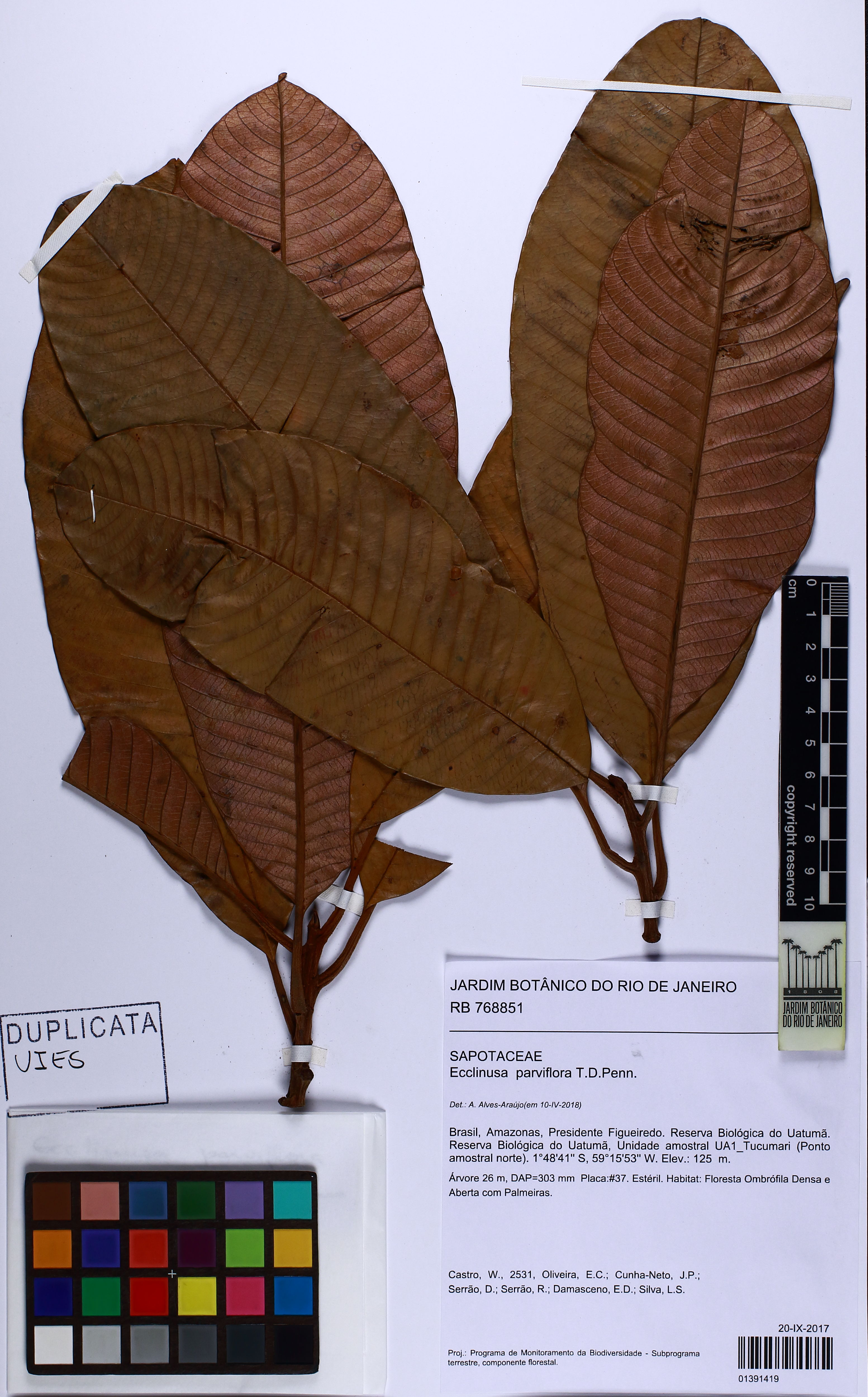

Scientific classification
- Kingdom: Plantae
- Clade: Tracheophytes
- Clade: Angiosperms
- Clade: Eudicots
- Clade: Asterids
- Order: Ericales
- Family: Sapotaceae
- Subfamily: Chrysophylloideae
- Genus: Ecclinusa; Mart.

Synonyms
- Ecclimusa Mart. ex A.DC.; Passaveria Mart. & Eichler

= Ecclinusa =

Genus of flowering plants

Ecclinusa is a genus of plants in the family Sapotaceae described as a genus in 1839.

Ecclinusa is native to Panama and tropical South America.

== Species ==
12 species are accepted.

1. Ecclinusa atabapoensis (Aubrév.) T.D.Penn — Colombia, Venezuela (Amazonas)
2. Ecclinusa bullata T.D.Penn. — Venezuela (Amazonas), Brazil (Amazonas)
3. Ecclinusa campinae Terra-Araujo & F.M.Costa – Brazil (Amazonas)
4. Ecclinusa dumetorum (Baehni) T.D.Penn. — Tafelberg
5. Ecclinusa guianensis Eyma — northern South America, possibly Panama
6. Ecclinusa lanceolata (Mart. & Eichler) Pierre — northern South America, Panama
7. Ecclinusa lancifolia (Mart. & Eichler) Eyma — Brazil (Amazonas)
8. Ecclinusa orinocoensis Aubrév. — Venezuela (Amazonas)
9. Ecclinusa parviflora T.D.Penn. — Venezuela (Amazonas)
10. Ecclinusa psilophylla Sandwith — Suriname, Guyana
11. Ecclinusa ramiflora Mart — French Guiana, Suriname, Venezuela, Colombia, Ecuador, Peru, Bolivia, Brazil
12. Ecclinusa ulei (K.Krause) Gilly ex Cronquist —Venezuela (Amazonas, Bolívar)
