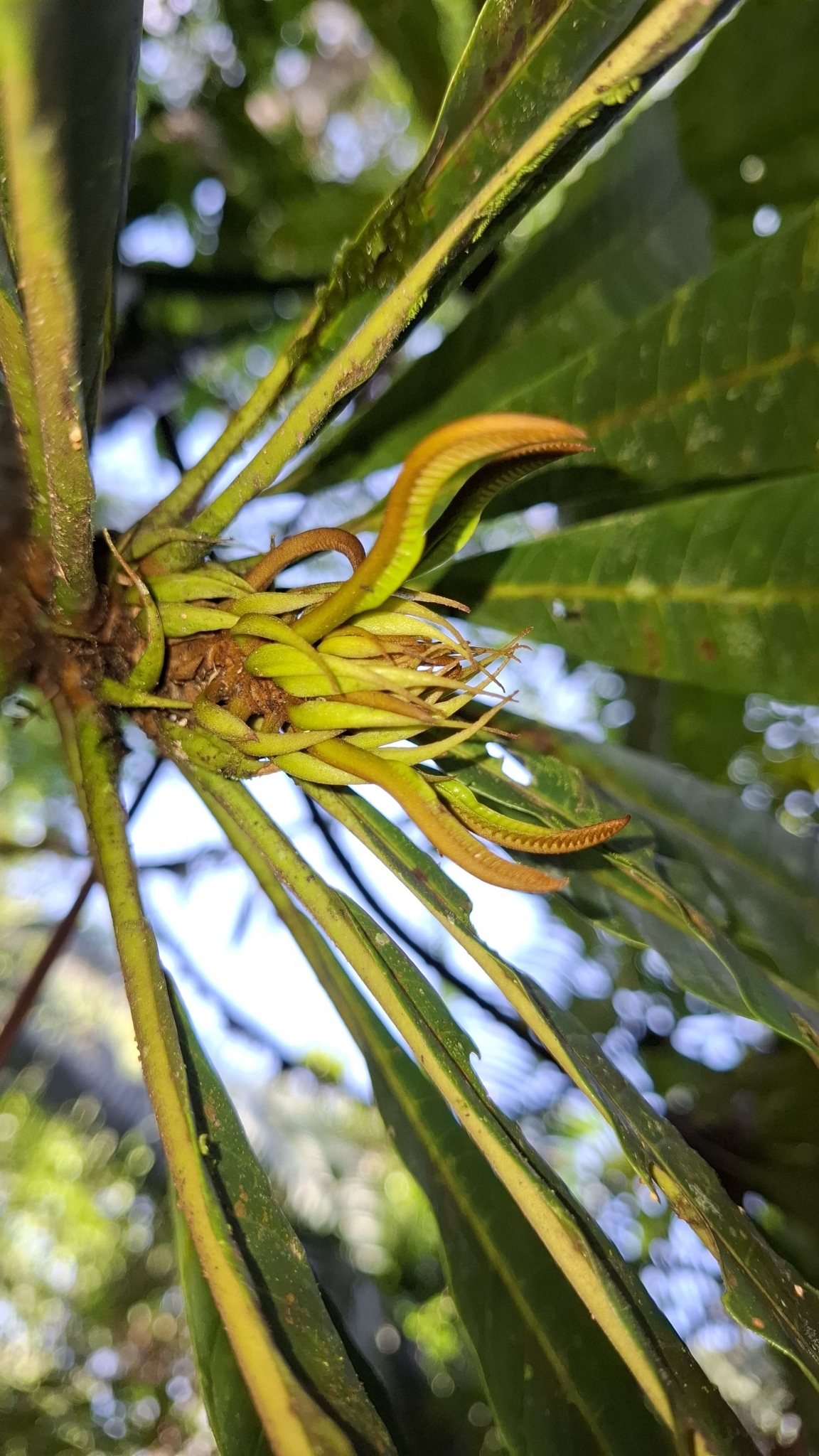
- Chromolucuma cespedesiiformis

Scientific classification
- Kingdom: Plantae
- Clade: Embryophytes
- Clade: Tracheophytes
- Clade: Spermatophytes
- Clade: Angiosperms
- Clade: Eudicots
- Clade: Asterids
- Order: Ericales
- Family: Sapotaceae
- Subfamily: Chrysophylloideae
- Genus: Chromolucuma; Ducke

Type species
- Chromolucuma rubriflora Ducke

= Chromolucuma =

Genus of flowering plants

Chromolucuma is a genus of plants in the family Sapotaceae described in 1925.

The genus is native to Central and South America.

== Species ==
Nine species are accepted.

- Chromolucuma apiculata Alves-Araújo & M.Alves – Brazil (Bahia)
- Chromolucuma baehniana Monach – Venezuela (Amazonas), Guyana
- Chromolucuma brevipedicellata C.C.Vasconc. & Terra-Araujo – Brazil (Amazonas)
- Chromolucuma cespedesiiformis J.F.Morales – Costa Rica
- Chromolucuma congestifolia (Pilz) Alves-Araújo & M.Alves – Panama, Costa Rica
- Chromolucuma flavilatex (T.D.Penn.) Alves-Araújo – French Guiana and northern Brazil (Amazonas)
- Chromolucuma rubriflora Ducke – Colombia (Antioquia), S Venezuela (Amazonas), Brazil (Amazonas, Roraima, Pará)
- Chromolucuma stipulifera (T.D.Penn.) Alves-Araújo – French Guiana and northern Brazil (Amazonas)
- Chromolucuma williamii (Aubrév. & Pellegr.) Alves-Araújo – Colombia (Amazonas), northern Brazil (Amazonas), and French Guiana
