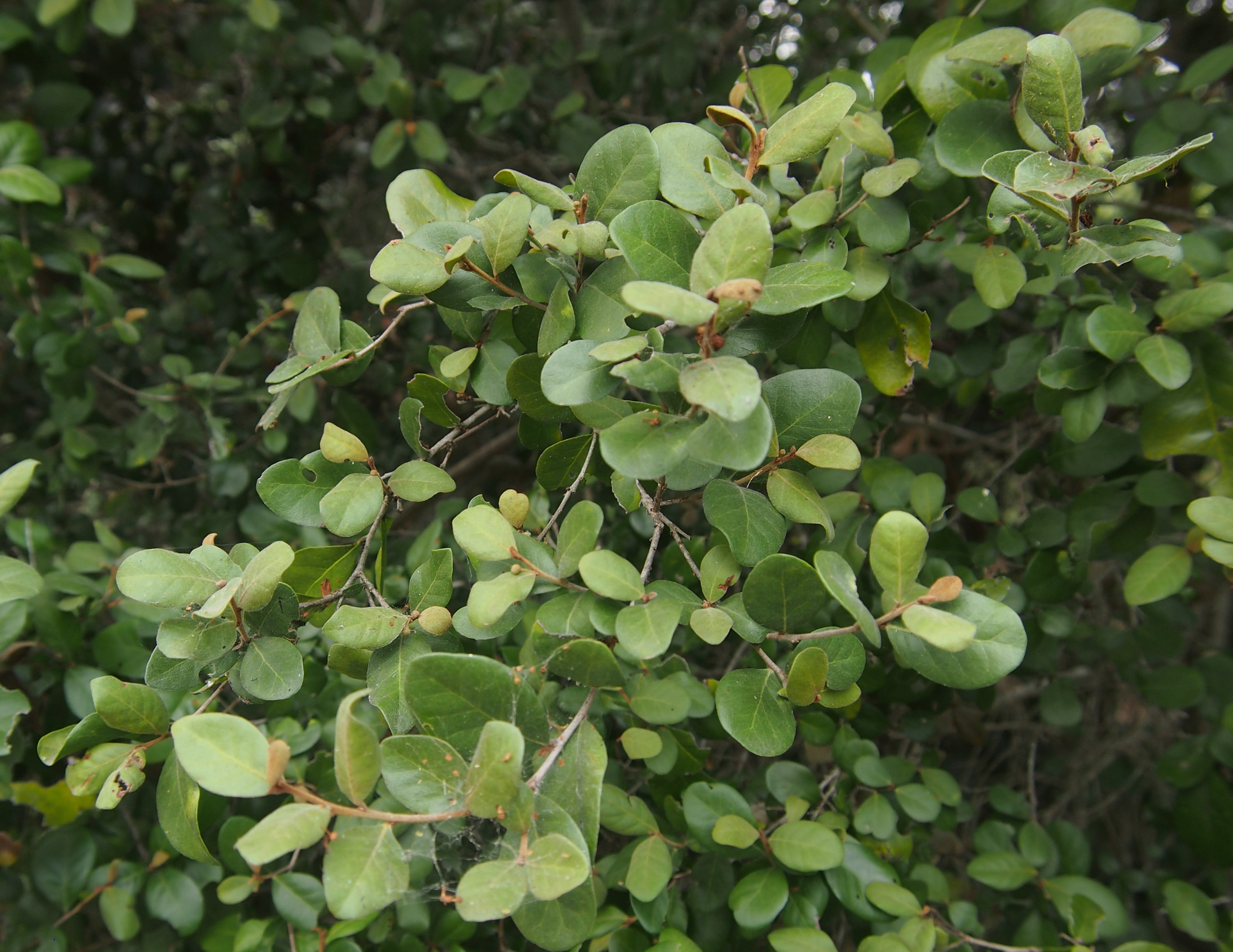
- Sersalisia sericea

Scientific classification
- Kingdom: Plantae
- Clade: Tracheophytes
- Clade: Angiosperms
- Clade: Eudicots
- Clade: Asterids
- Order: Ericales
- Family: Sapotaceae
- Subfamily: Chrysophylloideae
- Genus: Sersalisia; R.Br.

Type species
- Sersalisia sericea (Aiton) R.Br.

= Sersalisia =

Genus of trees

Sersalisia is a genus of trees in the family Sapotaceae described as a genus in 1810.

Past circumscriptions of the genus have included more species, several of which have now been transferred to other genera. Recent phylogenetic and morphological studies support 5-7 species native to Australia, New Guinea, and Malesia. Plants of the World Online currently accepts five species.

== Species ==
5 species are currently accepted.

- Sersalisia luzoniensis (Merr.) Swenson – Borneo, Philippines, Sulawesi, Lesser Sunda Islands, and New Guinea
- Sersalisia obpyriformis (F.M.Bailey) Domin – northeastern Queensland
- Sersalisia sericea (Aiton) R.Br. - Queensland, Northern Territory, Western Australia
- Sersalisia sessiliflora (C.T.White) Aubrév. - northeastern Queensland
- Sersalisia unmackiana (F.M.Bailey) Domin – northern Queensland
