= Tridesmostemon =

Scientific classification
- Kingdom: Plantae
- Clade: Tracheophytes
- Clade: Angiosperms
- Clade: Eudicots
- Clade: Asterids
- Order: Ericales
- Family: Sapotaceae
- Subfamily: Chrysophylloideae
- Genus: Tridesmostemon; Engl.

Synonyms
- Nzidora A.Chev., name published without description

Genus of flowering plants

Tridesmostemon is a genus of the plant family Sapotaceae described as a genus in 1905.

Tridesmostemon is native to western and central Africa.

Species

1. Tridesmostemon congoensis (A.Chev.) Aubrév. & Pellegr - Gabon
2. Tridesmostemon omphalocarpoides Engl. - Nigeria, Cameroon, Gabon, Cabinda, Central African Rep., West Congo, East Congo
