= Spiniluma =

Scientific classification
- Kingdom: Plantae
- Clade: Tracheophytes
- Clade: Angiosperms
- Clade: Eudicots
- Clade: Asterids
- Order: Ericales
- Family: Sapotaceae
- Subfamily: Chrysophylloideae
- Genus: Spiniluma (Baill.) Aubrév.

Species
- See text

Genus of plants

Spiniluma is a genus of flowering plant in the family Sapotaceae. The genus is native to Eritrea, Ethiopia, Saudi Arabia, and Socotra.

== Species ==
As of March 2022, Plants of the World Online accepted two species:

- Spiniluma discolor (Radcl.-Sm.) Friis – Socotra (Hajhir Mountains)
- Spiniluma oxyacantha (Baill.) Aubrév. – Ethiopia, Eritrea, and southwestern Saudi Arabia
