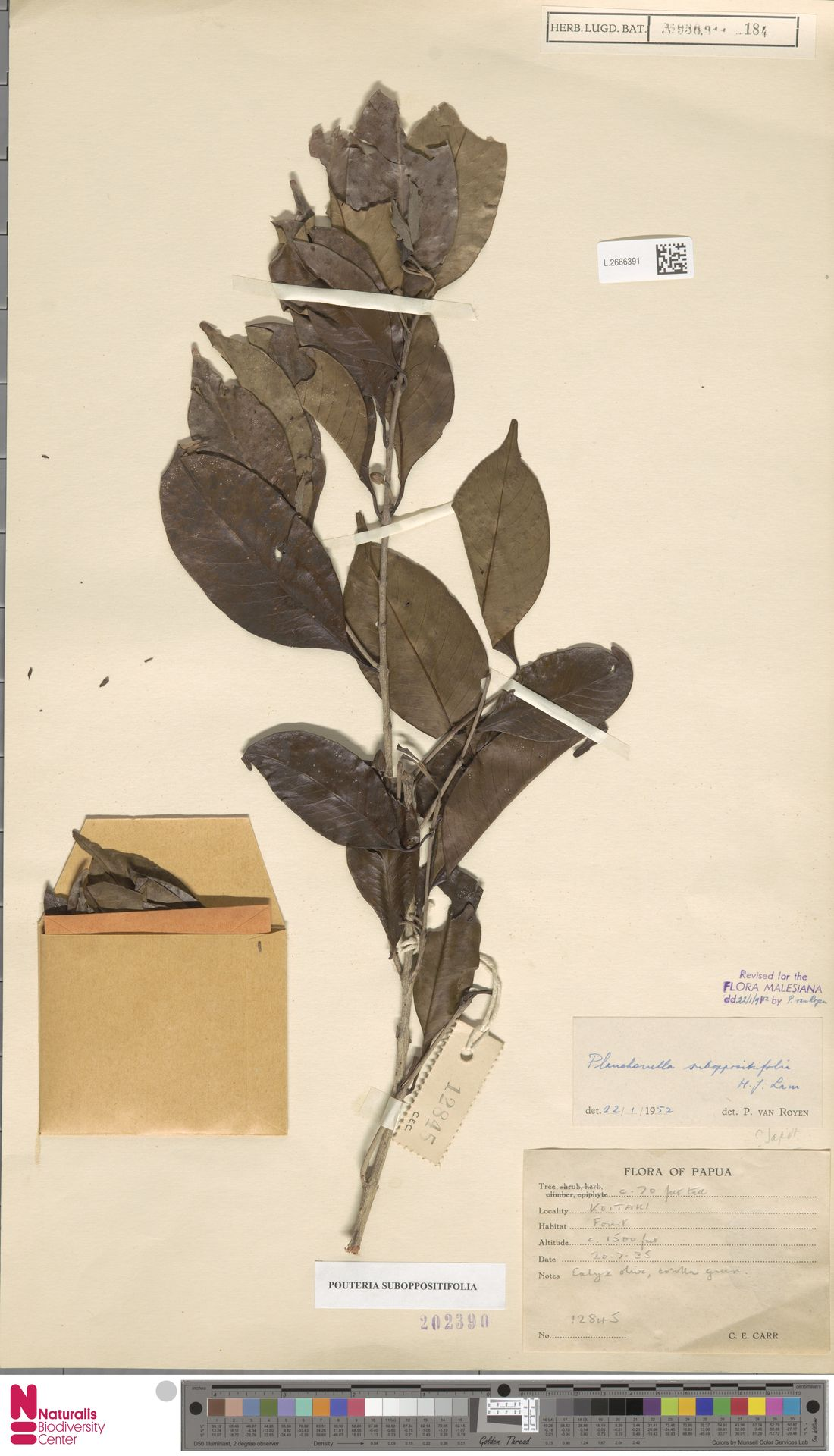

Conservation status
- Endangered (IUCN 3.1)

Scientific classification
- Kingdom: Plantae
- Clade: Tracheophytes
- Clade: Angiosperms
- Clade: Eudicots
- Clade: Asterids
- Order: Ericales
- Family: Sapotaceae
- Genus: Sahulia; Swenson (2020)
- Species: S. suboppositifolia

Binomial name
- Sahulia suboppositifolia (H.J.Lam) Swenson (2020)

Synonyms
- Planchonella suboppositifolia H.J.Lam (1932); Pouteria suboppositifolia (H.J.Lam) Baehni (1942)

= Sahulia =

Genus of plants

Sahulia suboppositifolia is species of flowering plant in the family Sapotaceae. It is a tree endemic to New Guinea. It is the sole species in genus Sahulia.

Sahulia suboppostifolia can grow up to 30 meters tall. It is evergreen, hermaphroditic, and latex-producing.

It is endemic to New Guinea and known only from near Lake Murray in Western Province of Papua New Guinea, and from Aroa and Koitaki (east of Port Moresby) in Central Province. It grows in lowland and hill tropical rain forest, from sea level to about 450 meters elevation.

The genus name Sahulia refers to the Sahul Shelf between New Guinea and Australia. Phylogenetically the genus is sister to Amorphospermum, Niemeyera, Pycnandra, and Planchonella.
