= Breviea =

Conservation status
- Near Threatened (IUCN 2.3)

Scientific classification
- Kingdom: Plantae
- Clade: Tracheophytes
- Clade: Angiosperms
- Clade: Eudicots
- Clade: Asterids
- Order: Ericales
- Family: Sapotaceae
- Subfamily: Chrysophylloideae
- Genus: Breviea; Aubrév. & Pellegr.
- Species: B. sericea

Binomial name
- Breviea sericea Aubrév. & Pellegr.

Synonyms
- Chrysophyllum sericeum A.Chev. 1917, illegitimate homonym, not A.DC. 1844 nor Salisb. 1796; Pouteria leptosperma Baehni; Chrysophyllum leptospermum (Baehni) Roberty; Breviea leptosperma (Baehni) Heine

Genus of flowering plants

Breviea is a genus of plant in the family Sapotaceae described in 1935.

It contains only one known species, Breviea sericea native to tropical Africa (Ghana, Ivory Coast, Central African Republic, Cameroon, Zaire).

The species is listed as near threatened.
