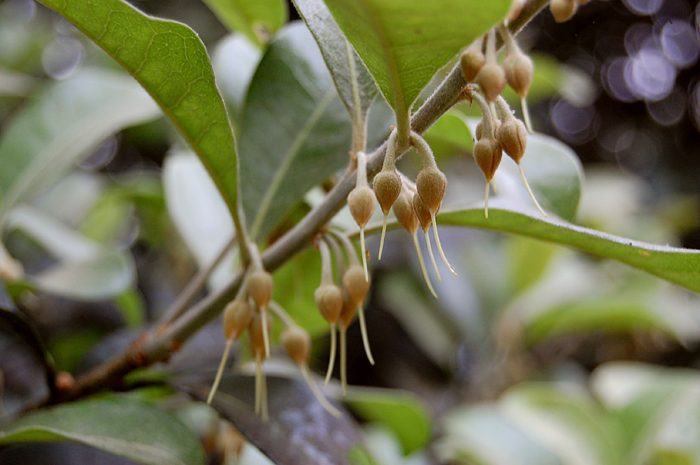
- Xantolis tomentosa

Scientific classification
- Kingdom: Plantae
- Clade: Tracheophytes
- Clade: Angiosperms
- Clade: Eudicots
- Clade: Asterids
- Order: Ericales
- Family: Sapotaceae
- Subfamily: Chrysophylloideae
- Genus: Xantolis; Raf.

= Xantolis =

Genus of flowering plants

Xantolis is a genus of trees and shrubs in the family Sapotaceae described as a genus in 1838.

Xantolis is native to Asia (India to southern China to Singapore and the Philippines.

Species

1. Xantolis assamica C.B.Clarke) P.Royen – Assam
2. Xantolis baranensis (Lecomte) P.Royen – Vietnam
3. Xantolis boniana (Dubard) P.Royen – Hainan, Laos, Vietnam
4. Xantolis burmanica (Collett & Hemsl.) P.Royen – Thailand, Myanmar
5. Xantolis cambodiana (Pierre ex Dubard) P.Royen – Cambodia, Laos, Thailand, Vietnam
6. Xantolis hookeri (C.B.Clarke) P.Royen – E Himalaya, Laos
7. Xantolis longispinosa (Merr.) H.S.Low – Hainan
8. Xantolis maritima (Pierre ex Dubard) P.Royen – Vietnam
9. Xantolis parvifolia (A.DC.) P.Royen – Luzon, Mindoro
10. Xantolis racemosa (Dubard) P.Royen – Vietnam
11. Xantolis shweliensis (W.W.Sm.) P.Royen – Yunnan
12. Xantolis siamensis (H.R.Fletcher) P.Royen – Thailand
13. Xantolis stenosepala (Hu) P.Royen – Yunnan
14. Xantolis tomentosa (Roxb.) Raf. – India, Sri Lanka, Thailand, Myanmar, Vietnam (syn. X. dongnaiensis)
