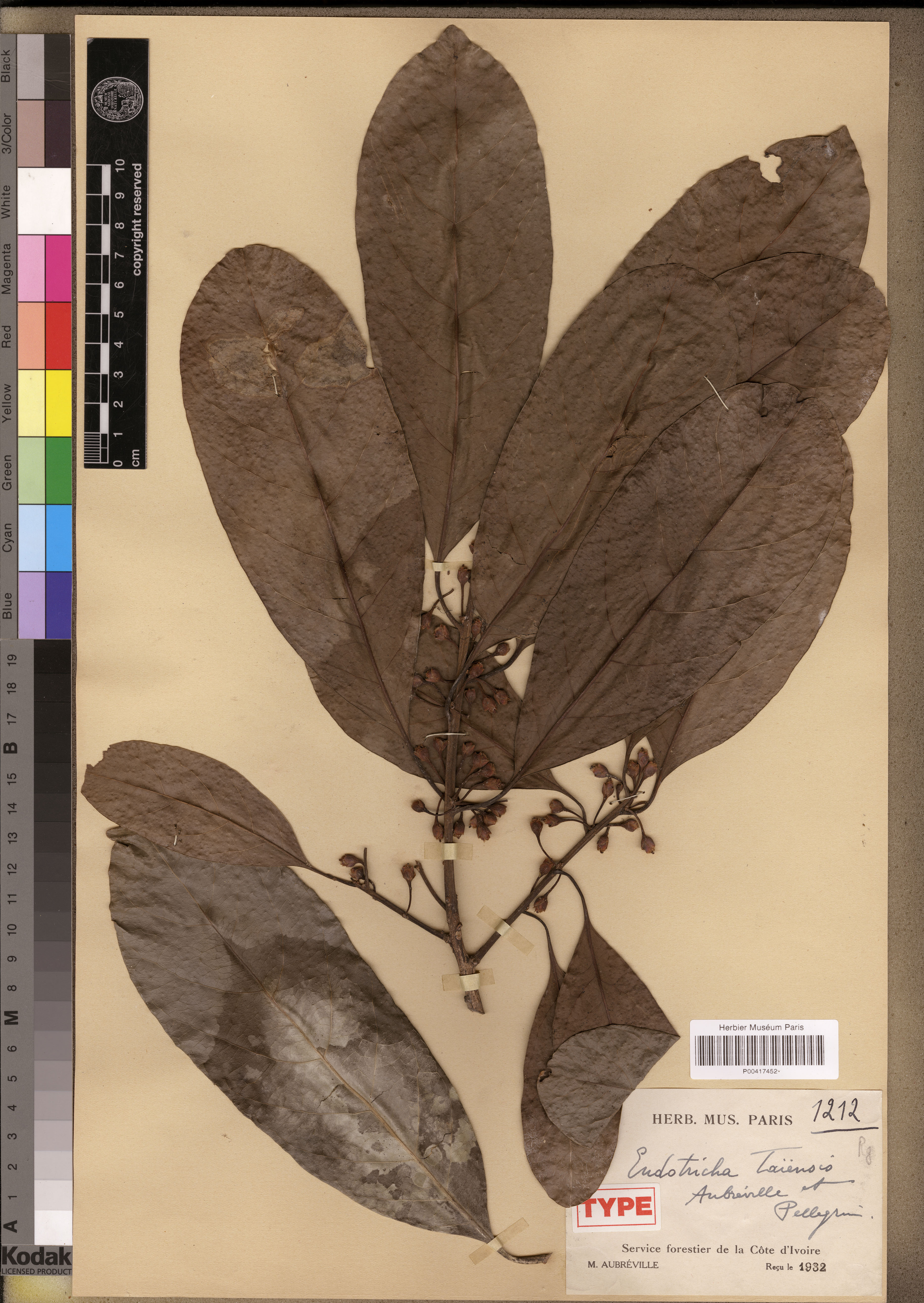

Conservation status
- Critically Endangered (IUCN 2.3)

Scientific classification
- Kingdom: Plantae
- Clade: Tracheophytes
- Clade: Angiosperms
- Clade: Eudicots
- Clade: Asterids
- Order: Ericales
- Family: Sapotaceae
- Genus: Aubregrinia; Heine, 1960
- Species: A. taiensis

Binomial name
- Aubregrinia taiensis (Aubrév. & Pellegr.) Heine

Synonyms
- Endotricha Aubrév. & Pellegr. 1935, illegitimate homonym, not Suringar 1870 (probably Gentianaceae); Endotricha taiensis Aubrév. & Pellegr.; Pouteria taiensis (Aubrév. & Pellegr.) Baehni

= Aubregrinia =

Genus of flowering plants

Aubregrinia is a genus of plant in the family Sapotaceae first described as a genus in 1935.

There is only one known species, Aubregrinia taiensis native to West Africa (Ghana, Liberia, Ivory Coast).

The genus name of Aubregrinia is in honour of both André Aubréville and François Pellegrin (Aubréville, Pellegrin).

The species is listed as critically endangered.
