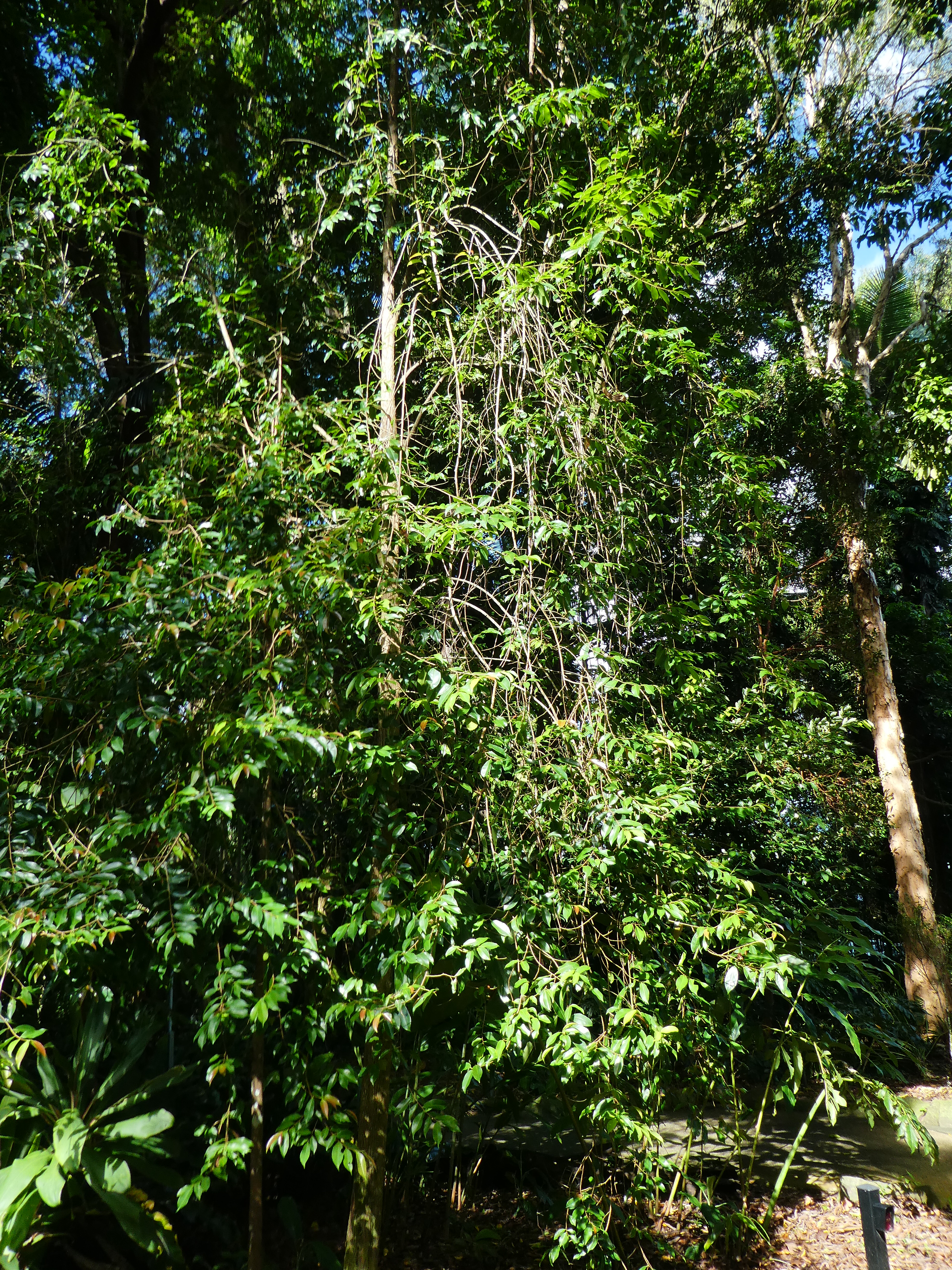
- At Cairns Botanic Gardens

Conservation status
- Least Concern (IUCN 3.1)

Scientific classification
- Kingdom: Plantae
- Clade: Tracheophytes
- Clade: Angiosperms
- Clade: Eudicots
- Clade: Asterids
- Order: Ericales
- Family: Sapotaceae
- Subfamily: Chrysophylloideae
- Genus: Van-royena; Aubrév.
- Species: V. castanosperma

Binomial name
- Van-royena castanosperma (C.T.White) Aubrév.

Synonyms
- Chrysophyllum castanospermum C.T.White; Lucuma castanosperma (C.T.White) C.T.White & W.D.Francis; Pouteria castanosperma (C.T.White) Baehni

= Van-royena =

Milky plum

Genus of flowering plants

Van-royena is a monotypic genus (a genus that contains only one species) in the plant family Sapotaceae. The sole species is Van-royena castanosperma, commonly known as milky plum, yellow plum, saffron boxwood or poison plum, which is endemic to Queensland, Australia. It is an understorey tree of rainforest, first described in 1919.

== Description ==
Van-royena castanosperma is an evergreen shrub or small tree up to 15 m (49 ft) tall. The twigs are lenticellate and glabrous (hairless), except for new growth which is finely hairy. The leaves are simple and arranged spirally on the twigs. They measure up to 12 cm (4.7 in) long by 5 cm (2.0 in) wide, and may be oblanceolate, lanceolate or elliptic. The petiole (leaf stalk) is about 5 mm (0.2 in) long and produces a milky exudate (sap) when broken. They have up to 13 pairs of lateral veins either side of the midrib.

The inflorescence is a small fascicle. The flowers have 5 overlapping sepals about 6 mm (0.2 in) long, which have fine rusty brown hairs on both sides. The corolla tube (i.e. the structure formed by the fusing of the basal portions of the petals) is about 10–12 mm (0.4–0.5 in) long, with 5 broadly ovate lobes about 2 mm (0.08 in) long. The corolla is glabrous except for some fine hairs on the margins of the lobes. Stamens are attached low in the corolla tube — the filaments are about 1 mm (0.04 in) long, the anther about 2 mm (0.08 in). The ovary is about 5 mm (0.20 in) long and 3 mm (0.12 in) diameter with 5 locules, and is densely hairy. The style is about 10–15 mm (0.4–0.6 in) long.

The fruit is a drupe, blue/black when ripe, with the calyx persisting at the base and an extended point at the apex. They measure up to 6 cm (2.4 in) long and 4.5 cm (1.8 in) wide, and they contain 1–3 seeds up to 4 cm (1.6 in) long and 3 cm (1.2 in) wide.

== Taxonomy ==
This plant was first described as Chrysophyllum castanospermum in 1919 by Australian botanist Cyril Tenison White, based on a specimen he collected in the upper parts of the Johnstone River. The specimen had fruit but no flowers, so he was only able to describe some aspects of the flower interpreted from the fruit, stating "Corolla not seen". He was aware that his placement of the specimen in Chrysophyllum may have to be changed when "perfect flowers are available". In 1923, he and fellow Australian botanist William Douglas Francis published a new description after examining flowering specimens from the Atherton Tableland collected by G. Curry, and they transferred it to the genus Lucuma, giving it the new combination L. castanosperma.

The species was renamed again in 1942, when Swiss botanist Charles Baehni published a paper in the journal Candollea in which he gave it the new binomial Pouteria castanosperma.

Most recently, in 1963, French botanist André Aubréville created the new genus Van-royena for the plant, implying some unique characteristics of the species. This move is supported by later research, and it has been suggested that the species may be the result of intergeneric cross-pollination.

=== Etymology ===
The genus name Van-royena is in honour of Pieter van Royen (1923–2002), a Dutch botanist. He was an author of many papers on the flora of New Guinea. The species epithet castanosperma is derived from Castanea, the chestnut genus, and the Latin word sperma (seed), a reference to the similar appearance of the seeds of this species to the chestnut.

== Distribution and habitat ==
This species is restricted to the Wet Tropics bioregion of Queensland, and occurs in coastal and sub-coastal areas from about 40 km (25 mi) north of Cooktown to the area around Tully. It inhabits well-developed rainforest at altitudes from sea level to about 1,200 m (3,900 ft).

== Conservation ==
As of December 2024, this species has been assessed to be of least concern by the International Union for Conservation of Nature (IUCN), and under the Queensland Government's Nature Conservation Act.

== Gallery ==
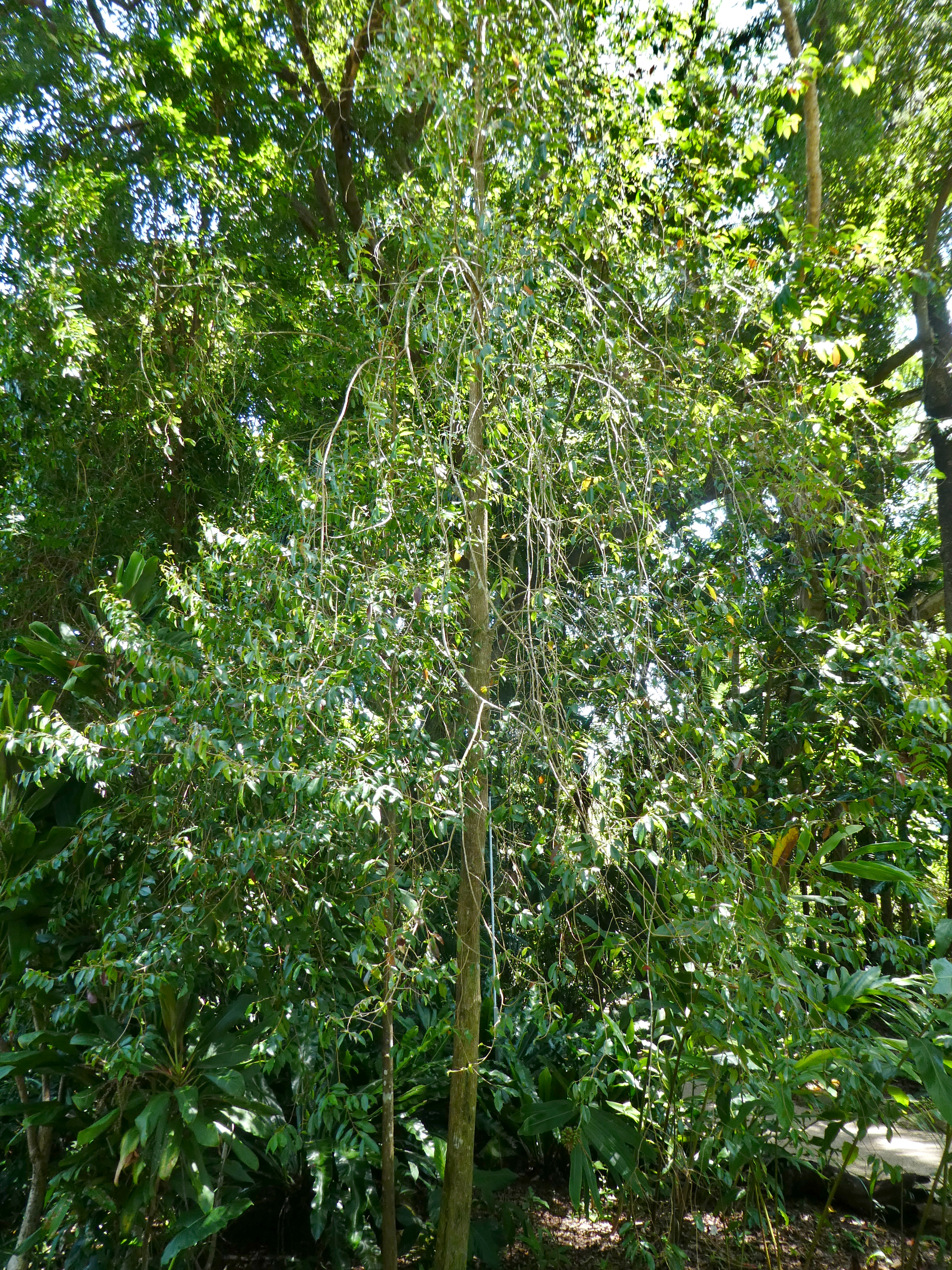
Habit

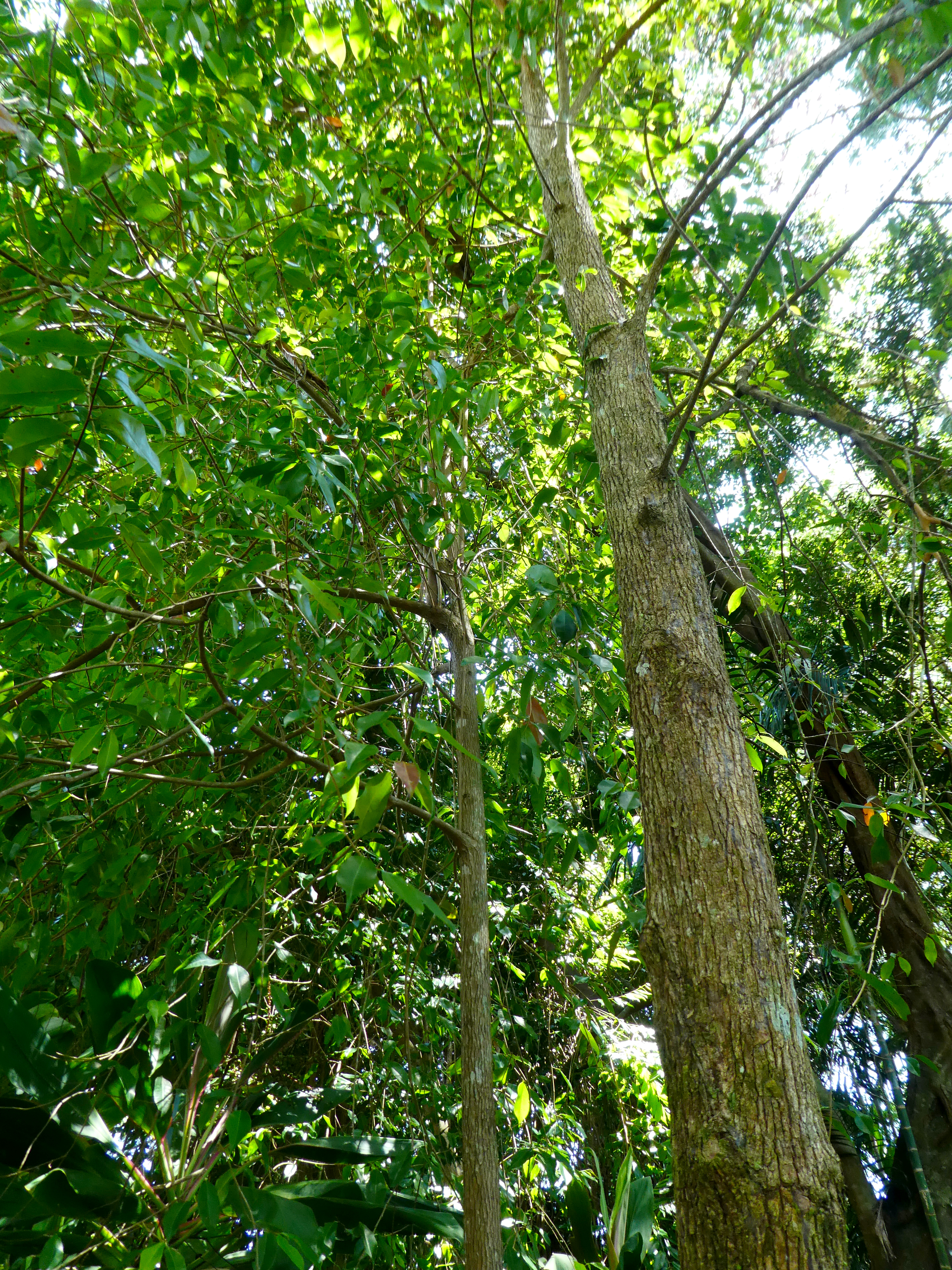
Trunk and branches

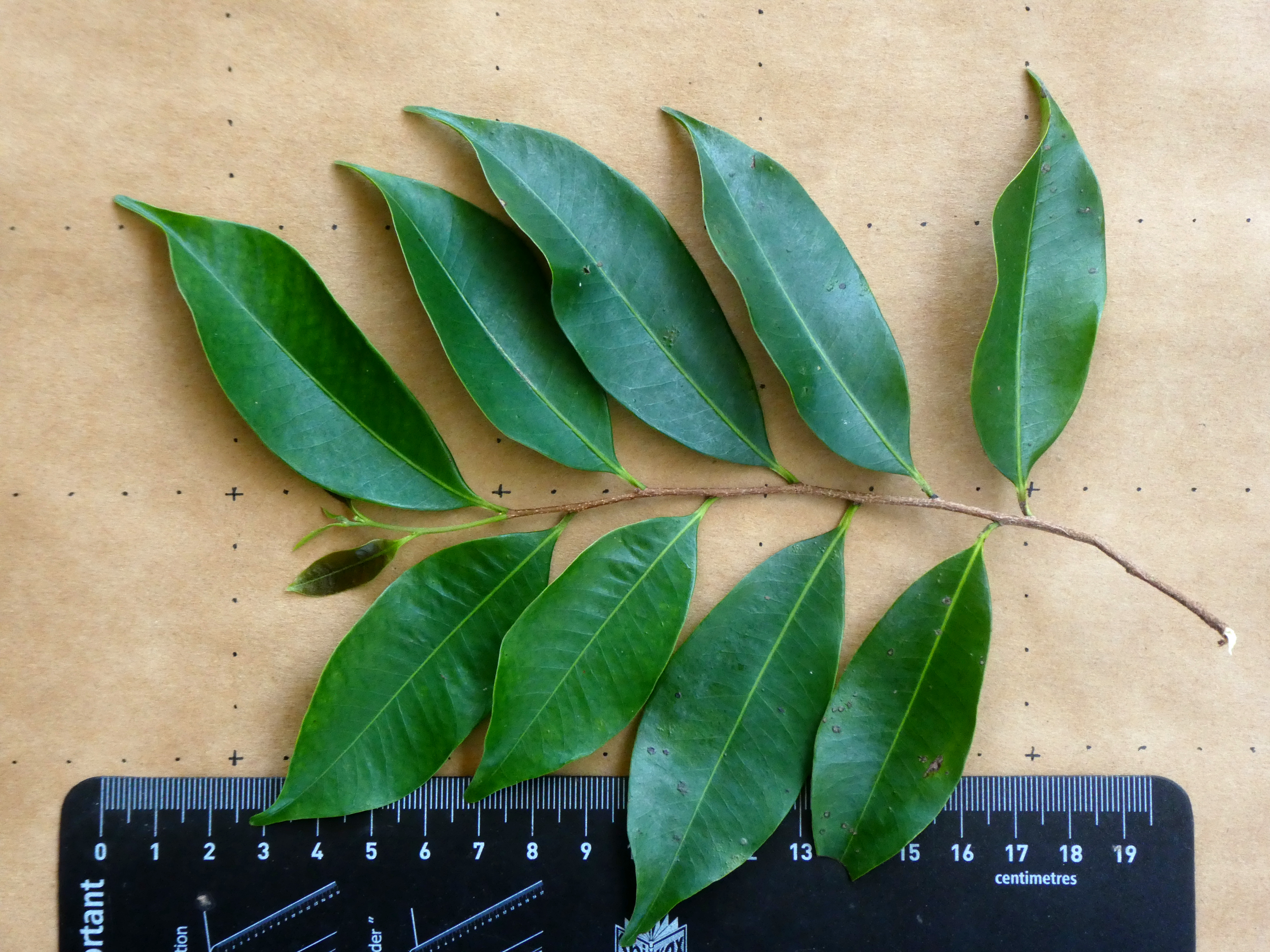
Leaves
