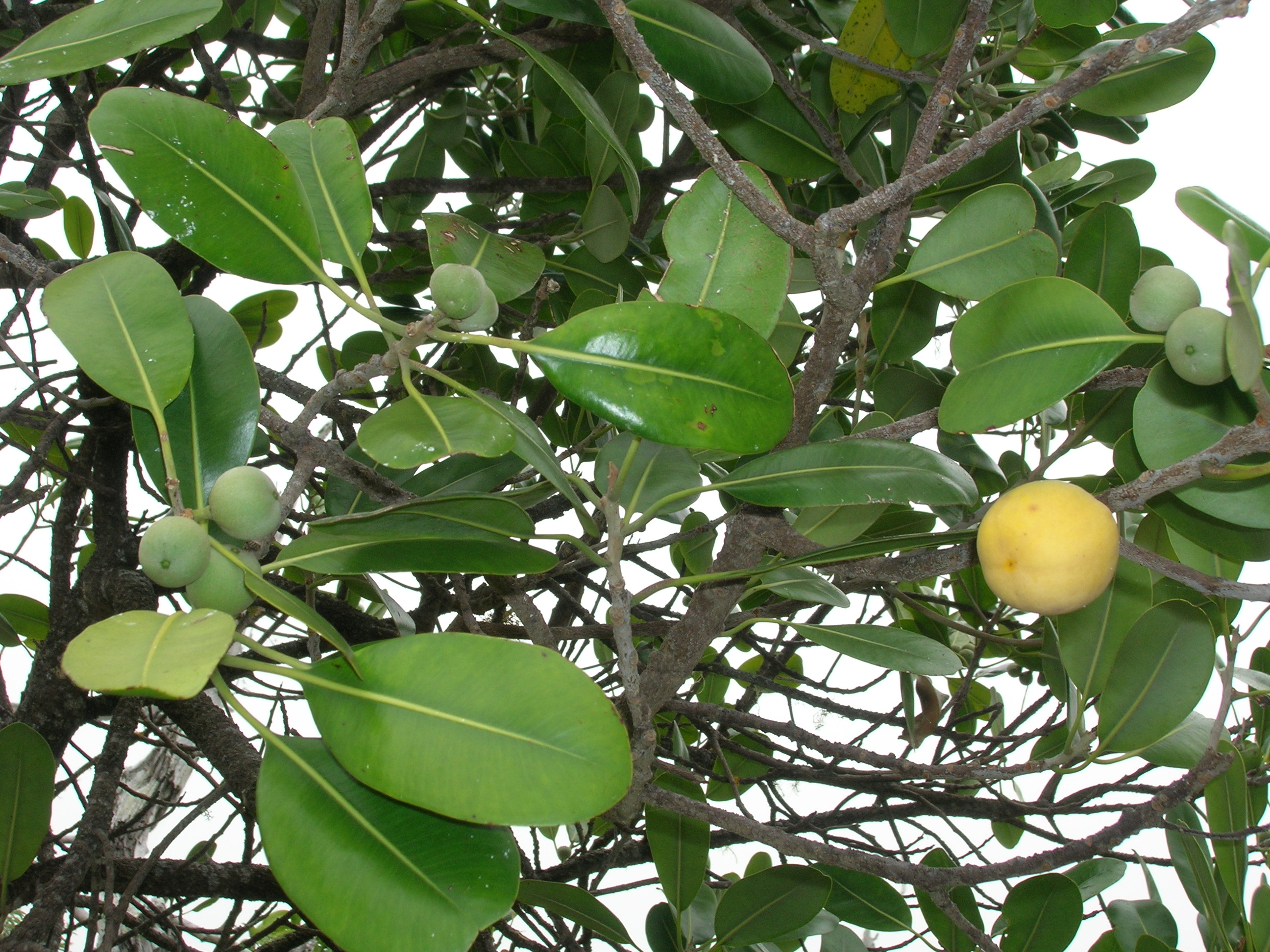
- Planchonella sandwicensis

Scientific classification
- Kingdom: Plantae
- Clade: Tracheophytes
- Clade: Angiosperms
- Clade: Eudicots
- Clade: Asterids
- Order: Ericales
- Family: Sapotaceae
- Subfamily: Chrysophylloideae; Luersson

Type genus
- Chrysophyllum L.

Genera
- See text

= Chrysophylloideae =

Subfamily of flowering plants

Chrysophylloideae is a subfamily of flowering plants in the chicle family, Sapotaceae.

== Genera ==
Genera accepted by the Germplasm Resources Information Network as of December 2022:

- Achrouteria Eyma
- Amorphospermum F.Muell.
- Aubregrinia Heine
- Beccariella Pierre
- Breviea Aubrév. & Pellegr.
- Chromolucuma Ducke
- Chrysophyllum L.
- Cornuella Pierre
- Delpydora Pierre
- Diploon Cronquist
- Donella Pierre ex Baill.
- Ecclinusa Mart.
- Elaeoluma Baill.
- Englerophytum K.Krause
- Gambeya Pierre
- Leptostylis Benth.
- Lucuma Molina
- Magodendron Vink
- Martiusella Pierre
- Micropholis (Griseb.) Pierre
- Nemaluma Baill.
- Niemeyera F.Muell.
- Omphalocarpum P.Beauv.
- Pichonia Pierre
- Planchonella Pierre
- Pleioluma Baill.
- Pouteria Aubl.
- Pradosia Liais
- Pycnandra Benth.
- Sahulia Swenson
- Sarcaulus Radlk.
- Sersalisia R.Br.
- Spiniluma (Baill.) Aubrév.
- Synsepalum (A.DC.) Daniell
- Tridesmostemon Engl.
- Van-royena Aubrév.
- Xantolis Raf.
