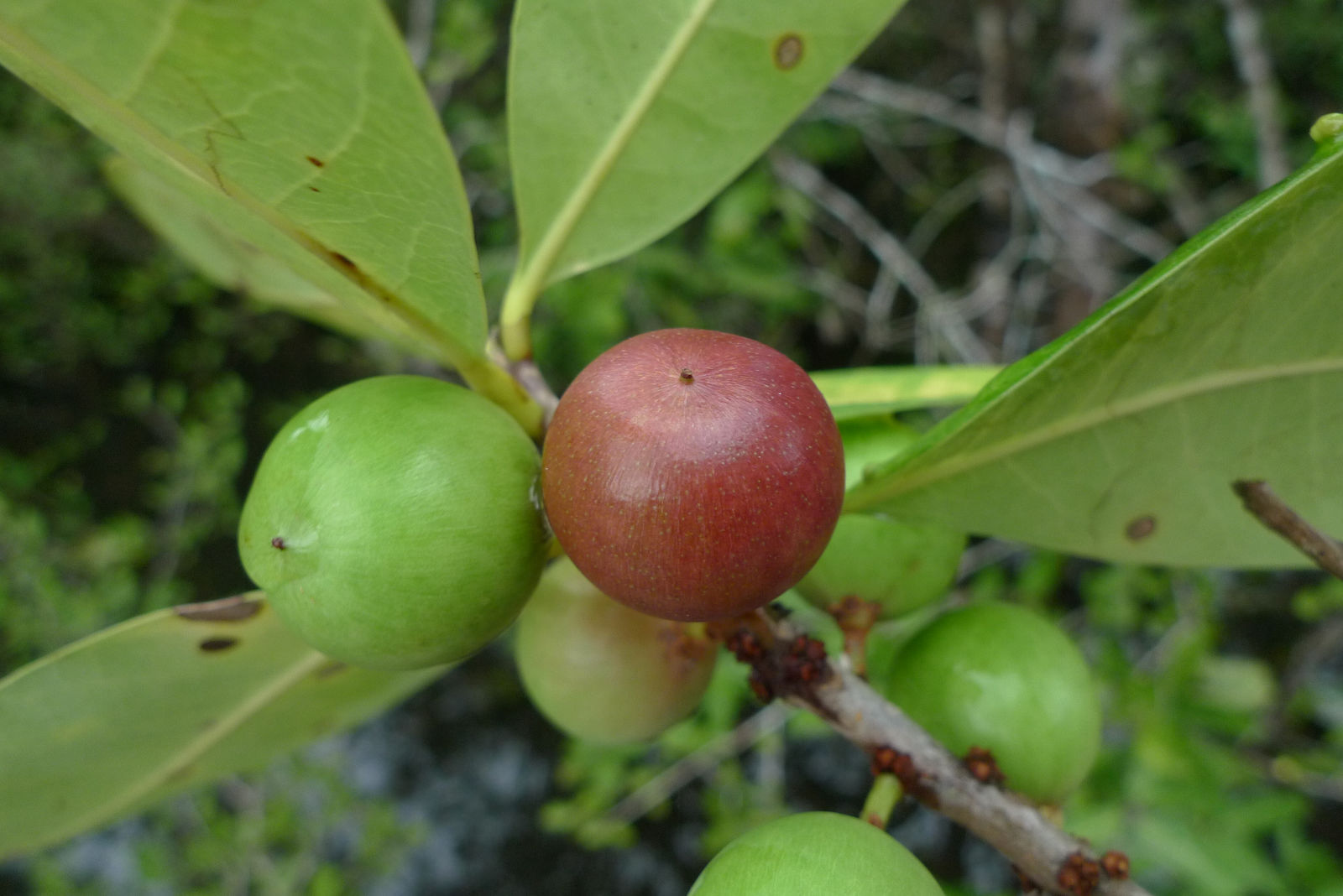
- Elaeoluma glabrescens with fruit

Scientific classification
- Kingdom: Plantae
- Clade: Embryophytes
- Clade: Tracheophytes
- Clade: Spermatophytes
- Clade: Angiosperms
- Clade: Eudicots
- Clade: Asterids
- Order: Ericales
- Family: Sapotaceae
- Subfamily: Chrysophylloideae
- Genus: Elaeoluma; Baill.

Synonyms
- Gymnoluma Baill.

= Elaeoluma =

Genus of flowering plants

Elaeoluma is a genus of plants in the family Sapotaceae described as a genus in 1891.

Elaeoluma is native to Central and South America.

== Species ==
Five species are accepted.

- Elaeoluma crispa T.D.Penn - Venezuela (Amazonas)
- Elaeoluma ferruginea Alves-Araújo – Venezuela
- Elaeoluma glabrescens (Mart. & Eichler) Aubrév. - Costa Rica, Panama, Colombia, Venezuela, Guyana, Peru, Bolivia, Brazil
- Elaeoluma nuda (Baehni) Aubrév. - Suriname, Venezuela, N Brazil
- Elaeoluma schomburgkiana (Miq.) Baill. - Guyana, S Venezuela, N Brazil
