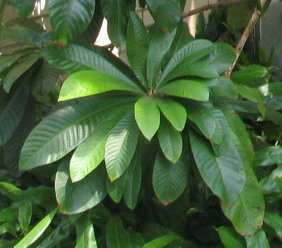

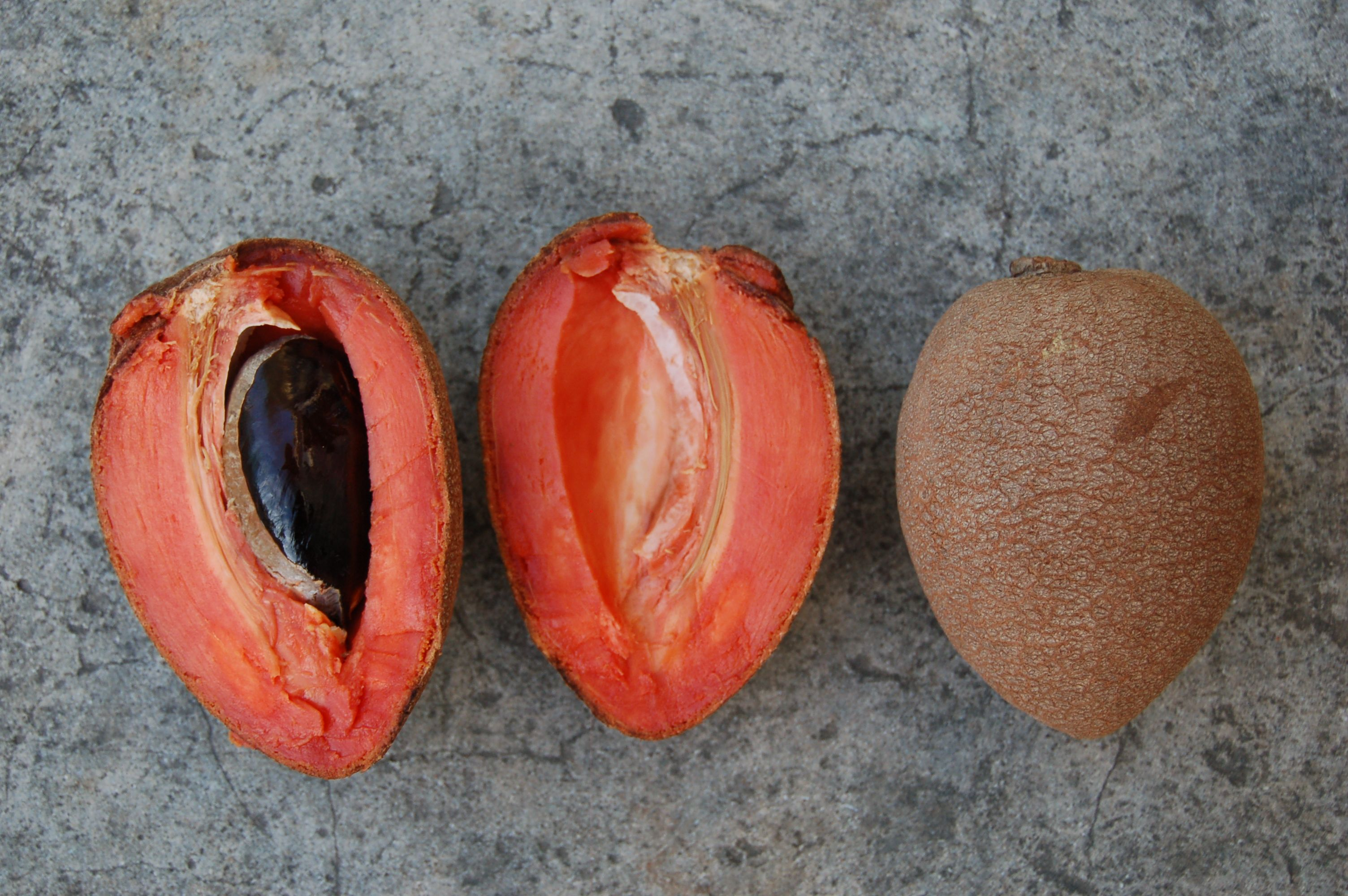
- Foliage and fruit (a berry containing one seed) of Pouteria sapota

Scientific classification
- Kingdom: Plantae
- Clade: Embryophytes
- Clade: Tracheophytes
- Clade: Spermatophytes
- Clade: Angiosperms
- Clade: Eudicots
- Clade: Asterids
- Order: Ericales
- Family: Sapotaceae; Juss.

Type genus
- Manilkara Adans.

Subfamilies
- Chrysophylloideae; Sapotoideae; Sarcospermatoideae

= Sapotaceae =

Family of flowering plants

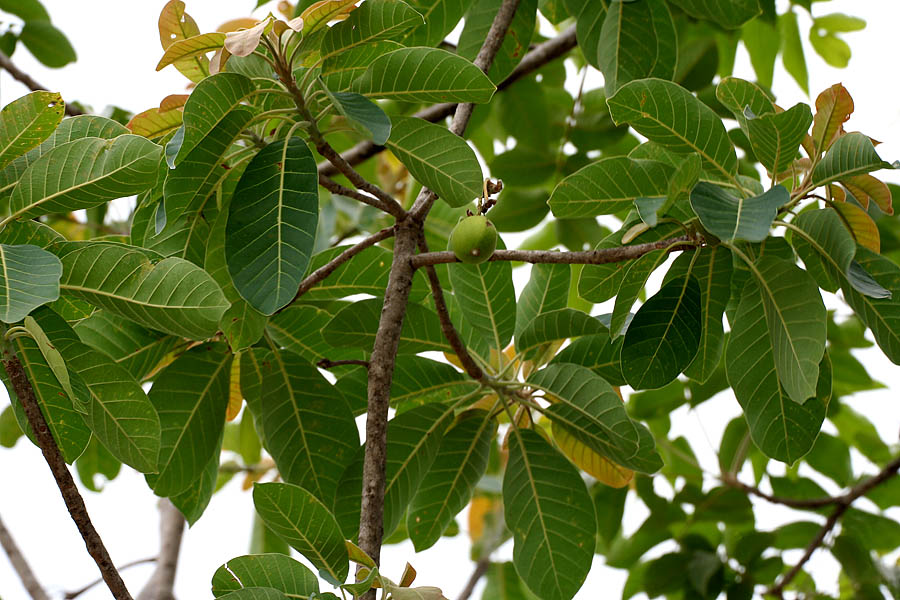
Madhuca longifolia var. latifolia in Narsapur, Medak district, India

The Sapotaceae are a family of flowering plants belonging to the order Ericales. The family includes approximately 800 species of evergreen trees and shrubs in about 65 genera (35–75, depending on generic definition). Their distribution is pantropical.

Many species produce edible fruits, or white blood-sap that is used to cleanse dirt, organically and manually, while others have other economic uses. Species noted for their edible fruits include Manilkara (sapodilla), Chrysophyllum cainito (star-apple or golden leaf tree), Gambeya africana and Gambeya albida (star-apple), and Pouteria (abiu, mamey sapote). Vitellaria paradoxa (shi in several languages of West Africa and karité in French; also anglicized as shea) is also the source of an oil-rich nut, the source of edible shea butter, which is the major lipid source for many African ethnic groups and is also used in traditional and Western cosmetics and medications. The "miracle fruit" Synsepalum dulcificum is also placed in the Sapotaceae.

Trees of the genus Palaquium (gutta-percha) produce an important latex with a wide variety of uses. The seeds of the tree Sideroxylon spinosum produce an edible oil, traditionally harvested in Morocco.

The family name is derived from zapote, a Mexican vernacular name for one of the plants (in turn derived from the Nahuatl tzapotl) and Latinised by Linnaeus as sapota, a name now treated as a synonym of Manilkara (also formerly known by the invalid name Achras).

== Genera ==
73 genera are currently accepted:

- Abebaia Baehni
- Achrouteria Eyma
- Amorphospermum F.Muell.
- Aningeria Aubrév. & Pellegr.
- Aubregrinia Heine
- Autranella A.Chev.
- Baillonella Pierre
- Bemangidia L.Gaut.
- Breviea Aubrév. & Pellegr.
- Burckella Pierre
- Capurodendron Aubrév.
- Chloroluma Baill.
- Chromolucuma Ducke
- Chrysophyllum L.
- Cornuella Pierre
- Delpydora Pierre
- Diploknema Pierre
- Diploon Cronquist
- Donella Pierre ex Baill.
- Eberhardtia Lecomte
- Ecclinusa Mart.
- Elaeoluma Baill.
- Englerella Pierre
- Englerophytum K.Krause
- Gambeya Pierre
- Gayella Pierre
- Gluema Aubrév. & Pellegr.
- Inhambanella Dubard
- Isonandra Wight
- Labatia Sw.
- Labourdonnaisia Bojer
- Labramia A.DC.
- Lecomtedoxa Dubard
- Letestua Lecomte
- Lucuma Molina
- Madhuca Buch.-Ham. ex J.F.Gmel.
- Magodendron Vink
- Malacantha Pierre
- Manilkara Adans.
- Martiusella Pierre
- Micropholis (Griseb.) Pierre
- Mimusops L.
- Nemaluma Baill.
- Neohemsleya T.D.Penn.
- Neolemonniera Heine
- Niemeyera F.Muell.
- Northia Hook.f.
- Omphalocarpum P.Beauv.
- Palaquium Blanco
- Payena A.DC.
- Peteniodendron Lundell
- Pichonia Pierre
- Planchonella Pierre
- Pleioluma (Baill.) Baehni
- Pouteria Aubl.
- Pradosia Liais
- Prieurella Pierre
- Pycnandra Benth.
- Ragala Pierre
- Sahulia Swenson
- Sarcaulus Radlk.
- Sarcosperma Hook.f.
- Sersalisia R.Br.
- Sideroxylon L.
- Spiniluma (Baill.) Aubrév.
- Synsepalum (A.DC.) Daniell
- Tieghemella Pierre
- Tridesmostemon Engl.
- Tsebona Capuron
- Van-royena Aubrév.
- Vitellaria C.F.Gaertn.
- Vitellariopsis (Baill.) Dubard
- Xantolis Raf.
