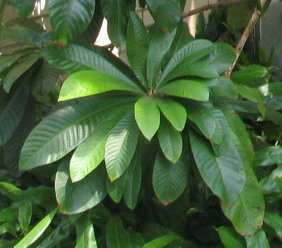
- Leaves of the mamey sapote (P. sapota)

Scientific classification
- Kingdom: Plantae
- Clade: Tracheophytes
- Clade: Angiosperms
- Clade: Eudicots
- Clade: Asterids
- Order: Ericales
- Family: Sapotaceae
- Subfamily: Chrysophylloideae
- Genus: Pouteria; Aubl.

Species
- Many, see text

Synonyms
- Many, see text

= Pouteria =

Genus of trees

Pouteria is a genus of flowering trees in the gutta-percha family, Sapotaceae. The genus is widespread throughout the tropical Americas, with outlier species in Cameroon and Malesia. It includes the green sapote (P. viridis), the mamey sapote (P. sapota), and the abiu (P. caimito). Commonly, this genus is known as pouteria trees.

Pouteria is related to Manilkara, another genus that produces hard and heavy woods (e.g. balatá, M. bidentata) used commonly for tropical construction, as well as edible fruit (such as sapodilla, M. zapota).

== Range ==
Pouteria, as currently delineated, has 170 species in the tropical Americas, from Mexico to northern Argentina and central Chile, including Florida and the Caribbean islands. Four species are found outside the Americas. Pouteria hexastemon is native to Cameroon in west-central Africa, and three species are native to Indonesia – Pouteria celebica to Sulawesi, Pouteria lucida to Maluku, and Pouteria oxyedra to Sumatra.

== Uses ==
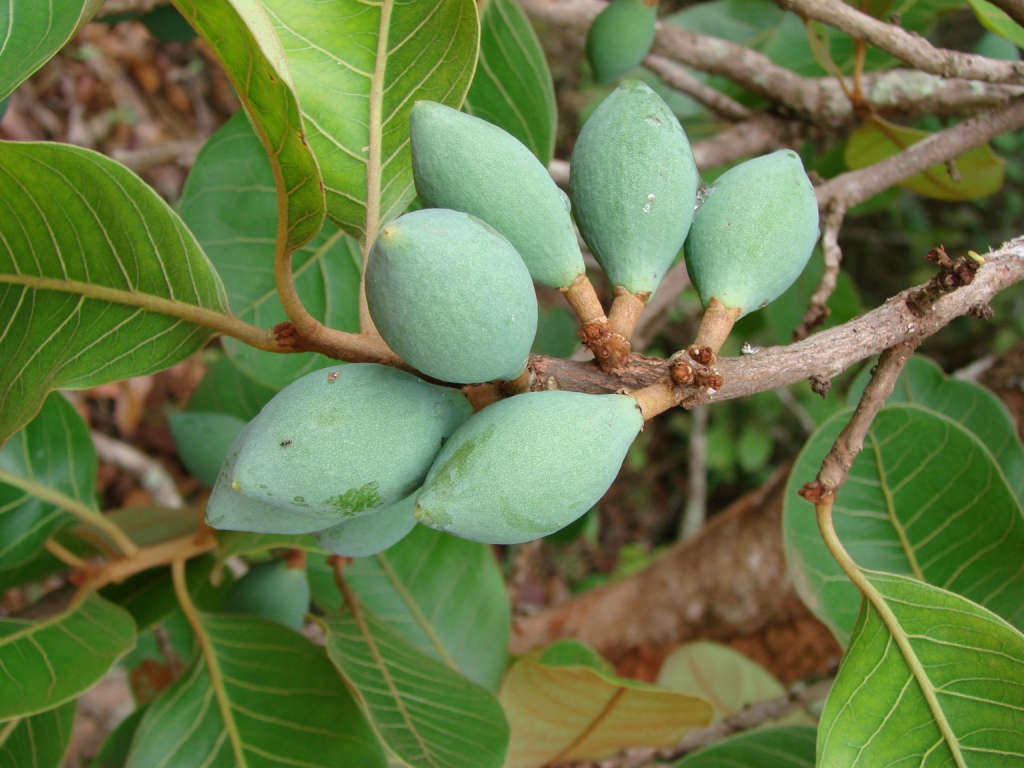
Fruits of P. ramiflora

Many species, such as Pouteria sapota, have edible fruits and are important foods, seasonally. Some are being commercially collected and sold on local markets or packed in cans.

Pouteria species yield hard, heavy, resilient woods used as firewood and timber, but particularly in outdoor and naval construction, such as dock pilings, deckings, etc. Some species, such as abiu (P. caimito), are considered to be shipworm resistant, but this depends on the silica content, which may vary from 0.0-0.9%. The weight by volume (at 12% moisture content) of Pouteria wood can be in excess of 1140 kg/m^{3} (71 lb/ft^{3}; thus, the wood sinks in water. The wood of Pouteria species is prone to considerable movement and warping when it dries out, but in its main use, naval construction, this is not a problem, since the wood never gets really dry.

The vessel elements are relatively small and usually di- to quadriseriate; the medullary rays are fine and close together. Pouteria woods are capable of attaining an excellent polish using fine-grained sandpaper and possibly some wax. They can sometimes show an attractive figure of dark stripes against a sandy to mid-brown background colour. However, the wood is hardly used for furniture because it is so dense that items made from it would be difficult to transport. Moreover, it is nearly impossible to work using hand tools. Even using power tools, working these woods presents some problems, as well, but given some patience and practical knowledge, these can easily be solved.

For the silica to be effective against shipworms, it needs to dry to some degree to harden. When the wood is continually waterlogged, this process may take place very slowly or not at all, leaving the wood vulnerable.

Pouteria foliage is used as food by some Lepidoptera caterpillars, including those of the dalcerid moth Dalcera abrasa, which has been recorded on P. ramiflora. The fruits are important food for various animals, such as the rock-haunting ringtail possum (Petropseudes dahli).

Due to habitat loss and in some cases overexploitation, many species of Pouteria are threatened. At least 10 are close to extinction.

== Systematics and taxonomy ==
Pouteria is a "wastebasket taxon", and its size is continually being expanded or decreased. The segregated Labatia, described by Olof Swartz in 1788 and named after the French botanist Jean-Baptiste Labat, was maintained as a distinct entity until the 1930s, when it was synonymized with Pouteria. Most segregated genera that were merged with Pouteria again were established by Henri Ernest Baillon and Jean Baptiste Louis Pierre.

Recent phylogenetic and morphological studies found Pouteria to be polyphyletic, and many genera previously subsumed into Pouteria and/or Chrysophyllum, including Achrouteria, Chloroluma, Cornuella, Englerella, Labatia, Lucuma, Martiusella, Nemaluma, Peteniodendron, Prieurella, and Ragala, have been reinstated.

=== Accepted species ===
Plants of the World Online currently accepts 170 species.

- Pouteria alvesii Alves-Araújo – Brazil (Pernambuco and Bahia)
- Pouteria amapaensis Pires & T.D.Penn. – Brazil (Amapá)
- Pouteria amazonica Radlk. – Brazil (Amazonas)
- Pouteria ambelaniifolia (Sandwith) T.D.Penn. – Venezuela, Guyana, French Guiana, and northern Brazil
- Pouteria amygdalicarpa (Pittier) T.D.Penn. – Nicaragua to Venezuela and Ecuador
- Pouteria amygdalina (Standl.) Baehni – southeastern Mexico, Guatemala, Belize, and Costa Rica
- Pouteria andarahiensis T.D.Penn. – Brazil (Bahia)
- Pouteria anteridata T.D.Penn. – Venezuela
- Pouteria arcuata T.D.Penn. – southeastern Colombia and Venezuela (Amazonas)
- Pouteria areolatifolia Lundell – Guatemala (Petén)
- Pouteria aristata (Britton & P.Wilson) Baehni – Cuba
- Pouteria atabapoensis (Aubrév.) T.D.Penn. – Venezuela (Amazonas) and Brazil (Amazonas)
- Pouteria atlantica Alves-Araújo & M.Alves – Brazil (southeastern Bahia)
- Pouteria aubrevillei Bernardi – northern Brazil, French Guiana, Colombia, and Peru
- Pouteria aurea T.D.Penn. – Ecuador
- Pouteria austin-smithii (Standl.) Cronquist – Costa Rica and Panama
- Pouteria baehniana Monach. – Venezuela to Bolivia
- Pouteria bangii (Rusby) T.D.Penn. – northern South America
- Pouteria bapeba T.D.Penn. – Brazil (southeastern Bahia to northern Espírito Santo)
- Pouteria belizensis (Standl.) Cronquist – Mexico (Veracruz, Tabasco, Chiapas) to Nicaragua
- Pouteria benai (Aubrév. & Pellegr.) T.D.Penn. – French Guiana
- Pouteria bilocularis (H.J.P.Winkl.) Baehni – northern South America
- Pouteria bonneriana Bernardi – Peru (Loreto)
- Pouteria bracteata T.D.Penn. – Nicaragua to western Ecuador
- Pouteria brevensis Pires – Brazil (Pará)
- Pouteria brevipetiolata T.D.Penn. – Ecuador
- Pouteria briocheoides Lundell – Mexico (Chiapas) and Guatemala
- Pouteria buenaventurensis (Aubrév.) Pilz – Panama to Ecuador
- Pouteria bullata (S.Moore) Baehni – Brazil (Rio de Janeiro, São Paulo, and Paraná)
- Pouteria butyrocarpa (Kuhlm.) T.D.Penn. – Brazil (southeastern Bahia to Espírito Santo)
- Pouteria caimito (Ruiz & Pav.) Radlk. – abiu – Nicaragua, Costa Rica, Panama, northern South America, and Trinidad and Tobago
- Pouteria calistophylla (Standl.) Baehni – Costa Rica and Panama
- Pouteria campanulata Baehni – Brazil (Amazonas and Pará)
- Pouteria canaimaensis T.D.Penn. – Venezuela (Bolívar)
- Pouteria cayennensis (A.DC.) Eyma – southeastern Colombia, Venezuela, Guyana, French Guiana, and northern Brazil
- Pouteria celebica Erlee – Sulawesi
- Pouteria chiricana (Standl.) Baehni – Costa Rica and Panama
- Pouteria chocoensis (Aubrév.) T.D.Penn. – western Colombia
- Pouteria cicatricata T.D.Penn. – Brazil (Amazonas and Rondônia)
- Pouteria cinnamomea (Diels) Baehni – Peru (Cusco)
- Pouteria citriodora Alves-Araújo – Brazil (Bahia)
- Pouteria cladantha Sandwith – tropical South America
- Pouteria coelomatica Rizzini – Brazil (southeastern Bahia to Rio de Janeiro)
- Pouteria collina (Little) T.D.Penn. – Colombia and northern Ecuador
- Pouteria condorensis T.D.Penn. – Ecuador
- Pouteria cordiformis T.D.Penn. – Ecuador
- Pouteria coriacea (Pierre) Pierre – Ecuador, Colombia, Venezuela, Trinidad, the Guianas, and northern Brazil
- Pouteria crassiflora Pires & T.D.Penn. – Venezuela (Amazonas) and Brazil (Amapá and Pará)
- Pouteria cubensis Baehni – Cuba (Sierra Maestra)
- Pouteria cuspidata (A.DC.) Baehni – Costa Rica to Bolivia and southeastern Brazil
- Pouteria decorticans T.D.Penn. – northwestern Venezuela, northern Brazil, and French Guiana
- Pouteria decussata (Ducke) Baehni – Brazil (Pará)
- Pouteria deliciosa T.D.Penn. – French Guiana, Colombia, and Peru
- Pouteria dictyoneura (Griseb.) Radlk.
- Pouteria egregia Sandwith – Colombia and northeastern Brazil
- Pouteria elegans (A.DC.) Baehni – Colombia, Venezuela, Guyana, northern Brazil, Peru, and Bolivia
- Pouteria engleri Eyma – Colombia, Venezuela, the Guianas, and northern Brazil
- Pouteria ephedrantha (A.C.Sm.) T.D.Penn. – southeast Colombia, Ecuador, Peru, Bolivia, and Brazil (Acre)
- Pouteria ericoides T.D.Penn. – Brazil (Amazonas: near Manaus)
- Pouteria erythrochrysa T.D.Penn. – Brazil (Amazonas: near Manaus)
- Pouteria espinae (Standl.) Baehni – Colombia
- Pouteria eugeniifolia (Pierre) Baehni – Colombia, Venezuela, the Guianas, and northern Brazil
- Pouteria euryphylla (Standl.) Baehni – Panama
- Pouteria exfoliata T.D.Penn. – Costa Rica and Panama
- Pouteria exstaminodia Pires & T.D.Penn. – Brazil (Amazonas)
- Pouteria filiformis T.D.Penn. – Costa Rica
- Pouteria fossicola Cronquist – Nicaragua, Costa Rica, and Panama
- Pouteria foveolata T.D.Penn. – Nicaragua, Costa Rica, and Panama
- Pouteria fragrans (Pierre) Dubard – Paraguay and northeastern Argentina
- Pouteria franciscana Baehni – northern and northeastern Bolivia, northern Brazil, and northeastern Brazil (southeastern Bahia)
- Pouteria freitasii T.D.Penn. – Brazil (Amazonas: near Manaus)
- Pouteria fulva T.D.Penn. – Brazil (Amazonas)
- Pouteria furcata T.D.Penn. – northeastern Brazil (Maranhão and Piauí)
- Pouteria gabrielensis (Gilly ex Aubrév.) T.D.Penn. – southeastern Colombia, Venezuela, and northern Brazil
- Pouteria gallifructa Cronquist – Guatemala, Belize, Honduras, and Costa Rica; northeastern Brazil
- Pouteria gardneri (Mart. & Eichler) Baehni – Brazil, Bolivia, and Paraguay
- Pouteria gigantea (Diels) Pilz – Ecuador
- Pouteria glauca T.D.Penn. – Colombia, Peru, Bolivia, northern and northeastern Brazil, French Guiana, and Suriname
- Pouteria glomerata (Miq.) Radlk. – Mexico to northeastern Argentina

- Pouteria glomerata subsp. stylosa (Pierre) T.D.Penn. – Costa Rica, Panama, Colombia, Venezuela, and northern Brazil

- Pouteria gomphiifolia (Mart. ex Miq.) Radlk. – Colombia, Peru, Bolivia, and northern Brazil
- Pouteria gongrijpii Eyma – Colombia, Peru, Bolivia, northern and northeastern Brazil, French Guiana, and Suriname
- Pouteria gracilis T.D.Penn. – Peru (San Martín)
- Pouteria guianensis Aubl. – Panama, northern South America, and Trinidad
- Pouteria hexastemon Baehni – Cameroon
- Pouteria hotteana (Urb. & Ekman) Baehni – Haiti and Puerto Rico
- Pouteria izabalensis (Standl.) Baehni – Mexico (Chiapas) to Costa Rica
- Pouteria juruana K.Krause – Costa Rica, Panama, Colombia, Ecuador, Peru, and northern Brazil
- Pouteria kaieteurensis T.D.Penn. – Guyana (Kaieteur Plateau)
- Pouteria krukovii (A.C.Sm.) Baehni – Colombia, Brazil (Acre), and Peru (Loreto)
- Pouteria latianthera T.D.Penn. – Venezuela (Amazonas) and Brazil (Amapá)
- Pouteria leptopedicellata Pilz – Costa Rica to Ecuador
- Pouteria longifolia (Mart. & Eichler) T.D.Penn. – Peru (San Martín) and Bolivia (La Paz)
- Pouteria lucens (Mart. & Miq.) Radlk. – Brazil (Amazonas)
- Pouteria lucida (H.J.Lam) Baehni – Maluku
- Pouteria lucumifolia (Reissek ex Maxim.) T.D.Penn. – Colombia, Venezuela, northern Brazil, Ecuador, Peru
- Pouteria macahensis T.D.Penn. – northeastern and eastern Brazil (Pernambuco to Rio de Janeiro)
- Pouteria macrocarpa (Mart.) D.Dietr. – Colombia, northern Brazil, and southeastern Brazil
- Pouteria macrophylla (Lam.) Eyma – Colombia, Peru, Bolivia, northern, central, and eastern Brazil, Suriname and French Guiana
- Pouteria maguirei (Aubrév.) T.D.Penn. – southeast Colombia, Venezuela (Amazonas), and northwestern Brazil
- Pouteria mattogrossensis (Pilg.) Baehni – Brazil (Mato Grosso)
- Pouteria megaphylla T.D.Penn. – Ecuador
- Pouteria melanopoda Eyma – Suriname and French Guiana
- Pouteria micrantha (Urb.) Baehni – eastern Cuba (Lomas de Cuaba and Sierra de Nipe)
- Pouteria microstrigosa T.D.Penn. – eastern Brazil (southeastern Bahia, Espírito Santo, and Minas Gerais)
- Pouteria minima T.D.Penn. – Venezuela (Bolívar) and Brazil (northwestern Amazonas)
- Pouteria mongaguensis Mattos – Brazil (São Paulo)
- Pouteria nemorosa Baehni – eastern Bolivia
- Pouteria nudipetala T.D.Penn. – southeastern Colombia, Ecuador, Peru, and northern Brazil
- Pouteria oblanceolata Pires – Colombia, Ecuador, Peru, Venezuela, French Guiana, and northern and northeastern Brazil
- Pouteria obscura (Huber) Baehni – Brazil (Pará)
- Pouteria opposita (Ducke) T.D.Penn. – Peru and northern Brazil
- Pouteria orinocoensis (Aubrév.) T.D.Penn. – central and southern Venezuela
- Pouteria oxyedra (Miq.) Baehni – Sumatra
- Pouteria pachyphylla T.D.Penn. – northern Brazil (Amazonas and Rondônia)
- Pouteria pallida (C.F.Gaertn.) Baehni – Leeward Islands, Windward Islands, Trinidad and Tobago
- Pouteria penicillata Baehni – Guyan
- Pouteria pentamera T.D.Penn. – Brazil (Amazonas: near Manaus)
- Pouteria peruviensis (Aubrév.) Bernardi – Peru (Loreto)
- Pouteria pimichinensis T.D.Penn. – Colombia (Guainía) and Venezuela (southeastern Amazonas)
- Pouteria pisquiensis Baehni – Peru (Ucayali)
- Pouteria platyphylla (A.C.Sm.) Baehni – northern and west-central Brazil (Amazonas and Mato Grosso), Ecuador, and Peru (Loreto)
- Pouteria plicata T.D.Penn. – Colombia, Venezuela, Peru, Bolivia, and northern, northeastern, and west-central Brazil
- Pouteria polycarpa (Rusby) Baehni – Bolivia
- Pouteria polysepala T.D.Penn. – Ecuador, Peru, Bolivia, and northern Brazil
- Pouteria procera (Mart.) K.Hammer – Colombia, Peru, Bolivia, Venezuela, and northern and eastern Brazil
- Pouteria puberula T.D.Penn. – Venezuela (Miranda)
- Pouteria pubescens (Aubrév. & Pellegr.) T.D.Penn. – southeastern Colombia, Ecuador, Peru, and northern Brazil
- Pouteria pullei Eyma – Suriname
- Pouteria putamen-ovi T.D.Penn. – southern Colombia, northern Peru, and northern Brazil
- Pouteria quicheana Cronquist – Guatemala
- Pouteria ramiflora (Mart.) Radlk. – Brazil, Bolivia, and Paraguay
- Pouteria resinosa T.D.Penn. – northern Brazil (Amazonas: near Manaus)
- Pouteria reticulata (Engl.) Eyma – southern Mexico, Central America, and northern South America
- Pouteria retinervis T.D.Penn. – southeastern Colombia, northern Brazil, and French Guiana
- Pouteria rhynchocarpa T.D.Penn. – southern Mexico (Veracruz and Oacaca)
- Pouteria rigida (Mart. & Eichler) Radlk. – southern Venezuela, Guyana, and northern Brazil
- Pouteria rigidopsis Monach. ex T.D.Penn. – northern and northeastern Venezuela
- Pouteria rostrata (Huber) Baehni – Colombia, Ecuador, Peru, and northern and west-central Brazil
- Pouteria rufotomentosa (Lundell) T.D.Penn. – Mexico (Oaxaca) and Guatemala
- Pouteria sagotiana (Baill.) Eyma – Guianas and northern Brazil (Amapá)
- Pouteria samborae Alves-Araújo & Mônico – Brazil (Espírito Santo)
- Pouteria sambuensis (Pittier) Baehni – Panama
- Pouteria sapota (Jacq.) H.E.Moore & Stearn – mamey sapote – Mexico and Central America
- Pouteria scabritesta T.D.Penn. – Ecuador
- Pouteria sclerocarpa (Pittier) Cronquist – Panama, Colombia, Venezuela, Ecuador, and Peru
- Pouteria scrobiculata Monach. ex T.D.Penn. – Colombia (Caquetá), Venezuela, Guyana, and northern Brazil
- Pouteria semecarpifolia (Pierre ex Duss) Pierre – Leeward Islands and Windward Islands
- Pouteria sessilis T.D.Penn. – Peru (Loreto)
- Pouteria silvestris T.D.Penn. – Costa Rica (Heredia), Colombia (Chocó), and Ecuador
- Pouteria simulans Monach. – Panama, Colombia, Venezuela, Ecuador, and Peru
- Pouteria singularis T.D.Penn. – Venezuela, northern Brazil, and French Guiana
- Pouteria sipapoensis T.D.Penn. – Venezuela (Amazonas)
- Pouteria spicata J.F.Morales – Costa Rica
- Pouteria squamosa Cronquist – southern Mexico (southern Veracruz and Oaxaca) and Guatemala
- Pouteria stipitata Cronquist – Panama, Colombia, Venezuela, and northern Brazil (Rondônia)
- Pouteria stylifera T.D.Penn. – northern Brazil (Amazonas: near Manaus)
- Pouteria subrotata Cronquist – Nicaragua to Venezuela and Peru
- Pouteria subsessilifolia Cronquist – northeastern Brazil (Bahia)
- Pouteria surumuensis Baehni – Colombia, Venezuela, Guyana, northern Brazil, Peru, and Bolivia
- Pouteria synsepala Popovkin & A.D.Faria – northeastern Brazil (Bahia)
- Pouteria tarapotensis (Eichler ex Pierre) Baehni – Peru and western Bolivia
- Pouteria tarumanensis Pires – northern Brazil (Amazonas: near Manaus)
- Pouteria tenuisepala Pires & T.D.Penn. – French Guiana and northern Brazil (Amapá and Pará)
- Pouteria torta (Mart.) Radlk. – Abiurana – southern Mexico to Bolivia, Paraguay, and southern Brazil

- subsp. tuberculata (Sleumer) T.D.Penn. – Red Abiorana – southern Mexico, Central America, Colombia, Ecuador, Venezuela, northern Brazil, and French Guiana

- Pouteria trifida Alves-Araújo & M.Alves – northeastern Brazil (southeastern Bahia)
- Pouteria trilocularis Cronquist – Costa Rica and Colombia, Venezuela, northern and west-central Brazil, Ecuador, and Bolivia
- Pouteria triplarifolia C.K.Allen ex T.D. Pennington – Costa Rica (Puntarenas)
- Pouteria tuberculata (Sleumer) Alves-Araújo & Swenson – southern Mexico to Peru and northern Brazil
- Pouteria ucuqui Pires & R.E.Schult. – southeastern Colombia, Venezuela, and northern Brazil
- Pouteria undulatifolia Rizzini – west-central Brazil
- Pouteria validinervis (Sleumer) Baehni – Ecuador
- Pouteria velutinicarpa Alves-Araújo & M.Alves – Brazil (southeastern Bahia)
- Pouteria vernicosa T.D.Penn. – southeastern Colombia, northern Brazil (Amazonas), and Peru (Huánuco)
- Pouteria viridis (Pittier) Cronquist – southern Mexico (Veracruz and Chiapas) to Costa Rica

=== Formerly placed here ===
- Aningeria adolfi-friederici (as P. adolfi-friederici)
- Aningeria altissima (as P. altissima)
- Aningeria pseudoracemosa (as P. pseudoracemosa)
- Chromolucuma congestifolia (as P. congestifolia)
- Chromolucuma flavilatex (T.D.Penn.) Alves-Araújo (as P. flavilatex T.D.Penn.)
- Chromolucuma stipulifera (T.D.Penn.) Alves-Araújo (as P. stipulifera T.D.Penn.)
- Chromolucuma williamii (Aubrév. & Pellegr.) Alves-Araújo (as P. williamii (Aubrév. & Pellegr.) T.D.Penn.)
- Englerella macrocarpa Pierre (as P. speciosa (Ducke) Baehni)
- Englerophytum magalismontanum (as P. magalismontana)
- Gayella valparadisaea (Molina) Pierre (as P. splendens (A.DC.) Kuntze)
- Labatia beaurepairei (Glaz. & Raunk.) Engl. (as P. beaurepairei (Glaz. & Raunk.) Baehni)
- Labatia ciliata (Alves-Araújo & M.Alves) Alves-Araújo (as P. ciliata Alves-Araújo & M.Alves)
- Labatia confusa (Alves-Araújo & M.Alves) Alves-Araújo (as P. confusa Alves-Araújo & M.Alves)
- Labatia filipes (Eyma) Alves-Araújo (as P. filipes Eyma)
- Labatia fimbriata (Baehni) Alves-Araújo (as P. fimbriata Baehni)
- Labatia gardneriana (A.DC.) Alves-Araújo (as P. gardneriana (A.DC.) Radlk.)
- Labatia lecythidicarpa (P.E.Sánchez & Poveda) Swenson & Alves-Araújo (as P. lecythidicarpa P.E.Sánchez & Poveda)
- Labatia nordestinensis (Alves-Araújo & M.Alves) Alves-Araújo (as P. nordestinensis Alves-Araújo & M.Alves)
- Labatia pariry (Ducke) Alves-Araújo (as P. pariry (Ducke) Baehni)
- Labatia petiolata (T.D.Penn.) Alves-Araújo (as P. petiolata T.D.Penn.)
- Labatia psammophila Mart. (as P. psammophila (Mart.) Radlk.)
- Labatia salicifolia (Spreng.) Mart. (as P. salicifolia (Spreng.) Radlk.)
- Labatia sessiliflora Sw. (as P. sessiliflora (Sw.) Poir.)
- Labatia subcaerulea (Pierre ex Dubard) Alves-Araújo (as P. subcaerulea Pierre ex Dubard)
- Lucuma arguacoensium H.Karst. (as P. arguacoensium (H.Karst.) Baehni)
- Lucuma bifera Molina (as P. lucuma (Ruiz & Pav.) Kuntze)
- Lucuma brachyandra (Aubrév. & Pellegr.) Swenson (as P. brachyandra (Aubrév. & Pellegr.) T.D.Penn.)
- Lucuma campechiana Kunth (as P. campechiana (Kunth) Baehni) – canistel, yellow sapote
- Lucuma capacifolia (Pilz) Swenson (as P. capacifolia Pilz)
- Lucuma dominigensis C.F.Gaertn. (as P. dominigensis (C.F.Gaertn.) Baehni)
- Lucuma grandiflora A.DC. (as P. grandiflora (A.DC.) Baehni)
- Lucuma grandis (Eyma) Swenson (as P. grandis Eyma)
- Lucuma kossmanniae (C.C.Vasconc. & Terra-Araujo) C.C.Vasconc. (as P. kossmanniae C.C.Vasconcelos & Terra-Araujo)
- Lucuma manaosensis (Aubrév. & Pellegr.) Swenson (as P. manaosensis (Aubrév. & Pellegr.) T.D.Penn.)
- Lucuma multiflora A.DC. (as P. multiflora (A.DC.) Eyma)
- Lucuma oxypetala (T.D.Penn.) Swenson (as P. oxypetala T.D.Penn.)
- Lucuma pachycalyx (T.D.Penn.) Swenson (as P. pachycalyx T.D.Penn.)
- Lucuma rodriguesiana (Pires & T.D.Penn.) Swenson (as P. rodriguesiana Pires & T.D.Penn.)
- Lucuma stenophylla (Baehni) Swenson (as P. stenophylla Baehni)
- Lucuma trigonosperma (Eyma) Swenson (as P. trigonosperma Eyma)
- Lucuma venosa (Mart.) Mart. & Miq. (as P. venosa (Mart.) Baehni)
- Micropholis laevigata (Mart.) Swenson & A.D.Faria (as P. laevigata (Mart.) Radlk.)
- Micropholis maxima (T.D.Penn.) Swenson & A.D.Faria (as P. maxima T.D.Penn.)
- Micropholis oppositifolia (Ducke) Swenson (as P. oppositifolia (Ducke) Baehni)
- Nemaluma anomala (Pires) Swenson (as P. anomala (Pires) T.D.Penn.)
- Peteniodendron durlandii (Standl.) Lundell (as P. durlandii (Standl.) Baehni)
- Peteniodendron jariense (Pires & T.D.Penn.) Swenson (as P. jariensis Pires & T.D.Penn.)
- Peteniodendron pallens (T.D.Penn.) Swenson (as P. pallens T.D.Penn.)
- Peteniodendron virescens (Baehni) Swenson (as P. virescens Baehni)
- Pichonia daenikeri (as P. daenikeri)
- Planchonella australis (as P. australis)
- Planchonella contermina (as P. contermina)
- Planchonella costata (as P. costata)
- Planchonella eerwah (as P. eerwah)
- Planchonella kaalaensis (as P. kaalaensis)
- Planchonella myrsinoides (as P. myrsinoides)
- Planchonella myrsinifolia subsp. howeana (as P. howeana)
- Planchonella maclayana (as P. maclayana)
- Planchonella malaccensis (as P. malaccensis)
- Planchonella obovata (as P. obovata)
- Planchonella sandwicensis (as P. sandwicensis)
- Pleioluma balansana (as P. brevipedicellata)
- Synsepalum dulcificum (as P. dulcifica) – miracle fruit

=== Synonyms ===
Due to the uncertainty regarding its actual content, the number of synonyms of Pouteria is massive. Plants of the World Online currently treats the following genera as synonyms.

- Barylucuma Ducke (1925)
- Caleatia Mart. ex Steud. (1841), pro syn.
- Caramuri Aubrév. & Pellegr. (1961)
- Chaetocarpus Schreb. (1789), nom. rej.
- Discoluma Baill. (1891)
- Eremoluma Baill. (1891)
- Franchetella Pierre (1890)
- Gomphiluma Baill. (1891)
- Guapeba Gomes (1812)
- Guapebeira Gomes (1803)
- Ichthyophora Baehni (1964)
- Krugella Pierre (1891)
- Leioluma Baill. (1891)
- Microluma Baill. (1891)
- Myrtiluma Baill. (1891)
- Neoxythece Aubrév. & Pellegr. (1961)
- Oxythece Miq. (1863), nom. illeg.
- Paralabatia Pierre (1890)
- Piresodendron Aubrév. ex Le Thomas (1983)
- Podoluma Baill. (1891)
- Prozetia Neck. (1790), opus utique oppr.
- Pseudocladia Pierre (1891)
- Pseudolabatia Aubrév. & Pellegr. (1962)
- Pseudoxythece Aubrév. (1972)
- Sandwithiodoxa Aubrév. & Pellegr. (1962)
- Urbanella Pierre (1890)

The following genera are sometimes included in Pouteria. Their current treatment by Plants of the World Online is included here.

- Achradelpha O.F.Cook – synonym of Manilkara
- Albertisiella Pierre ex Aubrév. – synonym of Planchonella
- Aningeria Aubrév. & Pellegr. – accepted genus
- Beauvisagea Pierre – synonym of Planchonella
- Beccariella Pierre – synonym of Pleioluma
- Beccarimnia Pierre ex Koord.
- Blabeia Baehni – synonym of Planchonella
- Boerlagella Cogn. - synonym of Planchonella
- Bureavella Pierre – synonym of Planchonella
- Calocarpum Pierre – synonym of Manilkara
- Calospermum Pierre – synonym of Manilkara
- Eglerodendron Aubrév. & Pellegr. (1962) – synonym of Labatia
- Englerella Pierre (1891) – accepted genus
- Fontbrunea Pierre – synonym of Planchonella
- Gayella Pierre (1890) – accepted genus
- Hormogyne A.DC. – synonym of Planchonella
- Iteiluma Baill. – synonym of Planchonella
- Krausella H.J.Lam – synonym of Planchonella
- Labatia Sw. (1788), nom. cons. – accepted genus
- Lucuma Molina (1782) – accepted genus
- Malacantha Pierre – accepted genus
- Nemaluma Baill. (1891) – accepted genus
- Neolabatia Aubrév. (1972), nom. illeg. – synonym of Labatia
- Peteniodendron Lundell (1976) – accepted genus
- Peuceluma Baill. – synonym of Planchonella
- Planchonella Pierre - accepted genus
- Pleioluma (Baill.) Baehni – accepted genus
- Poissonella Pierre – synonym of Planchonella
- Pyriluma (Baill.) Aubrév. – synonym of Planchonella
- Radlkoferella Pierre (1890) – synonym of Lucuma
- Richardella Pierre (1890) – synonym of Lucuma
- Sersalisia R.Br. - accepted genus
- Siderocarpus Pierre – synonym of Planchonella
- Syzygiopsis Ducke (1925) – synonym of Micropholis
- Van-royena Aubrév. – accepted genus
- Woikoia Baehni
- Wokoia Baehni – synonym of Pichonia
