= Eugenia tabouensis =

Conservation status
- Vulnerable (IUCN 2.3)

Scientific classification
- Kingdom: Plantae
- Clade: Tracheophytes
- Clade: Angiosperms
- Clade: Eudicots
- Clade: Rosids
- Order: Myrtales
- Family: Myrtaceae
- Genus: Eugenia
- Species: E. tabouensis

Binomial name
- Eugenia tabouensis Aubrév.

Species of tree

Eugenia tabouensis is a small tree in the family Myrtaceae. It is endemic to the tropical rainforests of Ivory Coast. It is threatened by habitat loss.
