= Pouteria chiricana =

Conservation status
- Vulnerable (IUCN 2.3)

Scientific classification
- Kingdom: Plantae
- Clade: Tracheophytes
- Clade: Angiosperms
- Clade: Eudicots
- Clade: Asterids
- Order: Ericales
- Family: Sapotaceae
- Genus: Pouteria
- Species: P. chiricana

Binomial name
- Pouteria chiricana (Standl.) Baehni

Species of flowering plant

Pouteria chiricana is a species of plant in the family Sapotaceae. It is endemic to Panama.
