= Pouteria sagotiana =

Conservation status
- Least Concern (IUCN 2.3)

Scientific classification
- Kingdom: Plantae
- Clade: Tracheophytes
- Clade: Angiosperms
- Clade: Eudicots
- Clade: Asterids
- Order: Ericales
- Family: Sapotaceae
- Genus: Pouteria
- Species: P. sagotiana

Binomial name
- Pouteria sagotiana (Baill.) Eyma

Species of flowering plant

Pouteria sagotiana is a species of plant in the family Sapotaceae. It is found in Brazil, French Guiana, Guyana, and Suriname.
