= Pouteria buenaventurensis =

Conservation status
- Near Threatened (IUCN 2.3)

Scientific classification
- Kingdom: Plantae
- Clade: Tracheophytes
- Clade: Angiosperms
- Clade: Eudicots
- Clade: Asterids
- Order: Ericales
- Family: Sapotaceae
- Genus: Pouteria
- Species: P. buenaventurensis

Binomial name
- Pouteria buenaventurensis (Aubrév.) Pilz

Species of flowering plant

Pouteria buenaventurensis is a species of plant in the family Sapotaceae. It is found in Colombia and Panama.
