= Pouteria decussata =

Conservation status
- Data Deficient (IUCN 3.1)

Scientific classification
- Kingdom: Plantae
- Clade: Tracheophytes
- Clade: Angiosperms
- Clade: Eudicots
- Clade: Asterids
- Order: Ericales
- Family: Sapotaceae
- Genus: Pouteria
- Species: P. decussata

Binomial name
- Pouteria decussata (Ducke) Baehni

Synonyms
- Barylucuma decussata Ducke

Species of flowering plant

Pouteria decussata is a species of plant in the family Sapotaceae. It is endemic to Brazil.
