= Pouteria platyphylla =

Conservation status
- Near Threatened (IUCN 2.3)

Scientific classification
- Kingdom: Plantae
- Clade: Tracheophytes
- Clade: Angiosperms
- Clade: Eudicots
- Clade: Asterids
- Order: Ericales
- Family: Sapotaceae
- Genus: Pouteria
- Species: P. platyphylla

Binomial name
- Pouteria platyphylla (A.C.Sm.) Baehni

Species of flowering plant

Pouteria platyphylla is a species of plant in the family Sapotaceae. It is found in Brazil and Peru.
