= Pouteria cubensis =

Conservation status
- Vulnerable (IUCN 3.1)

Scientific classification
- Kingdom: Plantae
- Clade: Tracheophytes
- Clade: Angiosperms
- Clade: Eudicots
- Clade: Asterids
- Order: Ericales
- Family: Sapotaceae
- Genus: Pouteria
- Species: P. cubensis

Binomial name
- Pouteria cubensis Baehni

Synonyms
- Labatia grandifolia Urb.

Species of flowering plant

Pouteria cubensis is a species of flowering plant in the family Sapotaceae. It is endemic to the Sierra Maestra in eastern Cuba.
