= Pouteria atabapoensis =

Conservation status
- Near Threatened (IUCN 2.3)

Scientific classification
- Kingdom: Plantae
- Clade: Tracheophytes
- Clade: Angiosperms
- Clade: Eudicots
- Clade: Asterids
- Order: Ericales
- Family: Sapotaceae
- Genus: Pouteria
- Species: P. atabapoensis

Binomial name
- Pouteria atabapoensis (Aubrév.) T.D.Penn.

Species of flowering plant

Pouteria atabapoensis is a species of plant in the family Sapotaceae. It is found in Brazil and Venezuela.
