= Pouteria pubescens =

Conservation status
- Vulnerable (IUCN 2.3)

Scientific classification
- Kingdom: Plantae
- Clade: Tracheophytes
- Clade: Angiosperms
- Clade: Eudicots
- Clade: Asterids
- Order: Ericales
- Family: Sapotaceae
- Genus: Pouteria
- Species: P. pubescens

Binomial name
- Pouteria pubescens (Aubrév. & Pellegr.) T.D.Penn.

Species of flowering plant

Pouteria pubescens is a species of plant in the genus Pouteria within the family Sapotaceae. It is found in Brazil and Peru. Its conservation status is vulnerable. The fruit of this plant are edible and are known as eggfruits. It is a hardwood neotropical plant.
