= Pouteria pallida =

Conservation status
- Endangered (IUCN 2.3)

Scientific classification
- Kingdom: Plantae
- Clade: Tracheophytes
- Clade: Angiosperms
- Clade: Eudicots
- Clade: Asterids
- Order: Ericales
- Family: Sapotaceae
- Genus: Pouteria
- Species: P. pallida

Binomial name
- Pouteria pallida (C.F.Gaertn.) Baehni

Species of flowering plant

Pouteria pallida is a species of plant in the family Sapotaceae. It is found in Dominica, Guadeloupe, Martinique, and Saint Lucia.
