= Pouteria micrantha =

Conservation status
- Critically Endangered (IUCN 3.1)

Scientific classification
- Kingdom: Plantae
- Clade: Tracheophytes
- Clade: Angiosperms
- Clade: Eudicots
- Clade: Asterids
- Order: Ericales
- Family: Sapotaceae
- Genus: Pouteria
- Species: P. micrantha

Binomial name
- Pouteria micrantha (Urb.) Baehni

Synonyms
- Labatia micrantha Urb.

Species of flowering plant

Pouteria micrantha is a species of flowering plant in the family Sapotaceae. It is a tree endemic to the Lomas de Cuaba and Sierra de Nipe in eastern Cuba.

The species was first described as Labatia micrantha by Ignatz Urban in 1925. In 1942 Charles Baehni placed the species in genus Pouteria as Pouteria micrantha.
