= Pouteria izabalensis =

Conservation status
- Near Threatened (IUCN 2.3)

Scientific classification
- Kingdom: Plantae
- Clade: Tracheophytes
- Clade: Angiosperms
- Clade: Eudicots
- Clade: Asterids
- Order: Ericales
- Family: Sapotaceae
- Genus: Pouteria
- Species: P. izabalensis

Binomial name
- Pouteria izabalensis (Standl.) Baehni

Species of flowering plant

Pouteria izabalensis is a species of plant in the family Sapotaceae. It is found in Belize, Guatemala, Honduras, and Nicaragua.
