= Placodiscus bancoensis =

Conservation status
- Vulnerable (IUCN 2.3)

Scientific classification
- Kingdom: Plantae
- Clade: Tracheophytes
- Clade: Angiosperms
- Clade: Eudicots
- Clade: Rosids
- Order: Sapindales
- Family: Sapindaceae
- Genus: Placodiscus
- Species: P. bancoensis

Binomial name
- Placodiscus bancoensis Aubrév. & Pellegr.

Species of flowering plant

Placodiscus bancoensis is a species of plant in the family Sapindaceae. It is found in Ivory Coast and Ghana. It is threatened by habitat loss.

It was first described by André Aubréville and François Pellegrin in 1936.
