= Pouteria cinnamomea =

Conservation status
- Critically Endangered (IUCN 2.3)

Scientific classification
- Kingdom: Plantae
- Clade: Tracheophytes
- Clade: Angiosperms
- Clade: Eudicots
- Clade: Asterids
- Order: Ericales
- Family: Sapotaceae
- Genus: Pouteria
- Species: P. cinnamomea

Binomial name
- Pouteria cinnamomea (Diels) Baehni

Species of tree

Pouteria cinnamomea is a species of plant in the family Sapotaceae. It is endemic to Peru.
