= Pouteria tarapotensis =

Conservation status
- Near Threatened (IUCN 2.3)

Scientific classification
- Kingdom: Plantae
- Clade: Tracheophytes
- Clade: Angiosperms
- Clade: Eudicots
- Clade: Asterids
- Order: Ericales
- Family: Sapotaceae
- Genus: Pouteria
- Species: P. tarapotensis

Binomial name
- Pouteria tarapotensis (Eichler ex Pierre) Baehni

Species of tree

Pouteria tarapotensis (Eichler ex Pierre) Baehni is a tree species in the family Sapotaceae. It is endemic to Peru and Bolivia, and is listed as Lower Risk/near threatened (LR/nt) on the IUCN Red List (IUCN 2.3).
