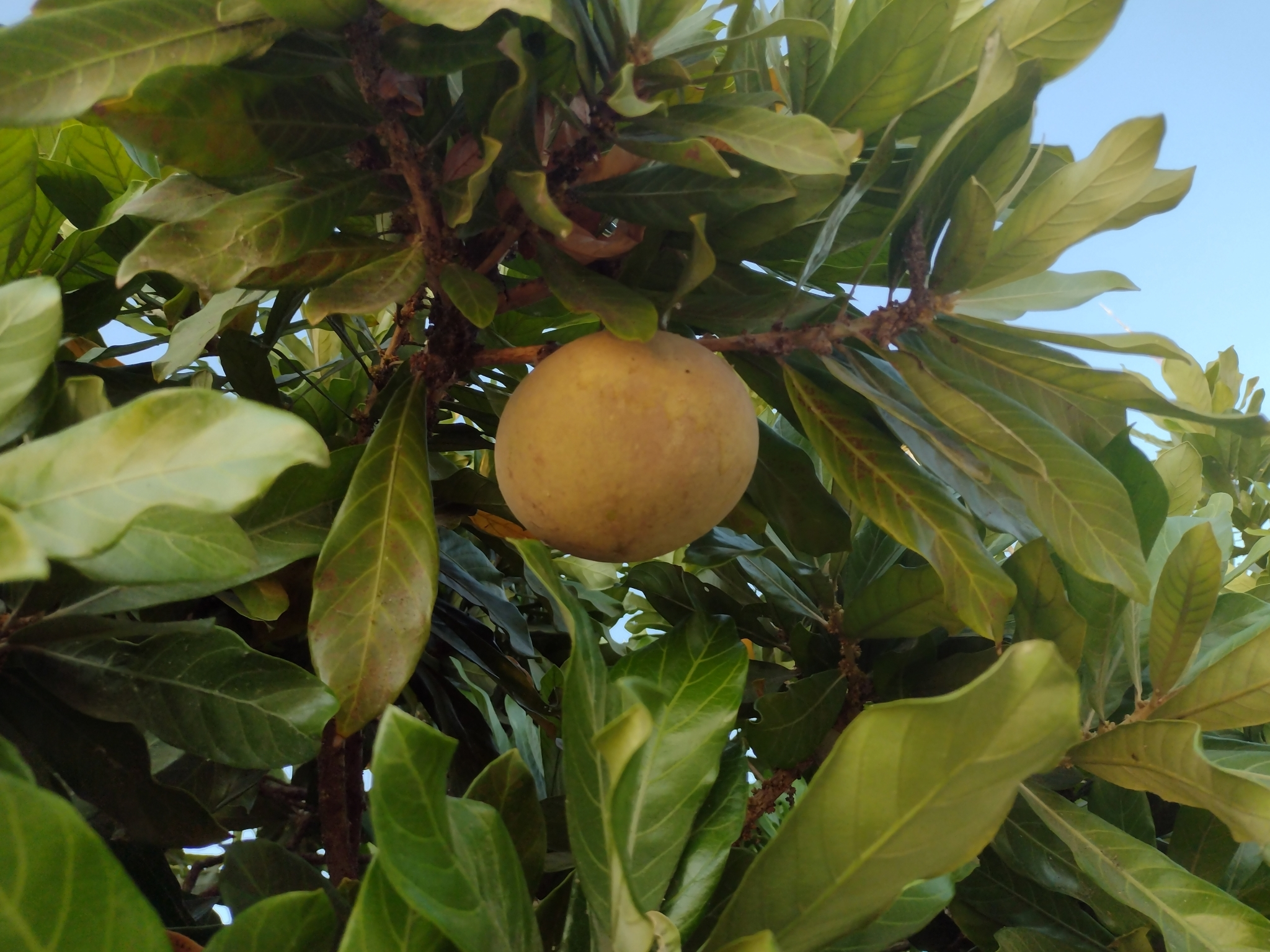
- Pouteria glomerata subsp. glomerata

Scientific classification
- Kingdom: Plantae
- Clade: Tracheophytes
- Clade: Angiosperms
- Clade: Eudicots
- Clade: Asterids
- Order: Ericales
- Family: Sapotaceae
- Genus: Pouteria
- Species: P. glomerata

Binomial name
- Pouteria glomerata (Miq.) Radlk.

= Pouteria glomerata =

Species of flowering plant

Pouteria glomerata is a species of plant in the family Sapotaceae. It is distributed from Mexico to North-East Argentina. Its greatest presence is in Brazil, where it is known as abiurana-do-igapó (wetland abiurana). Mature fruit has a smooth and yellow pericarp, with four ovary locules. The subspecies Pouteria glomerata subsp. stylosa is endemic to the Amazon Basin, where it is called abiurana-roxa (purple abiurana). The subspecies Pouteria glomerata subsp. glomerata, formerly known as Pouteria hypoglauca, is native to Central America, and an edible fruit (called cinnamon apple), grown in Florida.
