= Placodiscus oblongifolius =

Conservation status
- Vulnerable (IUCN 2.3)

Scientific classification
- Kingdom: Plantae
- Clade: Tracheophytes
- Clade: Angiosperms
- Clade: Eudicots
- Clade: Rosids
- Order: Sapindales
- Family: Sapindaceae
- Genus: Placodiscus
- Species: P. oblongifolius

Binomial name
- Placodiscus oblongifolius J.B.Hall

Species of tree

Placodiscus oblongifolius is a forest tree in the family Sapindaceae. It is endemic to lowland rain forests of West Africa, with the best studied populations in Ghana.
