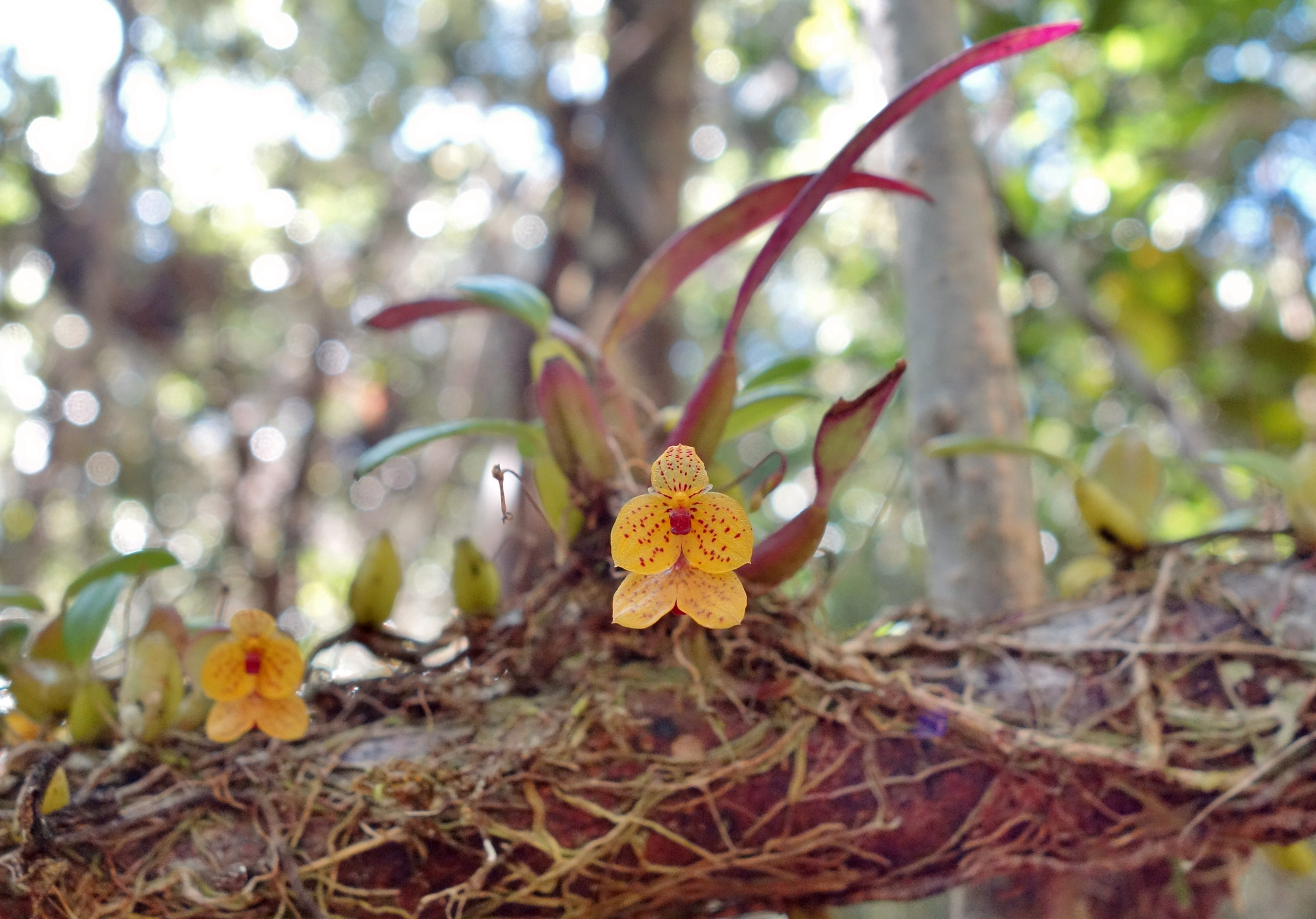

Conservation status
- Near Threatened (IUCN 3.1)

Scientific classification
- Kingdom: Plantae
- Clade: Tracheophytes
- Clade: Angiosperms
- Clade: Monocots
- Order: Asparagales
- Family: Orchidaceae
- Subfamily: Epidendroideae
- Genus: Bulbophyllum
- Section: Bulbophyllum sect. Elasmotopus
- Species: B. analamazoatrae

Binomial name
- Bulbophyllum analamazoatrae Schltr.

= Bulbophyllum analamazoatrae =

Species of orchid

Bulbophyllum analamazoatrae is a species of orchid in the genus Bulbophyllum found in Madagascar.

== Distribution ==
Plants are found growing in Madagascar east of High Plateau rainforest between 200 and 1,300 meters growing in the humid forest.
