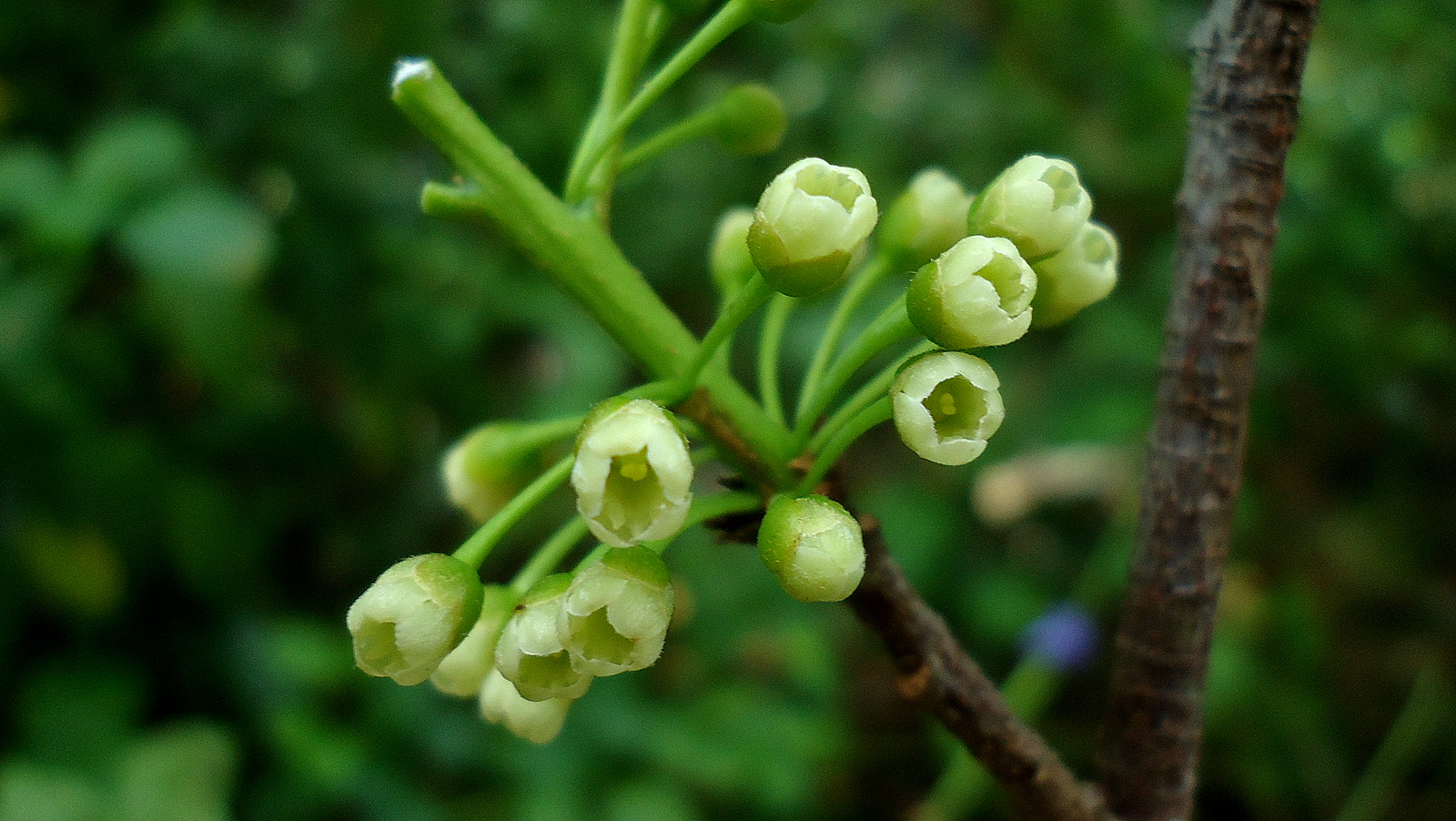

Conservation status
- Data Deficient (IUCN 2.3)

Scientific classification
- Kingdom: Plantae
- Clade: Tracheophytes
- Clade: Angiosperms
- Clade: Eudicots
- Clade: Asterids
- Order: Ericales
- Family: Sapotaceae
- Genus: Pouteria
- Species: P. gardneri

Binomial name
- Pouteria gardneri (Mart. & Eichler) Baehni (1942)

Synonyms
- Chrysophyllum gardneri Mart. & Eichler (1863); Discoluma gardneri (Mart. & Eichler) Baill. (1891); Lucuma catocladantha Eichler (1870); Lucuma gardneri (Mart. & Eichler) Engl. (1897); Lucuma paraguariensis Chodat & Hassl. (1907); Lucuma paraguariensis f. fruticosa Chodat & Hassl. (1907); Lucuma peduncularis Mart. & Eichler (1863); Podoluma gardneri (Mart. & Eichler) Aubrév. (1962); Podoluma peduncularis (Mart. & Eichler) Aubrév. (1962); Pouteria catocladantha (Eichler) Baehni (1942); Pouteria peduncularis (Mart. & Eichler) Baehni (1942); Vitellaria catocladantha (Eichler) Engl. (1890)

= Pouteria gardneri =

Species of flowering plant

Pouteria gardneri is a species of plant in the family Sapotaceae. It is a tree native to Brazil, Bolivia, and Paraguay. Its conservation status is insufficiently known.
