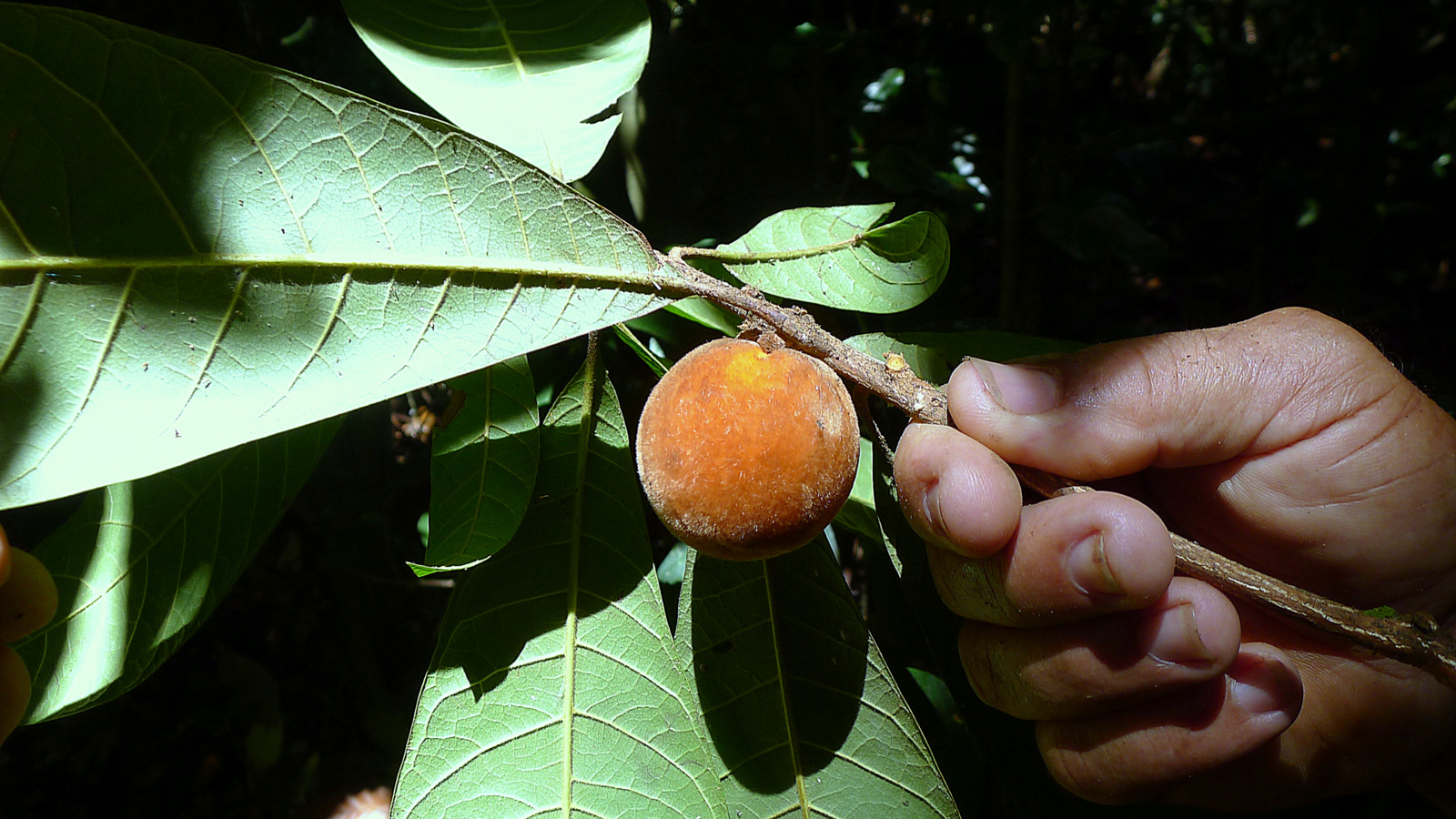

Conservation status
- Endangered (IUCN 2.3)

Scientific classification
- Kingdom: Plantae
- Clade: Tracheophytes
- Clade: Angiosperms
- Clade: Eudicots
- Clade: Asterids
- Order: Ericales
- Family: Sapotaceae
- Genus: Pouteria
- Species: P. macahensis

Binomial name
- Pouteria macahensis T.D.Penn.

= Pouteria macahensis =

Species of tree

Pouteria macahensis is a species of plant in the family Sapotaceae. The tree is endemic to the Atlantic Forest ecoregion in southeastern Brazil. It is threatened by habitat loss.
