= Pouteria semecarpifolia =

Conservation status
- Vulnerable (IUCN 2.3)

Scientific classification
- Kingdom: Plantae
- Clade: Tracheophytes
- Clade: Angiosperms
- Clade: Eudicots
- Clade: Asterids
- Order: Ericales
- Family: Sapotaceae
- Genus: Pouteria
- Species: P. semecarpifolia

Binomial name
- Pouteria semecarpifolia (Pierre ex Duss) Dubard

Species of flowering plant

Pouteria semecarpifolia is a species of plant in the family Sapotaceae. It is found in Dominica, Guadeloupe, Martinique, Saint Lucia, and Saint Vincent and the Grenadines.
