= Lucuma trigonosperma =

Conservation status
- Least Concern (IUCN 2.3)

Scientific classification
- Kingdom: Plantae
- Clade: Tracheophytes
- Clade: Angiosperms
- Clade: Eudicots
- Clade: Asterids
- Order: Ericales
- Family: Sapotaceae
- Genus: Lucuma
- Species: L. trigonosperma

Binomial name
- Lucuma trigonosperma (Eyma) Swenson

Synonyms
- Pouteria trigonospedrma Eyma; Radlkoferella trigonosperma (Eyma) Aubrév.; Richardella trigonosperma (Eyma) Baehni

Species of flowering plant

Lucuma trigonosperma is a species of flowering plant in the family Sapotaceae. It is a tree native to Guyana and Suriname.
