= Pouteria bapeba =

Conservation status
- Vulnerable (IUCN 2.3)

Scientific classification
- Kingdom: Plantae
- Clade: Tracheophytes
- Clade: Angiosperms
- Clade: Eudicots
- Clade: Asterids
- Order: Ericales
- Family: Sapotaceae
- Genus: Pouteria
- Species: P. bapeba

Binomial name
- Pouteria bapeba T.D.Penn.

Species of flowering plant

Pouteria bapeba is a species of plant in the family Sapotaceae. It is endemic to Brazil. It is threatened by habitat loss. It is found in the states of Alagoas, Paraiba, and Pernambuco. The further exploitation of Pouteria bapeba and other plants in Brazil will decrease biodiversity and negatively affect climate change.
