= Pouteria juruana =

Conservation status
- Endangered (IUCN 2.3)

Scientific classification
- Kingdom: Plantae
- Clade: Tracheophytes
- Clade: Angiosperms
- Clade: Eudicots
- Clade: Asterids
- Order: Ericales
- Family: Sapotaceae
- Genus: Pouteria
- Species: P. juruana

Binomial name
- Pouteria juruana K.Krause

Species of tree

Pouteria juruana is a species of tree in the family Sapotaceae. It is native to North and South America.

== Conservation ==
Pouteria juruana is considered an endangered species by the IUCN.
