= Pouteria rufotomentosa =

Conservation status
- Endangered (IUCN 3.1)

Scientific classification
- Kingdom: Plantae
- Clade: Tracheophytes
- Clade: Angiosperms
- Clade: Eudicots
- Clade: Asterids
- Order: Ericales
- Family: Sapotaceae
- Genus: Pouteria
- Species: P. rufotomentosa

Binomial name
- Pouteria rufotomentosa (Lundell) T.D.Penn.

Synonyms
- Peteniodendron rufotomentosum Lundell

Species of flowering plant

Pouteria rufotomentosa is a species of flowering plant in the family Sapotaceae. It is native to Guatemala and Southwest Mexico.
