= Peteniodendron virescens =

Conservation status
- Least Concern (IUCN 3.1)

Scientific classification
- Kingdom: Plantae
- Clade: Tracheophytes
- Clade: Angiosperms
- Clade: Eudicots
- Clade: Asterids
- Order: Ericales
- Family: Sapotaceae
- Genus: Peteniodendron
- Species: P. virescens

Binomial name
- Peteniodendron virescens (Baehni) Swenson

Synonyms
- Pouteria virescens Baehni

Species of flowering plant

Peteniodendron virescens is a species of flowering plant in the family Sapotaceae. It is a tree native to northern Brazil (Amazonas state), French Guiana, and Guyana, where it is commonly known as abiurana. It grows up to 30 meters tall in lowland Amazon rainforest.
