= Pouteria brevipetiolata =

Conservation status
- Endangered (IUCN 3.1)

Scientific classification
- Kingdom: Plantae
- Clade: Tracheophytes
- Clade: Angiosperms
- Clade: Eudicots
- Clade: Asterids
- Order: Ericales
- Family: Sapotaceae
- Genus: Pouteria
- Species: P. brevipetiolata

Binomial name
- Pouteria brevipetiolata T.D.Penn.

Species of flowering plant

Pouteria brevipetiolata is a species of plant in the family Sapotaceae. It is endemic to Ecuador.
