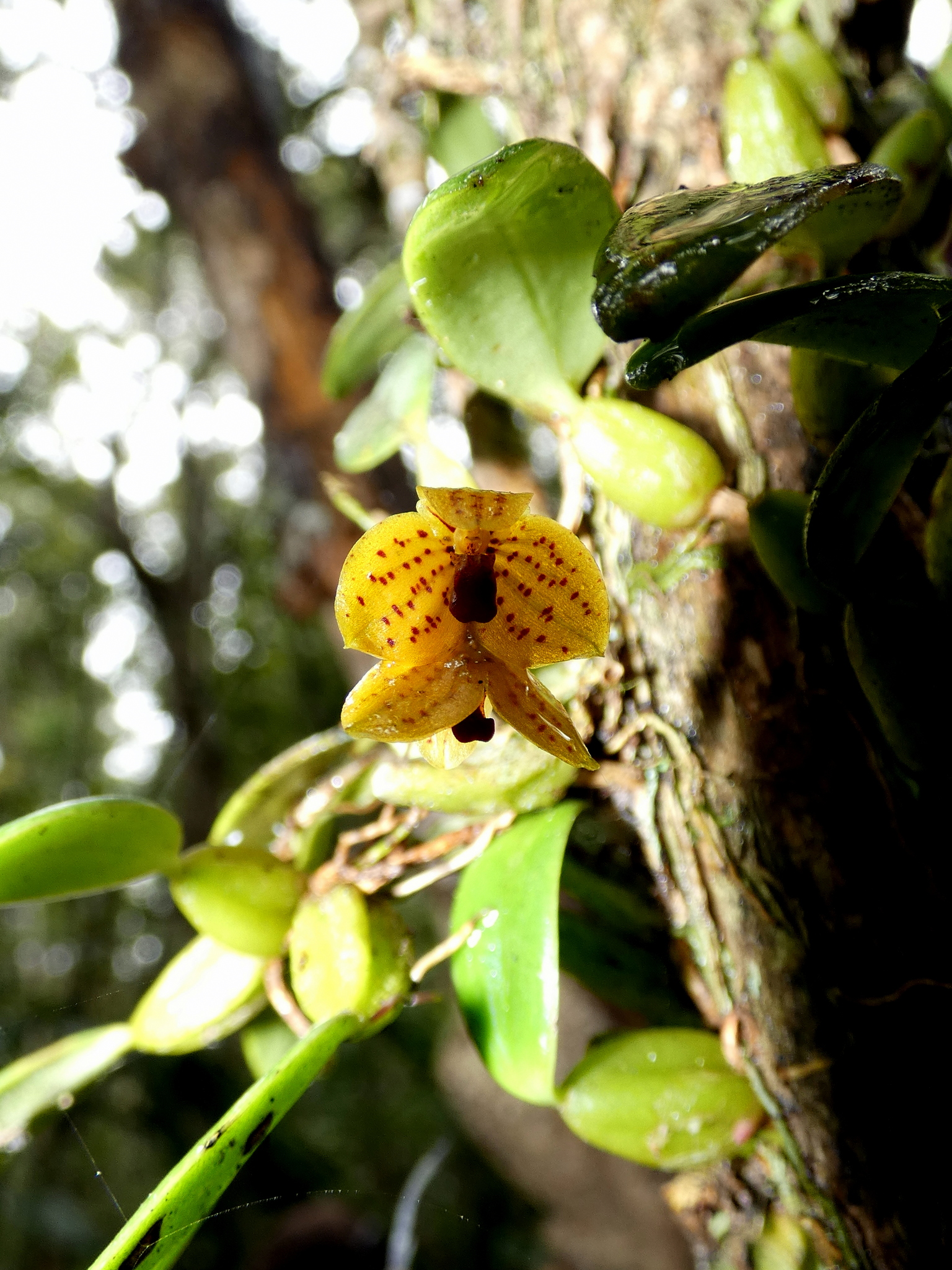
- Bulbophyllum analamazoatrae

Scientific classification
- Kingdom: Plantae
- Clade: Tracheophytes
- Clade: Angiosperms
- Clade: Monocots
- Order: Asparagales
- Family: Orchidaceae
- Subfamily: Epidendroideae
- Genus: Bulbophyllum
- Section: Bulbophyllum sect. Elasmotopus; Schlechter 1925

Type species
- Bulbophyllum oxycalyx

Species
- See text

Synonyms
- Bulbophyllum sect. Hymenosepalum

= Bulbophyllum sect. Elasmotopus =

Section of flowering plants

Bulbophyllum sect. Elasmotopus is a section of the genus Bulbophyllum.

== Description ==
Species in this section are epiphytes or lithophytes. Plants have one to many flowers arraigned spirally. Sepals free usually with 3 veins.

== Distribution ==
Plants from this section are found in Madagascar.

== Species ==
Bulbophyllum section Elasmotopus comprises the following species:

| Image | Name | Distribution | Elevation (m) |
|---|---|---|---|
| | Bulbophyllum amphorimorphum H.Perrier 1951 | Madagascar | 1,400 metres (4,600 ft) |
| | Bulbophyllum analamazoatrae Schltr. 1924 | Madagascar | 400–1,000 metres (1,300–3,300 ft) |
| | Bulbophyllum aubrevillei Bosser 1965 | Madagascar | 500–1,200 metres (1,600–3,900 ft) |
| | Bulbophyllum fierenanaense G.A.Fisch & Hermans 2021 | Madagascar (Toamasina) | 1,128–1,264 metres (3,701–4,147 ft) |
| | Bulbophyllum francoisii H.Perrier 1937 | Madagascar | 0–1,400 metres (0–4,593 ft) |
| | Bulbophyllum oxycalyx Schltr. 1924 | Madagascar | 1,100–2,500 metres (3,600–8,200 ft) |
| | Bulbophyllum pandurella Schltr. 1924 | Madagascar | 1,100–2,000 metres (3,600–6,600 ft) |
| | Bulbophyllum rauhii Toill. -Gen. & Bosser 1959 | Madagascar | |
