= Pouteria macrocarpa =

Conservation status
- Vulnerable (IUCN 2.3)

Scientific classification
- Kingdom: Plantae
- Clade: Tracheophytes
- Clade: Angiosperms
- Clade: Eudicots
- Clade: Asterids
- Order: Ericales
- Family: Sapotaceae
- Genus: Pouteria
- Species: P. macrocarpa

Binomial name
- Pouteria macrocarpa (Mart.) D.Dietr.

Species of flowering plant

Pouteria macrocarpa is a species of plant in the family Sapotaceae. It is found in Brazil, Colombia, and Costa Rica.
