= Placodiscus paniculatus =

Conservation status
- Critically Endangered (IUCN 3.1)

Scientific classification
- Kingdom: Plantae
- Clade: Tracheophytes
- Clade: Angiosperms
- Clade: Eudicots
- Clade: Rosids
- Order: Sapindales
- Family: Sapindaceae
- Genus: Placodiscus
- Species: P. paniculatus

Binomial name
- Placodiscus paniculatus Hauman

Species of flowering plant

Placodiscus paniculatus is a species of plant in the family Sapindaceae. It is endemic to the Democratic Republic of the Congo.
