= Pouteria polysepala =

Conservation status
- Critically Endangered (IUCN 2.3)

Scientific classification
- Kingdom: Plantae
- Clade: Tracheophytes
- Clade: Angiosperms
- Clade: Eudicots
- Clade: Asterids
- Order: Ericales
- Family: Sapotaceae
- Genus: Pouteria
- Species: P. polysepala

Binomial name
- Pouteria polysepala T.D.Penn.

Synonyms
- Calocarpum odoratum Ducke

Species of flowering plant

Pouteria polysepala is a rare species of plant in the family Sapotaceae. It is a tree native to the western Amazon Basin of northwestern Brazil and adjacent Ecuador, Peru, and Bolivia, and to northwestern Ecuador. It is threatened by habitat loss and is considered Critically Endangered (CR). It is known to reside only upon large trees in a forest that is not experiencing heavy flooding. In the 1998 IUCN Red List assessment the only known occurrence of Pouteria polysepala is at the mouth of the Javari River in the Brazilian state of Amazonas. As of March 2026 the GBIF has 23 georeferenced records covering a larger area across several countries.
