= Placodiscus attenuatus =

Conservation status
- Endangered (IUCN 2.3)

Scientific classification
- Kingdom: Plantae
- Clade: Tracheophytes
- Clade: Angiosperms
- Clade: Eudicots
- Clade: Rosids
- Order: Sapindales
- Family: Sapindaceae
- Genus: Placodiscus
- Species: P. attenuatus

Binomial name
- Placodiscus attenuatus J.B.Hall

Species of flowering plant

Placodiscus attenuatus is a species of plant in the family Sapindaceae. It is found in Ivory Coast and Ghana. It is threatened by habitat loss.
