= Pouteria andarahiensis =

Conservation status
- Endangered (IUCN 2.3)

Scientific classification
- Kingdom: Plantae
- Clade: Tracheophytes
- Clade: Angiosperms
- Clade: Eudicots
- Clade: Asterids
- Order: Ericales
- Family: Sapotaceae
- Genus: Pouteria
- Species: P. andarahiensis

Binomial name
- Pouteria andarahiensis T.D.Penn.

Species of flowering plant

Pouteria andarahiensis is a species of plant in the family Sapotaceae. It is endemic to Brazil. It is threatened by habitat loss.
