= Placodiscus =

Scientific classification
- Kingdom: Plantae
- Clade: Tracheophytes
- Clade: Angiosperms
- Clade: Eudicots
- Clade: Rosids
- Order: Sapindales
- Family: Sapindaceae
- Tribe: Nephelieae
- Genus: Placodiscus; Radlk.

Genus of flowering plants

Placodiscus is a genus of plant in family Sapindaceae. The following species are accepted by Plants of the World Online:

- Placodiscus amaniensis Radlk.
- Placodiscus angustifolius Radlk. ex Engl.
- Placodiscus attenuatus J.B.Hall
- Placodiscus bancoensis Aubrév. & Pellegr.
- Placodiscus boya Aubrév. & Pellegr.
- Placodiscus bracteosus J.B.Hall
- Placodiscus caudatus Pierre ex Pellegr.
- Placodiscus gimbiensis Hauman
- Placodiscus glandulosus Radlk.
- Placodiscus leptostachys Radlk.
- Placodiscus oblongifolius J.B.Hall
- Placodiscus opacus Radlk.
- Placodiscus paniculatus Hauman
- Placodiscus pedicellatus F.G.Davies
- Placodiscus pseudostipularis Radlk.
- Placodiscus pynaertii De Wild.
- Placodiscus resendeanus Exell & Mendonça
- Placodiscus riparius Keay
- Placodiscus splendidus Keay
- Placodiscus turbinatus Radlk.
