= Placodiscus pseudostipularis =

Conservation status
- Endangered (IUCN 2.3)

Scientific classification
- Kingdom: Plantae
- Clade: Tracheophytes
- Clade: Angiosperms
- Clade: Eudicots
- Clade: Rosids
- Order: Sapindales
- Family: Sapindaceae
- Genus: Placodiscus
- Species: P. pseudostipularis

Binomial name
- Placodiscus pseudostipularis Radlk.

Species of flowering plant

Placodiscus pseudostipularis is a species of plant in the family Sapindaceae. It is found in Ivory Coast, Ghana, Liberia, and Sierra Leone. It is threatened by habitat loss.
