= Placodiscus caudatus =

Conservation status
- Endangered (IUCN 3.1)

Scientific classification
- Kingdom: Plantae
- Clade: Tracheophytes
- Clade: Angiosperms
- Clade: Eudicots
- Clade: Rosids
- Order: Sapindales
- Family: Sapindaceae
- Genus: Placodiscus
- Species: P. caudatus

Binomial name
- Placodiscus caudatus Pierre ex Pellegr.

Species of flowering plant

Placodiscus caudatus is a species of plant in the family Sapindaceae. It is found in Cameroon, Central African Republic, and Gabon. Its natural habitat is subtropical or tropical moist lowland forests. It is threatened by habitat loss.
