= Placodiscus opacus =

Conservation status
- Vulnerable (IUCN 3.1)

Scientific classification
- Kingdom: Plantae
- Clade: Tracheophytes
- Clade: Angiosperms
- Clade: Eudicots
- Clade: Rosids
- Order: Sapindales
- Family: Sapindaceae
- Genus: Placodiscus
- Species: P. opacus

Binomial name
- Placodiscus opacus Radlk.

Species of flowering plant

Placodiscus opacus is a species of plant in the family Sapindaceae. It is found in Cameroon, Central African Republic, Equatorial Guinea, and Gabon. Its natural habitat is subtropical or tropical moist lowland forests. It is threatened by habitat loss.
