= Pouteria fossicola =

Conservation status
- Vulnerable (IUCN 2.3)

Scientific classification
- Kingdom: Plantae
- Clade: Tracheophytes
- Clade: Angiosperms
- Clade: Eudicots
- Clade: Asterids
- Order: Ericales
- Family: Sapotaceae
- Genus: Pouteria
- Species: P. fossicola

Binomial name
- Pouteria fossicola Cronquist

Synonyms
- Calocarpum fossicola (Cronquist) Lundell; Grias megacarpa Dwyer; Calocarpum borucanum Standl. & L.O.Williams ex P.H.Allen

Species of flowering plant

Pouteria fossicola is a species of plant in the family Sapotaceae. It is found in Costa Rica and Panama.
