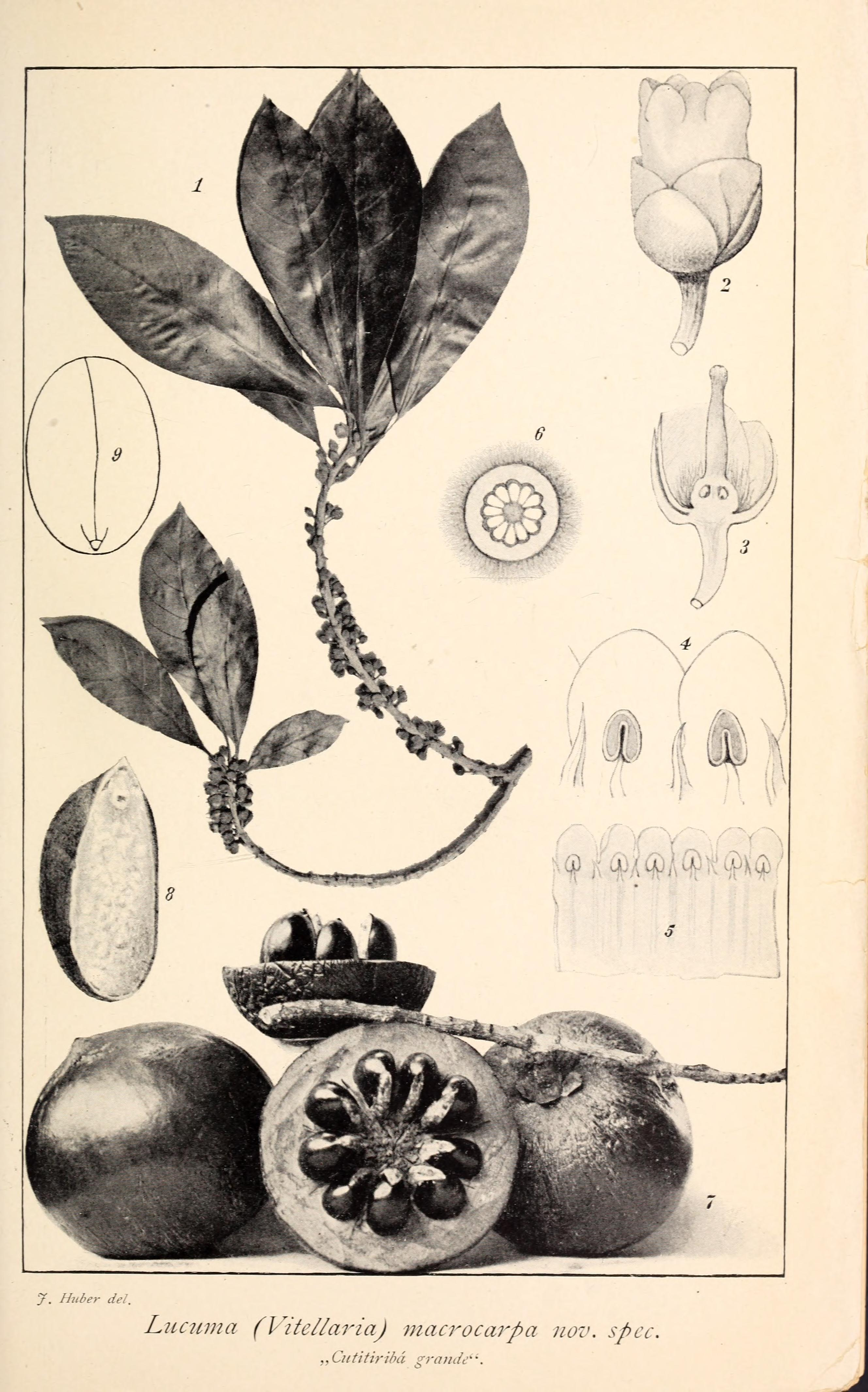

Conservation status
- Vulnerable (IUCN 2.3)

Scientific classification
- Kingdom: Plantae
- Clade: Tracheophytes
- Clade: Angiosperms
- Clade: Eudicots
- Clade: Asterids
- Order: Ericales
- Family: Sapotaceae
- Genus: Lucuma
- Species: L. multiflora

Binomial name
- Lucuma multiflora A.DC.

Synonyms
- Synonymy: Achras acana Sessé & Moc.; Lucuma dussiana Pierre ex Duss; Lucuma macrocarpa Huber; Lucuma martinicensis Pierre; Lucuma multiflora var. urbanii (Pierre) Dubard; Lucuma quadrifida Pierre; Lucuma stahliana Pierre; Lucuma urbanii Pierre; Pouteria carabobensis Pittier; Pouteria dussiana (Pierre ex Duss) Stehlé; Pouteria huberiana Rizzini; Pouteria macrocarpa (Huber) Ducke; Pouteria martinicensis (Pierre) Stehlé; Pouteria medicata García-Barr.; Pouteria multiflora (A.DC.) Eyma; Pouteria multiflora var. quadrifida (Pierre) Baehni; Pouteria multiflora var. urbanii (Pierre) Baehni; Pouteria multiflora var. tipica (A. DC.) Baehni, not validly publ.; Pouteria officinalis García-Barr.; Radlkoferella dussiana Pierre; Radlkoferella guadelupensis Pierre; Radlkoferella latifolia Fawc.; Radlkoferella macrocarpa (Huber) Aubrév.; Radlkoferella martinicensis Pierre; Radlkoferella multiflora (A.DC.) Pierre; Radlkoferella quadrifida Pierre; Radlkoferella urbanii Pierre; Sapota latifolia (Fawc.) Kuntze; Vitellaria multiflora (A.DC.) Radlk.

= Lucuma multiflora =

Species of tree

Lucuma multiflora is a plant in the family Sapotaceae of the order Ericales. Its English common name is bullytree. Its Spanish common names include jácana, ácana, acana, hacana, or jacana. It is native to North and South America. The plant is common in the Toro Negro State Forest.

It grows to 40–90 feet (12–27 m) in hight and 2–3 feet (0.61–0.91 m) in diameter. It yields very good timber that can be used for mill rollers, frames, furniture, and house building. Acana wood is light-colored, fine- and straight-grained, hard, very heavy, strong, and durable, and can be polished to a shine. The pores are small and arranged in radial rows, and the pith rays narrow and indistinct.

A similar definition of the acana tree is given by Constantino Suarez in his Diccionario de voces Cubanas, as a wild tree with a straight trunk that grows to 10 meters, with coriaceous rigid oval leaves, which produces a nutritious fruit smaller than the zapote, and whose wood is valued in Cuba for rustic houses and ship building because of the wood's durability and hardness, qualities enhanced by its sonority, weight, and beautiful reddish color.

== Acana in the arts ==
- Poem: "Song of the Acana Tree" (Spanish: Canto del Acana) by Minerva Salado
- Poem: "Acana" by Cuban writer Nicolás Guillén
- Music: "Acana", by Cuban composer Tania León
