= Pouteria scrobiculata =

Conservation status
- Least Concern (IUCN 2.3)

Scientific classification
- Kingdom: Plantae
- Clade: Tracheophytes
- Clade: Angiosperms
- Clade: Eudicots
- Clade: Asterids
- Order: Ericales
- Family: Sapotaceae
- Genus: Pouteria
- Species: P. scrobiculata

Binomial name
- Pouteria scrobiculata Monach. ex T.D.Penn.

Species of flowering plant

Pouteria scrobiculata is a species of plant in the family Sapotaceae. It is found in Brazil and Venezuela.
