= Bulbophyllum rauhii =

Scientific classification
- Kingdom: Plantae
- Clade: Tracheophytes
- Clade: Angiosperms
- Clade: Monocots
- Order: Asparagales
- Family: Orchidaceae
- Subfamily: Epidendroideae
- Genus: Bulbophyllum
- Section: Bulbophyllum sect. Elasmotopus
- Species: B. rauhii

Binomial name
- Bulbophyllum rauhii Toill. -Gen. & Bosser

Species of orchid

Bulbophyllum rauhii is a species of orchid in the genus Bulbophyllum found in Madagascar.
