= Aubrevillea =

Scientific classification
- Kingdom: Plantae
- Clade: Tracheophytes
- Clade: Angiosperms
- Clade: Eudicots
- Clade: Rosids
- Order: Fabales
- Family: Fabaceae
- Subfamily: Caesalpinioideae
- Clade: Mimosoid clade
- Genus: Aubrevillea; Pellegr.

Species
- Aubrevillea kerstingii (Harms) Pellegr.; Aubrevillea platicarpa Pellegr.

Genus of legumes

Aubrevillea is a genus of flowering plants in the family Fabaceae. It belongs to the mimosoid clade of the subfamily Caesalpinioideae. It includes two species of trees native to west and central Africa, ranging from Senegal to Democratic Republic of the Congo.

- Aubrevillea kerstingii (Harms) Pellegr.
- Aubrevillea platicarpa Pellegr.
