= Peteniodendron pallens =

Conservation status
- Least Concern (IUCN 3.1)

Scientific classification
- Kingdom: Plantae
- Clade: Tracheophytes
- Clade: Angiosperms
- Clade: Eudicots
- Clade: Asterids
- Order: Ericales
- Family: Sapotaceae
- Subfamily: Chrysophylloideae
- Genus: Peteniodendron
- Species: P. pallens

Binomial name
- Peteniodendron pallens (T.D.Penn.) Swenson

Synonyms
- Pouteria pallens T.D.Penn.

Species of flowering plant

Peteniodendron pallens is a species of flowering plant in the family Sapotaceae. It is a tree endemic to Rondônia state in northern Brazil. It grows up to 20 meters tall in lowland terre firme (non-flooded) Amazon rainforest.
