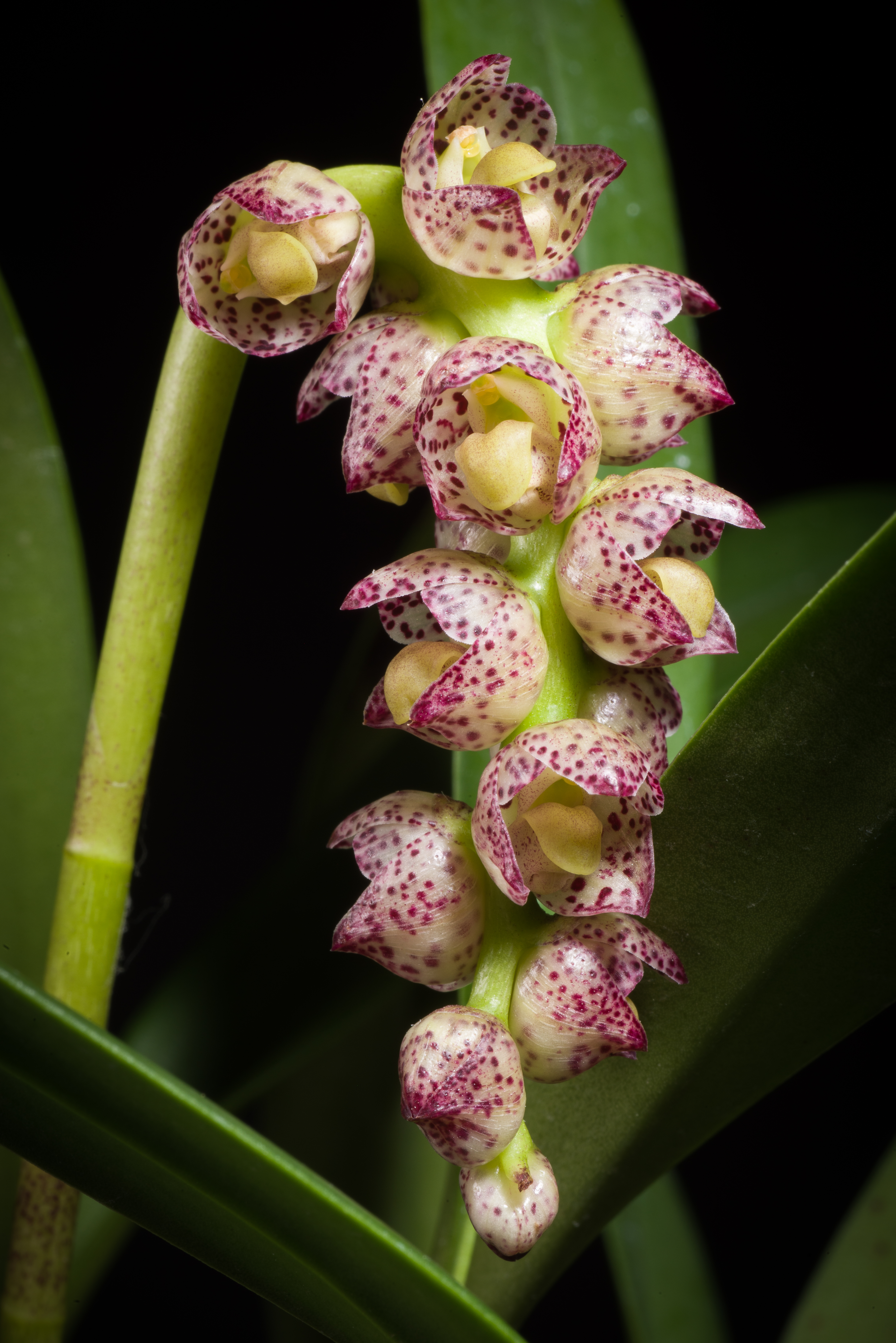

Scientific classification
- Kingdom: Plantae
- Clade: Tracheophytes
- Clade: Angiosperms
- Clade: Monocots
- Order: Asparagales
- Family: Orchidaceae
- Subfamily: Epidendroideae
- Genus: Bulbophyllum
- Section: Bulbophyllum sect. Elasmotopus
- Species: B. aubrevillei

Binomial name
- Bulbophyllum aubrevillei Bosser

Synonyms
- Bulbophyllum kieneri Bosser 1971

= Bulbophyllum aubrevillei =

Species of orchid

Bulbophyllum aubrevillei is a species of orchid in the genus Bulbophyllum found in Madagascar.
