= Aubrevillea kerstingii =

Scientific classification
- Kingdom: Plantae
- Clade: Tracheophytes
- Clade: Angiosperms
- Clade: Eudicots
- Clade: Rosids
- Order: Fabales
- Family: Fabaceae
- Subfamily: Caesalpinioideae
- Clade: Mimosoid clade
- Genus: Aubrevillea
- Species: A. kerstingii

Binomial name
- Aubrevillea kerstingii (Harms) Pellegr.

Synonyms
- Piptadenia kerstingii Harms

Species of tree

Aubrevillea kerstingii is a large tree within the Fabaceae family. It occurs in semi-deciduous forests, gallery forests and also found in the savannah woodland zones of West and Central Africa.

== Description ==
The species is a large tree that grows up to 35 meters in height with a long straight trunk and plank like buttresses spreading up to 3 meters from the trunk; its bark is reddish brown and scaly Leaves are bipinnately compound, 6-8 pairs of pinnae consisting of 20-30 pairs of leaflets per pinnae; leaflets are up to 2 cm long and 4 cm wide and are glabrous at maturity, they are oblong in outline and pointed at the top. Inflorescence is raceme like, fruit is an indehiscent and membranous pod that is oblong in shape, up to 16 mm in length.
