= Peteniodendron =

Scientific classification
- Kingdom: Plantae
- Clade: Tracheophytes
- Clade: Angiosperms
- Clade: Eudicots
- Clade: Asterids
- Order: Ericales
- Family: Sapotaceae
- Subfamily: Chrysophylloideae
- Genus: Peteniodendron; Lundell

Genus of flowering plants

Peteniodendron is a genus of flowering plants in the family Sapotaceae. It includes four species native to the tropical Americas, ranging from northeastern Mexico through Central America and northern South America to Bolivia and southern Brazil.

- Peteniodendron durlandii (Standl.) Lundell – Mexico, Central America, northern and western South America, and eastern and southern Brazil
- Peteniodendron jariense (Pires & T.D.Penn.) Swenson – French Guiana and northern Brazil
- Peteniodendron pallens (T.D.Penn.) Swenson – northern Brazil (Rondônia)
- Peteniodendron virescens (Baehni) Swenson – Guyana, French Guiana, and northern Brazil (Amazonas)
