= Englerella =

Scientific classification
- Kingdom: Plantae
- Clade: Tracheophytes
- Clade: Angiosperms
- Clade: Eudicots
- Clade: Asterids
- Order: Ericales
- Family: Sapotaceae
- Genus: Englerella; Pierre
- Species: E. macrocarpa

Binomial name
- Englerella macrocarpa Pierre

Synonyms
- Englerella speciosa (Ducke) Ducke; Lucuma speciosa Ducke; Pouteria speciosa (Ducke) Baehni; Richardella speciosa (Ducke) Aubrév.

Genus of flowering plants

Englerella macrocarpa is a species of flowering plant in the family Sapotaceae. It is the sole species in genus Englerella. It is a tree native to Colombia, northern Brazil, Guyana, and French Guiana.
