= Pierre Joseph Eyma =

Dutch botanist

- Born: 25 July 1903; Maarssen, Netherlands
- Died: 1945 (aged 41–42); Near Palembang, Sumatra, Dutch East Indies
- Education: Utrecht University
- Known for: Botanical research in the Dutch East Indies
- Scientific career
- Fields: Botany, taxonomy
- Workplaces: Utrecht University Herbarium; Herbarium Bogoriense
- Thesis: Taxonomic study of Surinamese plants (1932)
- Author abbrev. (botany): Eyma

Pierre Joseph Eyma (25 July 1903 – 1945) was a Dutch botanist.

Eyma was born in Maarssen, Netherlands, in 1903. He studied at Utrecht University and served as an assistant at the university's herbarium between 1929 and 1937. Eyma earned a doctorate in 1932 for a taxonomic thesis on Surinamese plants. He travelled to Java in 1937, and in the following years made numerous botanical expeditions throughout the Dutch East Indies. Beginning in 1940, Eyma worked as an assistant at Herbarium Bogoriense in Bogor, Java. He died in 1945 in a Japanese POW camp near Palembang, Sumatra.

A number of plant species have been named after him, including Eurya eymae, Nepenthes eymae, and Randia eymai.
