= André Aubréville =

French botanist (1897-1982)

- Born: 30 November 1897; Pont-Saint-Vincent
- Died: 11 August 1982 (aged 84); Paris
- Education: École Polytechnique; École nationale des eaux et forêts
- Scientific career
- Fields: Botany
- Workplaces: Muséum national d'histoire naturelle
- Author abbrev. (botany): Aubrév.

André Aubréville (30 November 1897, in Pont-Saint-Vincent (Meurthe-et-Moselle) – 11 August 1982, in Paris) was a French botanist, professor at the National Museum of Natural History in Paris and a member of the Academy of Sciences. He was the first scientist to introduce the term "desertification" (in his 1949 book: Climats, forêts et désertification de l'Afrique tropicale (Climates, Forests, and Desertification of Tropical Africa), and wrote a number of floras of former French colonies.

== Biography ==
Following his service (as a youth) in the First World War, André Aubréville entered the École Polytechnique (promotion 20 "special") and obtained an engineering degree in 1922. Attracted by the botany of tropical forests, he then studied at the École nationale des eaux et forêts in Nancy, graduating as Ingénieur des Eaux et Forêts des Colonies (Engineer of Waters and Forests of the Colonies) in 1924. Appointed to the Côte d'Ivoire in 1925, he wrote La Forêt coloniale. Les forêts de l'Afrique occidentale française in 1938 which was not only a treatise on tropical sylviculture but a tract on the politics of forestry. In 1938, following this important publication, he was appointed Inspector General of waters and forests for Afrique Occidentale Française (A.O.F.) - French West Africa.

His publications on tropical Africa are widely recognized for their comprehensive approach to the subject: which include, in addition to the scientific treatment, practical aspects such as forest management, and anthropogenic factors. In parallel with his position in the Forest Services, he served as president of the Société botanique de France in 1951–1952.

In 1955, retired from his position as Inspector General, he was appointed professor at the Muséum national d'histoire naturelle in 1958, thus beginning a second career as holder of the chair of Phanerogamy following Jean-Henri Humbert. At this time, the botanical publications at the Museum were in a transition period: one of the major series had ended, the General Flora of Indochina by Paul Henri Lecomte, and human resources had been reduced. None-the-less, André Aubréville wished to provide French-speaking overseas territories (colonies or former colonies) with excellent encyclopedic Floras. After ensuring the continuation of the Flora of Madagascar and the Comoros, he launched four major botanical projects. He revived the General Flora of Indochina in the form of Flore du Cambodge, du Laos et du Vietnam. He directed work on Flore du Gabon (Flora of Gabon) and Flore du Cameroun (Flora of Cameroun), along the lines of his previous flora of tropical Africa, and finally, he initiated another major series: Flore de la Nouvelle-Calédonie et dépendances (Flora of New Caledonia and Dependencies), of which he wrote the first volume concerning the family Sapotaceae. Work on these five large flora was later managed by his successors Jean-François Leroy and Philippe Morat, and they are still being published (in 2015).

He was elected a member of the French Academy of Sciences in 1968.

== Selected publications ==
- André Aubréville, La Forêt coloniale. Les forêts de l'Afrique occidentale française, Paris, Société d'éditions géographiques, maritimes et coloniales, 1938
- André Aubréville (3 vol.), Flore forestière de la Côte d'Ivoire, Paris, Larose, 1936
- André Aubréville, Climats, forêts et désertification de l'Afrique tropicale, Paris, Société d’éditions géographiques, maritimes et coloniales, 1949, 351 p.
- André Aubréville, Flore forestière soudano-guinéenne : A.O.F. - Cameroun - A.E.F, Paris, Société d’éditions géographiques, maritimes et coloniales, 1949, 523 p.
- André Aubréville (dir.) et al. (35 vol., en cours de parution), Flore du Cambodge, du Laos et du Vietnam : supplément à la Flore générale de l'Indochine de H. Lecomte, Paris, Muséum national d'histoire naturelle, 1960
- André Aubréville (dir.) et al. (38 vol., en cours de parution), Flore du Gabon, Paris, Muséum national d'histoire naturelle, 1961
- André Aubréville (dir.) et al. (40 vol., en cours de parution), Flore du Cameroun, Paris, Muséum national d'histoire naturelle, 1963
- André Aubréville (dir.) et al. (26 vol., en cours de parution), Flore de la Nouvelle-Calédonie et dépendances, Paris, Muséum national d'histoire naturelle, 1967

== Taxa honouring him ==
The genus Aubrevillea Pellegr., in the family Fabaceae honours Aubréville. It is composed of two species: Aubrevillea kerstingii (Harms) Pellegr. and Aubrevillea platicarpa Pellegr.

Many other species are named for André Aubréville:

- Araliaceae
  - Polyscias aubrevillei (Bernardi) Bernardi (basionym : Sciadopanax aubrevillei Bernardi)
- Chrysobalanaceae
  - Maranthes aubrevillei (Pellegr.) Prance ex F.White(basionym : Parinari aubrevillei Pellegr.)
- Crassulaceae
  - Kalanchoe aubrevillei Raym.-Hamet ex Cufod.
- Euphorbiaceae
  - Bridelia aubrevillei Pellegr.
  - Croton aubrevillei J.Léonard
  - Drypetes aubrevillei Leandri
  - Shirakiopsis aubrevillei (Leandri) Esser (basionym: Sapium aubrevillei Leandri)
- Flacourtiaceae
  - Homalium aubrevillei Keay
- Fabaceae
  - Mimosoideae
    - Newtonia aubrevillei (Pellegr.) Keay (basionym: Piptadenia aubrevillei Pellegr.)
    - Calpocalyx aubrevillei Pellegr.
  - Caesalpinioideae
    - Cassia aubrevillei Pellegr.
    - Dialium aubrevillei Pellegr.
    - Hymenostegia aubrevillei Pellegr.
    - Hymenostegia neoaubrevillei J.Léonard (replacement name for Cynometra aubrevillei Pellegr.
- Meliaceae
  - Swietenia aubrevilleana Stehlé & Cusin
- Orchidaceae
  - Bulbophyllum aubrevillei Bosser
- Santalaceae
  - Okoubaka aubrevillei Pellegr. & Normand
- Sapotaceae
  - Manilkara aubrevillei Sillans
  - Pouteria aubrevillei Bernardi
  - Synsepalum aubrevillei (Pellegr.) Aubrév. & Pellegr. (basionym : Sideroxylon aubrevillei Pellegr.)
- Sterculiaceae
  - Pterygota aubrevillei Pellegr.
