= Charles Baehni =

Swiss botanist and anthropologist (1906–1964)

- Born: 21 August 1906; Geneva
- Died: 23 January 1964 (aged 57)
- Scientific career
- Fields: Botany

Charles Baehni (21 August 1906 – 23 January 1964) was a Swiss botanist who made important contributions to scientific knowledge in the botanical field.

== Biography ==
Professor Charles Baehni was born on 21 August 1906 in Geneva, Switzerland. He was educated at the University of Geneva, and was supervised by Professor Robert Chodat where in 1932 he was awarded the degree of Doctor of Science. That same year he was appointed as an assistant at the Conservatory and Botanical Garden of the City of Geneva. In 1934, he studied at the Botanical Garden of the Field Museum in Chicago, and while in the United States, he made many trips to various parts of the country and collected extensive botanical findings.

In 1941, he was appointed conservator of the Botanical Garden in Geneva. He served as the director of the Conservatory and Botanical Garden, in Geneva, Switzerland, for twenty years. He wrote more than one hundred scientific papers and his main interest was in the Sapotaceae. He also contributed to a number of other botanical families including the Ulmaceae, Lacistemaceae, and Violaceae.
