= List of Planchonella species =

This is a list of species in the plant genus Planchonella.

- Planchonella amieuana (Guillaumin) Aubrév. – New Caledonia (Col d'Amieu)
- Planchonella aneityensis (Guillaumin) H.J.Lam ex Royen – Vanuatu
- Planchonella annamensis Pierre ex Dubard – China (Guangxi and Hainan), Vietnam, and Cambodia
- Planchonella anteridifera (C.T.White & W.D.Francis ex Lane-Poole) H.J.Lam – eastern and southeastern New Guinea
- Planchonella arnhemica (F.Muell. ex Benth.) P.Royen – northern Western Australia and northern Northern Territory
- Planchonella asterocarpon (P.Royen) Swenson, Bartish & Munzinger – northeastern Queensland
- Planchonella australis (R.Br.) Pierre – eastern Queensland and New South Wales
- Planchonella baillonii (Zahlbr.) Dubard – east-central and southeastern New Caledonia
- Planchonella boninensis (Nakai) Masam. & Yanagih. – Ogasawara Islands
- Planchonella brevipes A.C.Sm. – Fiji (Vanua Levu: Mount Mbatini)
- Planchonella calcarea (Hosok.) P.Royen – Palau
- Planchonella cauliflora Munzinger & Swenson – New Caledonia (Mt. Do)
- Planchonella chartacea (F.Muell. ex Benth.) H.J.Lam – Malesia, Papuasia, eastern Australia, and southwestern Pacific
- Planchonella chrysophylloides ( H.J.Lam – eastern New Guinea
- Planchonella cinerea (Pancher ex Baill.) P.Royen – northwestern and southeastern New Caledonia
- Planchonella clemensii (Lecomte) P.Royen – Vietnam and Hainan
- Planchonella contermina Pierre ex Dubard – northwestern New Caledonia
- Planchonella costata (Endl.) Pierre – New Zealand's North Island and Norfolk Island
- Planchonella cotinifolia (A.DC.) Dubard – northern and eastern Queensland and northeastern New South Wales
- Planchonella crassinervia Dubard – New Caledonia
- Planchonella crenata Munzinger & Swenson – west-central New Caledonia
- Planchonella cyclopensis P.Royen – western New Guinea (Cyclops Mountains)
- Planchonella dothioensis (Aubrév.) Swenson, Bartish & Munzinger – New Caledonia
- Planchonella duclitan (Blanco) Bakh.f. – Taiwan (Lan Yü), Malesia, and New Guinea
- Planchonella eerwah (F.M.Bailey) P.Royen – southeastern Queensland
- Planchonella endlicheri (Montrouz.) Guillaumin – east-central and southeastern New Caledonia
- Planchonella ericiflora Munzinger & Swenson – southern New Caledonia
- Planchonella erringtonii Dubard – Peninsular Malaysia
- Planchonella euphlebia (F.Muell.) Francis – northeastern Queensland
- Planchonella forbesii (S.Moore) H.J.Lam – eastern New Guinea
- Planchonella garberi Christoph. – southwestern Pacific
- Planchonella garcinioides (K.Krause) Swenson – eastern New Guinea
- Planchonella glauca Swenson & Munzinger – northern New Caledonia
- Planchonella grandifolia (Wall.) Pierre – Bangladesh and Assam, eastern Indochina, and southern China (Yunnan)
- Planchonella guillauminii H.J.Lam – Solomon Islands and Vanuatu
- Planchonella kaalaensis Aubrév. – northwestern New Caledonia
- Planchonella kaernbachiana (Engl.) H.J.Lam – eastern New Guinea
- Planchonella kaniensis (K.Krause) H.J.Lam – eastern New Guinea
- Planchonella keyensis H.J.Lam – southeastern Maluku, New Guinea, and Solomon Islands
- Planchonella koumaciensis Aubrév. – northwestern New Caledonia
- Planchonella kuebiniensis Aubrév. – central and southeastern New Caledonia
- Planchonella laetevirens (Baill.) Pierre ex Dubard – southeastern New Caledonia
- Planchonella lamii P.Royen Timor, Maluku, and New Guinea
- Planchonella latihila Munzinger & Swenson – southeastern New Caledonia
- Planchonella lauracea (Baill.) Dubard – New Caledonia
- Planchonella leptostylidifolia Guillaumin – northwestern New Caledonia
- Planchonella lifuana (Baill.) Pierre ex Dubard – central New Caledonia
- Planchonella longipetiolata (King & Prain) H.J.Lam – Bangladesh, Andaman Islands, and Myanmar
- Planchonella luteocostata Munzinger & Swenson – western New Caledonia
- Planchonella maclayana (F.Muell.) Swenson – Borneo, Sulawesi, Maluku, New Guinea, and Solomon Islands
- Planchonella macrantha (Merr.) Swenson – Philippines, Maluku, and Sulawesi
- Planchonella maingayi (C.B.Clarke) P.Royen – Borneo, Sumatra, and Peninsular Malaysia
- Planchonella malaccensis (C.B.Clarke) Swenson – southern Thailand, Sumatra, Peninsular Malaysia, Sulawesi, and New Guinea
- Planchonella mandjeliana Munzinger & Swenson – northern New Caledonia
- Planchonella membranacea H.J.Lam – Fiji, Tonga, and Niue
- Planchonella menait (Vink) Swenson – northern New Guinea
- Planchonella micronesica (Kaneh.) Kaneh. ex H.J.Lam – Caroline Islands (Kosrae)
- Planchonella microphylla Pierre ex Dubard – southeastern New Caledonia
- Planchonella mindanaensis H.J.Lam – Borneo and Philippines
- Planchonella minutiflora Munzinger & Swenson – northwestern New Caledonia
- Planchonella myrsinifolia (F.Muell.) Swenson, Bartish & Munzinger – Queensland, New South Wales, and Lord Howe Island
  - Planchonella myrsinifolia subsp. howeana (F.Muell.) Jessup – Lord Howe Island
- Planchonella myrsinodendron (F.Muell.) Swenson, Bartish & Munzinger – Java to the Solomon Islands and northeastern Queensland
- Planchonella myrsinoides (A.Cunn. ex Benth.) S.T.Blake ex Francis – Queensland
- Planchonella nebulicola H.J.Lam – eastern New Guinea
- Planchonella obovata (R.Br.) Pierre – Seychelles through Malesia and New Guinea to the western Pacific
- Planchonella orkor (Vink) Swenson – northeastern New Guinea
- Planchonella papuanica Pierre ex Dubard – eastern New Guinea
- Planchonella paucinervia (Erlee) Swenson – Peninsular Malaysia and Sumatra
- Planchonella peekelii (K.Krause) H.J.Lam – Bismarck Archipelago
- Planchonella petaloides H.J.Lam – Maluku
- Planchonella pinifolia (Baill.) Dubard – New Caledonia
- Planchonella pohlmaniana (F.Muell.) Pierre ex Dubard – northern and eastern Queensland and northeastern New South Wales
- Planchonella polyneura (K.Krause) Swenson – eastern New Guinea
- Planchonella pomifera (Pierre ex Baill.) Dubard – western New Guinea
- Planchonella povilana Swenson & Munzinger – northeastern New Caledonia
- Planchonella pronyensis Guillaumin – southeastern New Caledonia
- Planchonella pullenii (Vink) Swenson – northeastern New Guinea
- Planchonella pyrulifera (A.Gray) H.J.Lam ex Royen – Fiji
- Planchonella reticulata (Baill.) Pierre ex Dubard – east-central New Caledonia
- Planchonella rheophytopsis P.Royen – central New Caledonia
- Planchonella ridsdalei (Vink) Swenson – Philippines (Mindoro)
- Planchonella roseoloba Munzinger & Swenson – north-central and central New Caledonia
- Planchonella rufocostata Munzinger & Swenson – northeastern New Caledonia
- Planchonella saligna S.Moore – west-central and northwestern New Caledonia
- Planchonella sandwicensis (A.Gray) Pierre – Hawaiian Islands
- Planchonella schlechteri (K.Krause) H.J.Lam – eastern New Guinea
- Planchonella serpentinicola Swenson & Munzinger – New Caledonia
- Planchonella sessilis A.C.Sm. & S.P.Darwin – Fiji (Viti Levu)
- Planchonella skottsbergii Guillaumin – southeastern New Caledonia
- Planchonella smithii (P.Royen) A.C.Sm. – Fiji
- Planchonella spathulata Pierre – Hawaiian Islands
- Planchonella spectabilis (Miq.) Dubard – Sumatra
- Planchonella sphaerocarpa (Baill.) Dubard – central and west-central New Caledonia
- Planchonella stellibacca (J.F.Maxwell) Swenson – Thailand and Borneo
- Planchonella sussu (Engl.) H.J.Lam – New Guinea
- Planchonella tahitensis (Nadeaud) Pierre ex Dubard – South Pacific (Vanuatu to Tuamotus)
- Planchonella tenuipes (K.Krause) H.J.Lam – eastern New Guinea
- Planchonella thiensis Aubrév. – New Caledonia
- Planchonella thyrsoidea C.T.White – northern New Guinea (Padaido Islands), Bismarck Archipelago, Solomon Islands
- Planchonella torricellensis (K.Schum.) H.J.Lam – Lesser Sunda Islands to Tuamotus
- Planchonella ulfii Munzinger – New Caledonia
- Planchonella umbonata (P.Royen) A.C.Sm. – Fiji
- Planchonella velutina (Elmer) H.J.Lam – Philippines
- Planchonella villamilii (Merr.) Swenson – Philippines (Luzon)
- Planchonella vitiensis Gillespie – Fiji
- Planchonella vrieseana (Pierre ex Burck) Dubard – Maluku
- Planchonella wakere (Pancher & Sebert) Pierre – southeastern New Caledonia
- Planchonella whitmorei (Vink) Swenson – Solomon Islands
- Planchonella xylocarpa (C.T.White) Swenson, Bartish & Munzinger – Papuasia and northern Queensland
- Planchonella yunnanensis C.Y.Wu – China (southeastern Yunnan)
