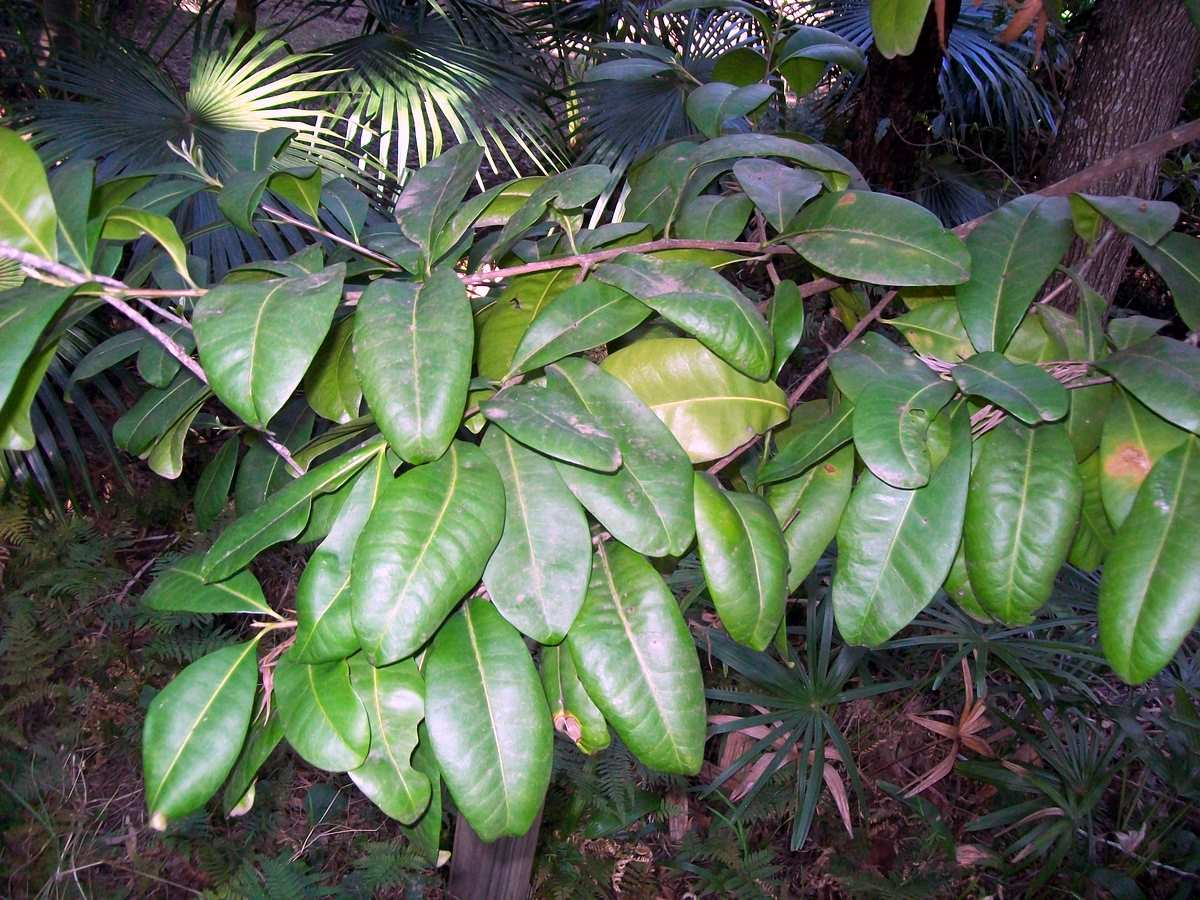

Scientific classification
- Kingdom: Plantae
- Clade: Tracheophytes
- Clade: Angiosperms
- Clade: Eudicots
- Clade: Asterids
- Order: Ericales
- Family: Sapotaceae
- Genus: Pleioluma
- Species: P. queenslandica

Binomial name
- Pleioluma queenslandica (P.Royen) Swenson (2013)

Synonyms
- Beccariella queenslandica (P.Royen) Aubrév. (1963); Planchonella queenslandica P.Royen (1957); Pouteria queenslandica (P.Royen) Jessup (2001)

= Pleioluma queenslandica =

Blush condoo

Species of tree

Pleioluma queenslandica, the blush condoo, is a large rainforest tree of the family Sapotaceae native to eastern Australia. It is found in sea side rainforest as well as the drier inland rainforests. From as far south as the Richmond River, New South Wales to Coen in tropical Queensland, and as far west as Melville Island, Northern Territory.

== Naming and taxonomy ==
The blush condoo has undergone several scientific name changes. Some taxonomists consider it to belong in the wastebasket genus Pouteria, others prefer the genus Planchonella (the latter genus is often sunk into the former). Other scientific names of this plant include Sersalisia laurifolia, Beccariella queenslandica, Pouteria queenslandica, and Sideroxylon richardii. Until fairly recently it was known as Planchonella laurifolia, now recognised as an invalid name.

== Description ==
The blush condoo is an impressive rainforest tree up to 40 metres (130 ft) tall, with a stem diameter of 90 cm (36 in). The crown of the tree is bright green, with leaves crowded towards the end of the branches.

The bark is fairly smooth on younger trees, but becomes scaly and rougher on larger trees. Small rows of vertical lenticels may appear on the trunks of younger trees. Older bark tends to fall off in irregular scales. Small branches are fairly thick and smooth, with a fawny down on the new leaf buds. When cut, a white milky sap may be seen.

Leaves are alternately arranged on the stem, without serrated edges. They are oval elliptic or oblong elliptic in shape, 9 to 20 cm (3.6–8 in) long, and 3 to 6 cm (1.2-2.4 in) wide. Shiny green above, more yellow-green underneath, the leaves are somewhat leathery to touch. The leaf stalk is between 8 and 25 mm long. Leaf veins not easily seen on the top surface, but more clear underneath. Six to sixteen lateral veins appear from the mid-rib.

=== Flowers and fruit ===
The caramel scented flowers appear in clusters in the leaf axils from the months of May to November. The hairy green or cream flowers are about 6 mm long with five petals. The fruit is a black berry, 2 cm long. Inside the flesh is one or two brown shining seeds. Narrow and oval, around 12 mm long. The seed has a scar on the side, over half the length of the seed. The fruit ripens from August to December. It is eaten by various rainforest inhabitants, including the topknot pigeon and the wompoo fruit-dove. Fresh seed is advised for regeneration.
