= Planchonella malaccensis =

Conservation status
- Near Threatened (IUCN 3.1)

Scientific classification
- Kingdom: Plantae
- Clade: Embryophytes
- Clade: Tracheophytes
- Clade: Spermatophytes
- Clade: Angiosperms
- Clade: Eudicots
- Clade: Asterids
- Order: Ericales
- Family: Sapotaceae
- Genus: Planchonella
- Species: P. malaccensis

Binomial name
- Planchonella malaccensis (C.B.Clarke) Swenson (2013)

Synonyms
- Fontbrunea malaccensis (C.B.Clarke) Pierre (1890); Lucuma malaccensis (C.B.Clarke) Dubard (1912); Pouteria malaccensis (C.B.Clarke) Baehni (1942); Sideroxylon malaccense C.B.Clarke (1882); Xantolis malaccensis (C.B.Clarke) Baehni (1965)

Species of tree

Planchonella malaccensis is a tree in the family Sapotaceae. It is named after Malacca in Peninsular Malaysia.

== Description ==
Planchonella malaccensis grows up to 30 metres (100 ft) tall with a trunk diameter of up to 70 cm (28 in). The flowers are greenish-white and fragrant. The fruits are ellipsoid to roundish and measure up to 3.8 cm (1.5 in) long.

== Distribution and habitat ==
Planchonella malaccensis is native to southern Thailand, Peninsular Malaysia, Singapore, Sumatra, Borneo, Sulawesi, the Maluku Islands and New Guinea. Its habitat is mixed dipterocarp forests to 1,400 m (4,600 ft) elevation. The timber is used locally in furniture-making.

== Conservation ==
Planchonella malaccensis has been assessed as near threatened on the IUCN Red List. Its population is declining due to land conversion for palm oil plantations and harvesting of the tree for its timber. The species' presence in protected areas such as Kinabalu Park and Semenggoh Nature Reserve affords a level of protection in Borneo.
