= Planchonella vitiensis =

Scientific classification
- Kingdom: Plantae
- Clade: Tracheophytes
- Clade: Angiosperms
- Clade: Eudicots
- Clade: Asterids
- Order: Ericales
- Family: Sapotaceae
- Genus: Planchonella
- Species: P. vitiensis

Binomial name
- Planchonella vitiensis Gillespie (1930)

Synonyms
- Pouteria vitiensis (Gillespie) O.Deg. (1949)

Species of tree

Planchonella tahitensis is a tree in the family Sapotaceae. It is endemic to Fiji.
