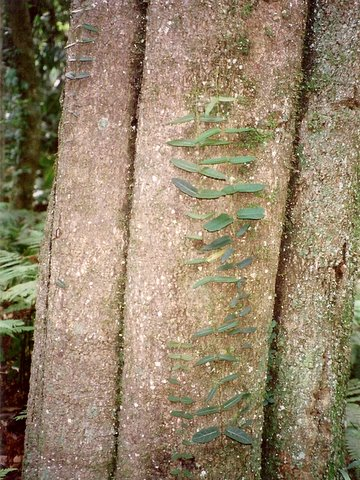
- Fluted trunk of the black apple at Watagans National Park, Australia

Scientific classification
- Kingdom: Plantae
- Clade: Tracheophytes
- Clade: Angiosperms
- Clade: Eudicots
- Clade: Asterids
- Order: Ericales
- Family: Sapotaceae
- Genus: Planchonella
- Species: P. australis

Binomial name
- Planchonella australis (R.Br.) Pierre
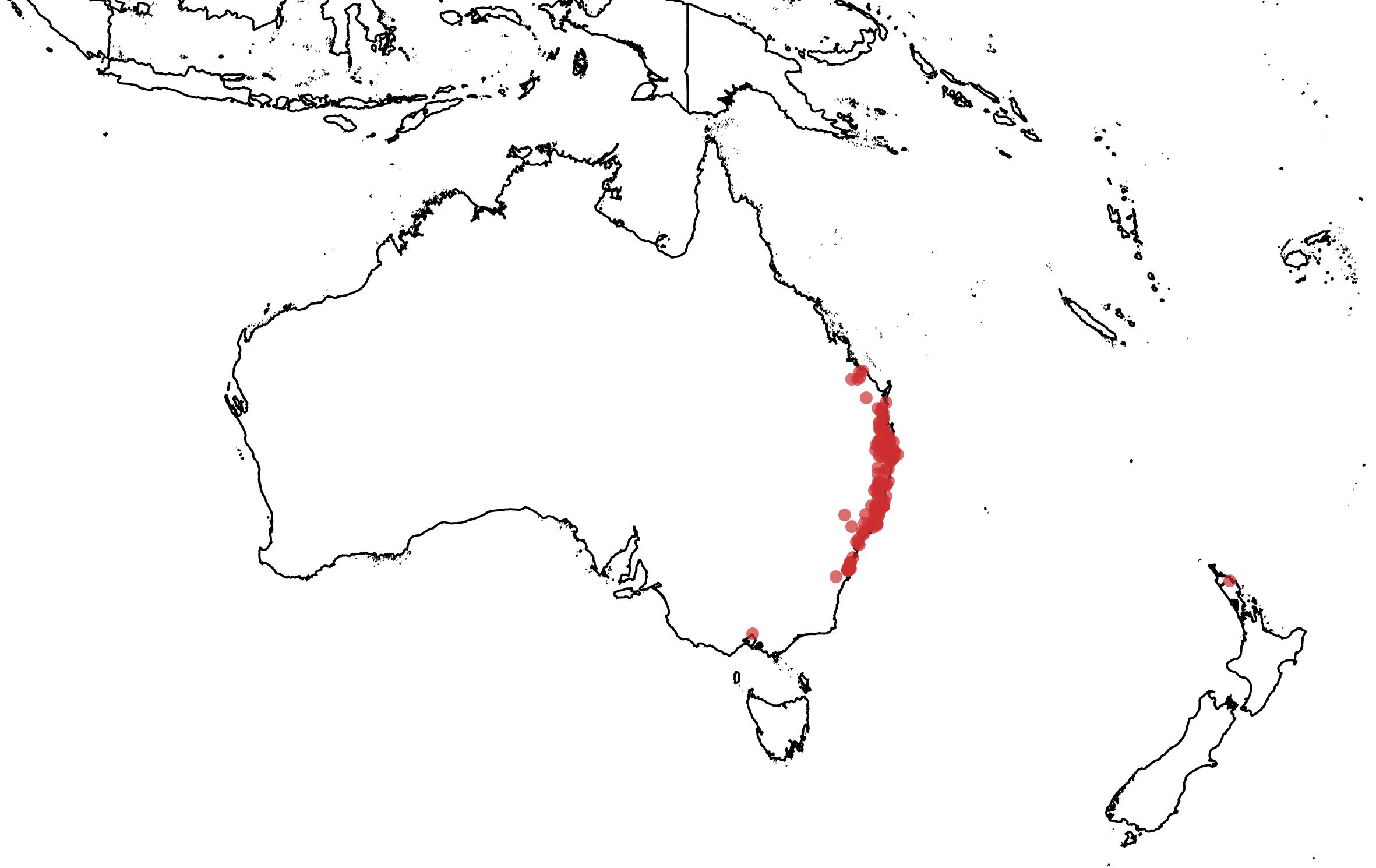
- Occurrence data from AVH

Synonyms
- Achras australis R.Br.; Pouteria australis (R.Br.) Baehni; Sapota australis (R.Br.) A.DC.; Sersalisia australis (R.Br.); Sersalisia glabra A.Gray; Sideroxylon australe (R.Br.) Benth. & Hook.f. ex F.Muell.; Xantolis australis (R.Br.) Baehni

= Planchonella australis =

Black apple

Species of tree

Planchonella australis, also known by the synonym Pouteria australis, is a medium to tall rainforest tree of the family Sapotaceae native to Queensland and New South Wales, Australia. It is known by the common name black apple, wild plum, yellow buttonwood, black plum and yellow bulletwood.

== Description ==
Planchonella australis grows as a tree reaching a maximum height of 30 metres (98 feet), with a fluted trunk up to 120 cm (47 in) diameter, with rough brown bark. The leaves are simple, measuring 8–16 cm long and 2–5 cm wide, thick and leathery. The upper surface is shiny, lower surface paler green. They taper somewhat at the apex and base, rendering a somewhat diamond-shape. The flowers are generally axillary. Resembling plums in appearance, the edible fruit are 20–65 mm long, purplish or black, containing 2–5 brown and shiny seeds, 2 cm long. They ripen from September to November. The plant bleeds a milky latex when cut or broken. Pouteria australis is protogynous; that is, the female parts of the tree mature before the male parts, to promote outcrossing.

== Distribution ==
The species ranges along the eastern coastline of Australia, from Bulburin in Queensland to the Illawarra region of New South Wales. It grows in various types of rainforest, with specimens on the red basalt soil of the MacPherson Range attaining a large size.

== Taxonomy ==
The first European account of the tree is in Captain James Cook's logs of his 1770 exploration of the East coast of Australia. The tree was later described as Achras australis by Robert Brown in his 1810 work Prodromus Florae Novae Hollandiae, before being moved to its current binomial name by Jean Baptiste Louis Pierre in 1890. The alternate name Pouteria australis was coined by Charles Baehni in 1942. It belongs to the large genus Pouteria which occurs across the tropics from South America to Indonesia and into eastern Australia. A genetic analysis of Internal transcribed spacer RNA material found that Planchonella australis was most closely related a pair of species, Planchonella cotinifolia and Planchonella eerwah - the three forming a distinct group of Australian species within the genus. An older analysis of DNA material placed it as sister taxon with Planchonella myrsinoides.

== Ecology ==
The green catbird eats the fruit, and the seeds are eaten by rodents and insects. Scientist Tim Flannery has proposed that the existence of rainforest trees with such large fruit indicates that a large fruit-eating bird (like a cassowary) once existed throughout its range as a propagator.

== Cultivation ==
Fast growing and easy to grow, Planchonella australis adapts readily to cultivation, preferring good drainage, as well as moisture, and extra fertilising. It is also tolerant of moderate frosts. It can be used in revegetation projects, and is propagated by seed or cuttings.

== Uses ==
The fruit of the black apple is edible out-of-hand. It has a sweet and fibrous flesh. However, it is also favoured by maggots, which are often found inside. The taste has been reported as variable. Indigenous Australians in the Gosford region are recorded as traditionally having eaten the seeds. The 1889 book 'The useful native plants of Australia' records "Black Apple" "Brush Apple" or Achras australis as being called "Jerra-wa-wah" in the Illawarra and Brisbane Waters areas of New South Wales. The tree was originally harvested for its timber by colonialists. The attractively yellow-patterned wood is hard and suitable for making rulers.

The fruit has been incorporated into gin production in Australia.
