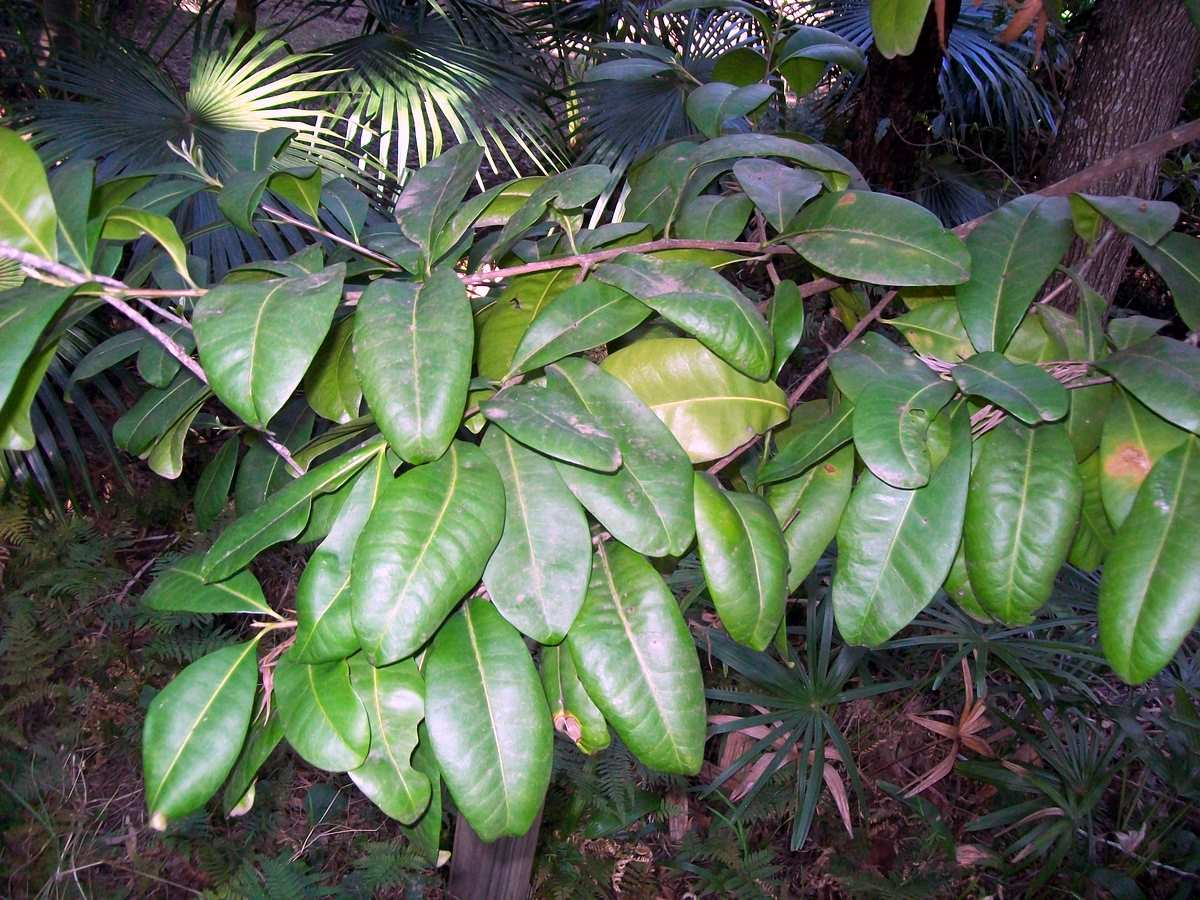
- Pleioluma queenslandica

Scientific classification
- Kingdom: Plantae
- Clade: Tracheophytes
- Clade: Angiosperms
- Clade: Eudicots
- Clade: Asterids
- Order: Ericales
- Family: Sapotaceae
- Genus: Pleioluma (Baill.) Baehni (1961)

Species
- See text

Synonyms
- Beccariella Pierre (1872)

= Pleioluma =

Genus of flowering plants

Pleioluma is a genus of flowering plants in the family Sapotaceae. It includes 40 species of evergreen hermaphroditic or gynodioecious trees, reaching up to 25 meters tall.

The genus ranges from the Nicobar Islands through Thailand, Malaysia, Indonesia, and the Philippines to New Guinea, the Bismarck Archipelago, Solomon Islands, New Caledonia, and Australia (Queensland, Northern Territory, and New South Wales). At least 15 species are native to New Guinea.

The genus was described in 1961 by Charles Baehni. In 2013 Swenson et al. enlarged the genus to include the genus Beccariella and some species formerly classed in Planchonella and Pouteria, based on a phylogenetic analysis.

== Species ==
40 species are accepted:

- Pleioluma acutifolia Swenson & Munzinger – southeastern New Caledonia
- Pleioluma azou (P.Royen) Swenson & Munzinger – southeastern New Caledonia
- Pleioluma balansana (Pierre ex Baill.) Swenson & Munzinger – New Caledonia
- Pleioluma baueri (Montrouz.) Swenson & Munzinger – New Caledonia
- Pleioluma belepensis Swenson & Munzinger – New Caledonia
- Pleioluma brownlessiana (F.Muell.) Swenson & Munzinger – northeastern Queensland
- Pleioluma butinii Swenson & Munzinger – northern and northwestern New Caledonia
- Pleioluma crebrifolia (Baill.) Swenson & Munzinger – New Caledonia
- Pleioluma densinervia (K.Krause) Swenson – eastern New Guinea
- Pleioluma dies-reginae (P.Royen) Swenson – western New Guinea
- Pleioluma dioica Swenson & Munzinger – New Caledonia
- Pleioluma ferruginea Jessup – Queensland
- Pleioluma firma (Miq.) Swenson – Nicobar Islands and Peninsular Thailand through Malesia to New Guinea and Solomon Islands
- Pleioluma foxworthyi (Elmer) Swenson – Philippines (Palawan and Mindanao)
- Pleioluma gillisonii (Vink) Swenson – eastern New Guinea (Morobe Province)
- Pleioluma krausei (H.J.Lam) Swenson – western New Guinea
- Pleioluma lamprophylla (K.Krause) Swenson – eastern New Guinea
- Pleioluma lanatifolia (P.Royen) Swenson – western New Guinea (Anggi Lakes area)
- Pleioluma lasiantha (Baill.) Swenson & Munzinger – central and southeastern New Caledonia
- Pleioluma laurifolia (A.Rich.) Swenson – New Guinea and northern Northern Territory
- Pleioluma ledermannii (K.Krause) Swenson – eastern New Guinea and Bismarck Archipelago
- Pleioluma longipetiolata (Aubrév.) Swenson & Munzinger – New Caledonia
- Pleioluma lucens (P.Royen) Swenson & Munzinger – southeastern New Caledonia
- Pleioluma macrocarpa (P.Royen) Swenson – northeastern Queensland
- Pleioluma macropoda (H.J.Lam) Swenson – Sulawesi and New Guinea
- Pleioluma moluccana (Burck) Swenson – Java, Lesser Sunda Islands, Sulwesi, Maluku, and western New Guinea
- Pleioluma monticola (K.Krause) Swenson – New Guinea
- Pleioluma novocaledonica (Dubard) Swenson & Munzinger – east-central and southeastern New Caledonia
- Pleioluma papyracea (P.Royen) Swenson – Queensland (Cook)
- Pleioluma pilosa Jessup – Queensland
- Pleioluma queenslandica (P.Royen) Swenson – northern and eastern Queensland and northeastern New South Wales
- Pleioluma rigidifolia (K.Krause) Swenson – eastern New Guinea
- Pleioluma rubicunda (Pierre ex Baill.) Swenson & Munzinger – New Caledonia
- Pleioluma sebertii (Pancher) Swenson & Munzinger – southeastern New Caledonia
- Pleioluma singuliflora (C.T.White & W.D.Francis) Swenson – northeastern Queensland
- Pleioluma tchingouensis Swenson & Munzinger – north-central New Caledonia
- Pleioluma tenuipedicellata Swenson & Munzinger – New Caledonia
- Pleioluma vieillardii (Baill.) Swenson & Munzinger – west-central New Caledonia (northwestern Koniambo Massif)
- Pleioluma wandae (Vink) Swenson – western New Guinea (Vogelkop Peninsula)
- Pleioluma xerocarpa (F.Muell. ex Benth.) Swenson – northern Queensland
