= Pleioluma balansana =

Conservation status
- Endangered (IUCN 2.3)

Scientific classification
- Kingdom: Plantae
- Clade: Tracheophytes
- Clade: Angiosperms
- Clade: Eudicots
- Clade: Asterids
- Order: Ericales
- Family: Sapotaceae
- Genus: Pleioluma
- Species: P. balansana

Binomial name
- Pleioluma balansana (Pierre ex Baill.) Swenson & Munzinger (2013)

Synonyms
- Beccariella balansana (Pierre ex Baill.) Aubrév. (1962); Beccariella brevipedicellata (P.Royen) Aubrév. (1967); Planchonella balansana (Pierre ex Baill.) Pierre ex Dubard (1912); Planchonella baueri var. brevipedicellata P.Royen in Blumea 8: 418 (1957); Planchonella lecardii (Baill.) Guillaumin (1943); Pouteria balansana (Pierre ex Baill.) Baehni (1942); Pouteria lecardii (Baill.) Baehni (1942); Sideroxylon balansanum Pierre ex Baill. (1890); Sideroxylon lecardii Baill. (1891)

Species of flowering plant

Pleioluma balansana is a species of plant in the family Sapotaceae. It is endemic to New Caledonia.
