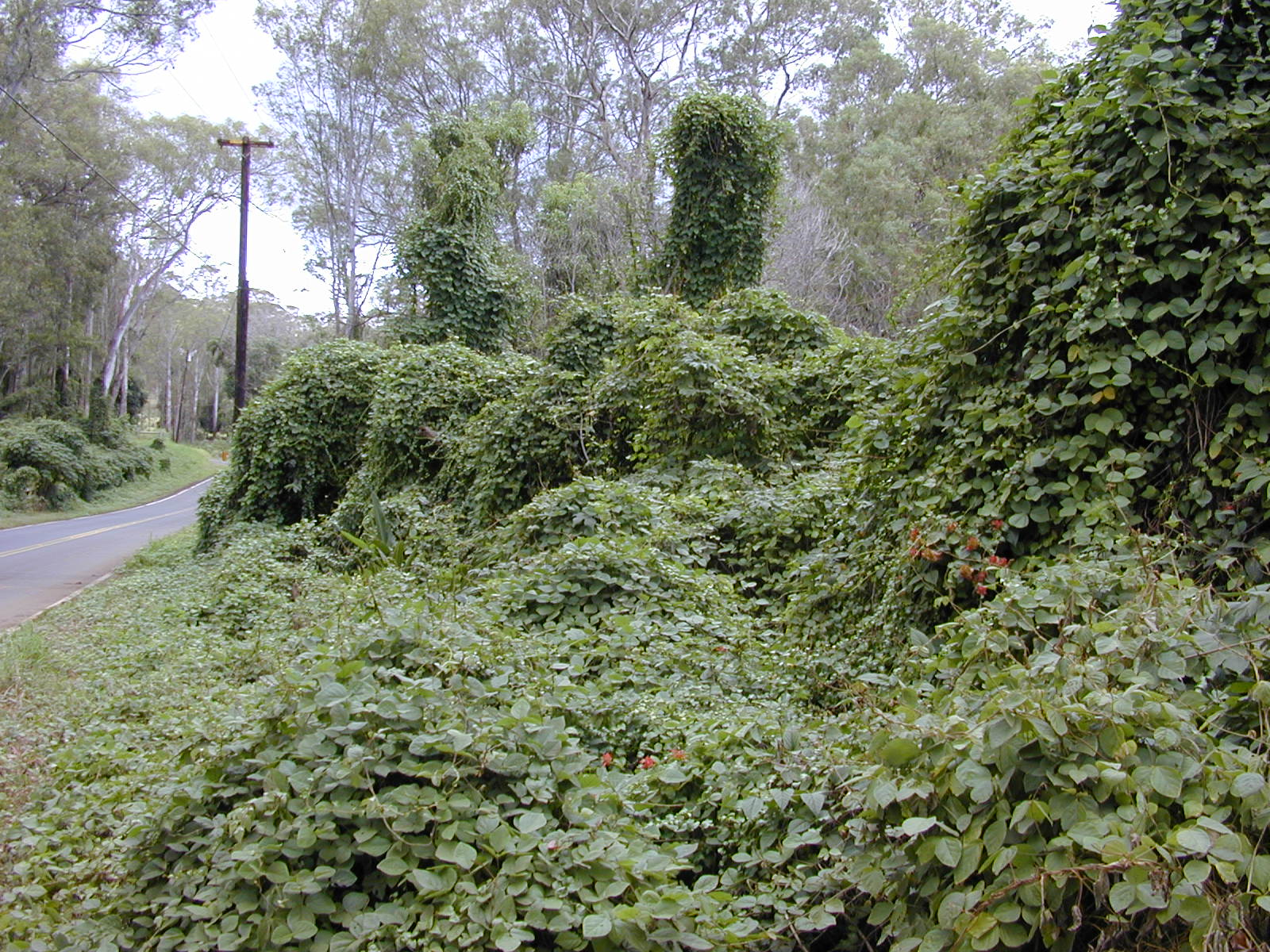
- Neonotonia wightii climbing in vegetation

Scientific classification
- Kingdom: Plantae
- Clade: Tracheophytes
- Clade: Angiosperms
- Clade: Eudicots
- Clade: Rosids
- Order: Fabales
- Family: Fabaceae
- Subfamily: Faboideae
- Subtribe: Glycininae
- Genus: Neonotonia; J.A.Lackey (1977)

Species
- Neonotonia verdcourtii Isely; Neonotonia wightii (Wight & Arn.) J.A.Lackey

Synonyms
- Johnia Wight & Arn. (1834), nom. illeg.; Notonia Wight & Arn. (1834)

= Neonotonia =

Genus of legumes

Neonotonia is a genus of flowering plants in the legume family, Fabaceae. It includes two species of scandent or climbing herbs native to sub-Saharan Africa, Yemen, India, and Sri Lanka. Typical habitats include seasonally-dry tropical forest, woodland, thicket, scrub, wooded grassland, grassland, and cultivated areas. It belongs to the subfamily Faboideae.
