= Planchonella reticulata =

Conservation status
- Near Threatened (IUCN 3.1)

Scientific classification
- Kingdom: Plantae
- Clade: Tracheophytes
- Clade: Angiosperms
- Clade: Eudicots
- Clade: Asterids
- Order: Ericales
- Family: Sapotaceae
- Genus: Planchonella
- Species: P. reticulata

Binomial name
- Planchonella reticulata (Baill.) Pierre ex Dubard (1912)

Synonyms
- Pouteria myrsinoides subsp. reticulata (Baill.) P.S.Green (1990); Pouteria viscosa Baehni (1942); Sideroxylon reticulatum Baill. (1890); Xantolis reticulata (Baill.) Baehni (1965)

Subspecies of plant

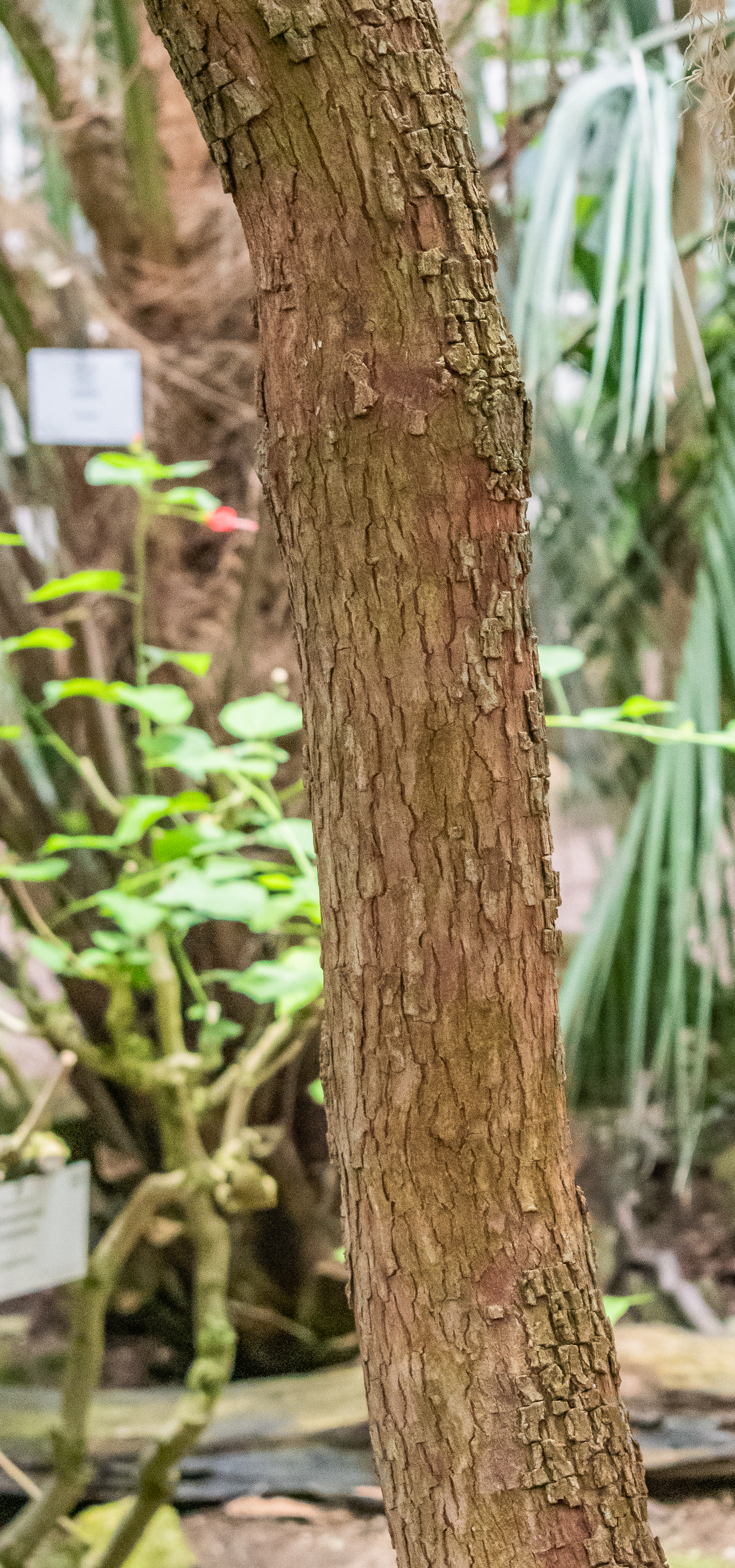
Planchonella reticulata in the Palm House Schönbrunn in Vienna, Austria

Planchonella reticulata is a flowering plant in the sapodilla family, Sapotaceae. It is a shrub or tree endemic to east-central New Caledonia. The specific epithet refers to the reticulate venation (network-like pattern of the veins) on the leaves.

== Description ==
It is a small tree growing to 6 m, occasionally 10 m, in height, with a watery, white latex. The alternate, oval leaves are usually 40–80 mm long and 20–40 mm wide. The inconspicuous green flowers, 8 mm long, appear from May to July. The pointed, egg-shaped fruits are 13 mm long.

== Distribution and habitat ==
The species is endemic to the French territory of New Caledonia in the south-west Pacific Ocean. It has a scattered distribution on the central ultramafic massif and along the east coast of Grand Terre, from Goro to Tontouta and from Canala to Poro, and on the Isle of Pines. It grows in shrubland (maquis) or dense humid forest over ultramafic rock from 5 to 960 metres elevation.

Some authorities list the species as native to Lord Howe Island. The Lord Howe population is now classed as Planchonella myrsinifolia subsp. howeana.
