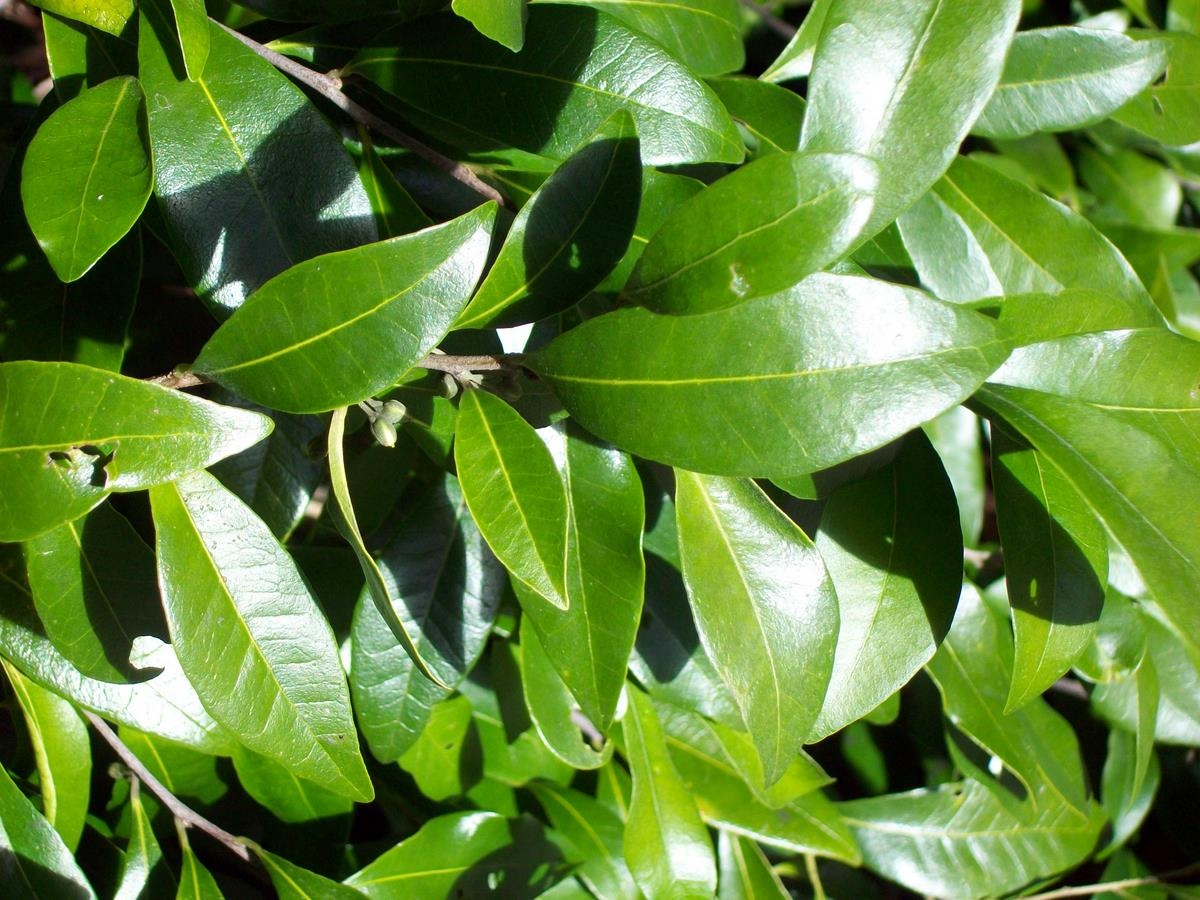

Scientific classification
- Kingdom: Plantae
- Clade: Tracheophytes
- Clade: Angiosperms
- Clade: Eudicots
- Clade: Asterids
- Order: Ericales
- Family: Sapotaceae
- Genus: Planchonella
- Species: P. myrsinifolia

Binomial name
- Planchonella myrsinifolia (F.Muell.) Swenson, Bartish & Munzinger (2007)

Synonyms
- Pouteria myrsinifolia (F.Muell.) Jessup (2001); Sersalisia myrsinifolia F.Muell. (1866)

= Planchonella myrsinifolia =

Species of tree

Planchonella myrsinifolia is a tree in the plant family Sapotaceae. It is native to Australia, with subspecies myrsinifolia native to Queensland and New South Wales on the Australian mainland, and subspecies howeana is endemic to Lord Howe Island.

The specific epithet myrsinifolia refers to a similarity of the leaves of certain plants in the genus Myrsine.
