= Planchonella crenata =

Scientific classification
- Kingdom: Plantae
- Clade: Tracheophytes
- Clade: Angiosperms
- Clade: Eudicots
- Clade: Asterids
- Order: Ericales
- Family: Sapotaceae
- Genus: Planchonella
- Species: P. crenata

Binomial name
- Planchonella crenata Swenson, Munzinger & Bartish, 2007

Species of plant

Planchonella crenata is a species of plant in the family Sapotaceae. It is endemic to New Caledonia. As with other species in the same genus, it possesses stamens that are located below (and rarely in) the tube orifice; a multi-seeded fruit, as well as foliaceous cotyledons embedded in endosperm.
