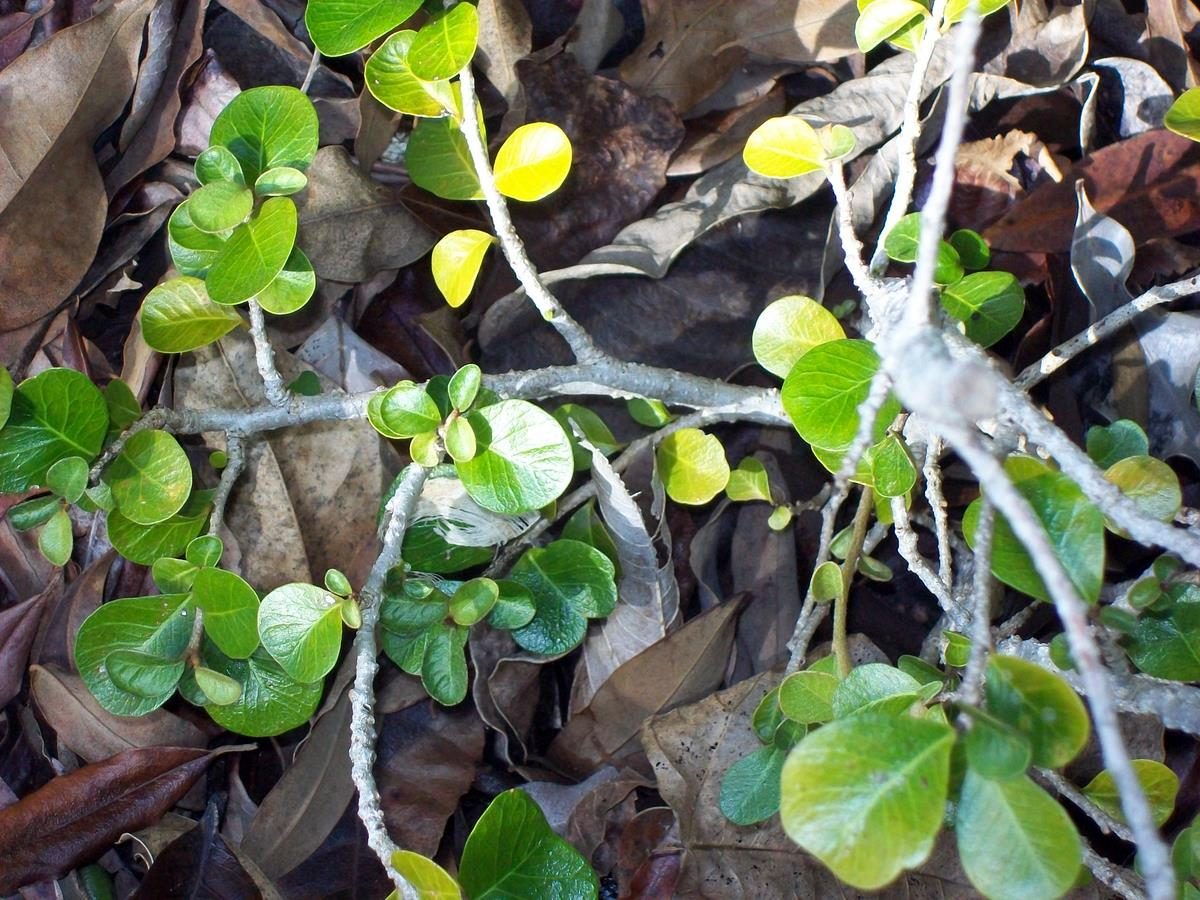

Conservation status
- Least Concern (IUCN 3.1)

Scientific classification
- Kingdom: Plantae
- Clade: Tracheophytes
- Clade: Angiosperms
- Clade: Eudicots
- Clade: Asterids
- Order: Ericales
- Family: Sapotaceae
- Genus: Planchonella
- Species: P. cotinifolia

Binomial name
- Planchonella cotinifolia (A.DC.) Dubard (1912)

Synonyms
- Achras cotinifolia (A.DC.) F.Muell. (1871); Hormogyne cotinifolia A.DC. (1844); Mimusops cotinifolia A.Cunn. ex A.DC. (1844), not validly publ.; Pouteria cotinifolia (A.DC.) Baehni (1942); Sersalisia cotinifolia (A.DC.) F.Muell. (1866); Sideroxylon cotinifolium (A.DC.) Engl. (1897); Xantolis cotinifolia (A.DC.) Baehni (1965)

= Planchonella cotinifolia =

Species of tree

Planchonella cotinifolia is an Australian tree in the family Sapotaceae. The common names include small-leaved plum, yellow lemon and small-leaved coondoo. It occurs in the drier rainforests from the Richmond River, New South Wales to the Wenlock River in tropical Queensland.

It grows as a small tree, up to 15 m (49 ft) tall and a stem diameter of 40 cm (16 in). It may be recognised by the small leaves, 1–5 cm (0.39–1.97 in) m long, 0.5–3 cm (0.20–1.18 in) wide, with a rounded tip. Flowering occurs between February and March. The fruit is glossy black, usually containing one shining light brown seed. The seed has a lengthwise scar.

It belongs to the genus Planchonella which occurs across the tropics of Southeast Asia, New Guinea, the Pacific islands, and into northern and eastern Australia. A genetic analysis of material found that Planchonella cotinifolia was most closely related to Planchonella eerwah and Planchonella australis and was a sister to the two species, the three forming a distinct group.

Two varieties are recognized:

- Planchonella cotinifolia var. pubescens
- Planchonella cotinifolia var. cotinifolia
