= Planchonella glauca =

Scientific classification
- Kingdom: Plantae
- Clade: Tracheophytes
- Clade: Angiosperms
- Clade: Eudicots
- Clade: Asterids
- Order: Ericales
- Family: Sapotaceae
- Genus: Planchonella
- Species: P. glauca

Binomial name
- Planchonella glauca Swenson, Munzinger & Bartish, 2007

Species of flowering plant

Planchonella glauca is a species of plant in the family Sapotaceae. It is endemic to New Caledonia. As with other species in the same genus it possesses stamens that are located below (and rarely in) the tube orifice; a multi-seeded fruit, as well as foliaceous cotyledons embedded in endosperm.
