= Planchonella pomifera =

Scientific classification
- Kingdom: Plantae
- Clade: Tracheophytes
- Clade: Angiosperms
- Clade: Eudicots
- Clade: Asterids
- Order: Ericales
- Family: Sapotaceae
- Genus: Planchonella
- Species: P. pomifera

Binomial name
- Planchonella pomifera (Pierre ex Baill.) Dubard (1912)

Synonyms
- Beauvisagea pomifera Pierre ex Baill. (1891); Bureavella doonsaf (P.Royen) Aubrév. in Adansonia, n.s., 3: 332 (1963); Lucuma pomifera (Pierre ex Baill.) H.J.Lam (1925), nom. illeg.; Pouteria doonsaf P.Royen in Blumea 8: 502 (1957); Sideroxylon pomiferum (Pierre ex Baill.) Engl. (1897)

Species of tree

Planchonella pomifera is a tree in the family Sapotaceae. It is endemic to Western New Guinea.
