= Planchonella latihila =

Scientific classification
- Kingdom: Plantae
- Clade: Tracheophytes
- Clade: Angiosperms
- Clade: Eudicots
- Clade: Asterids
- Order: Ericales
- Family: Sapotaceae
- Genus: Planchonella
- Species: P. latihila

Binomial name
- Planchonella latihila Swenson, Munzinger & Bartish, 2007

Species of flowering plant

Planchonella latihila is a species of plant in the family Sapotaceae. It is endemic to New Caledonia. As with other plants in the same genus, it possesses stamens that are located below (and rarely in) the tube orifice; a multi-seeded fruit, as well as foliaceous cotyledons embedded in endosperm.
