= Planchonella spectabilis =

Scientific classification
- Kingdom: Plantae
- Clade: Tracheophytes
- Clade: Angiosperms
- Clade: Eudicots
- Clade: Asterids
- Order: Ericales
- Family: Sapotaceae
- Genus: Planchonella
- Species: P. spectabilis

Binomial name
- Planchonella spectabilis (Miq.) Dubard (1912)

Synonyms
- Boerlagella spectabilis (Miq.) H.J.Lam (1925); Boerlagia spectabilis (Miq.) Pierre (1890); Sapota spectabilis Miq. (1861); Sideroxylon spectabile (Miq.) Burck (1885)

Genus of flowering plants

Planchonella spectabilis is a species of flowering plant in the family Sapotaceae. It is a tree endemic to the island of Sumatra in Indonesia.
