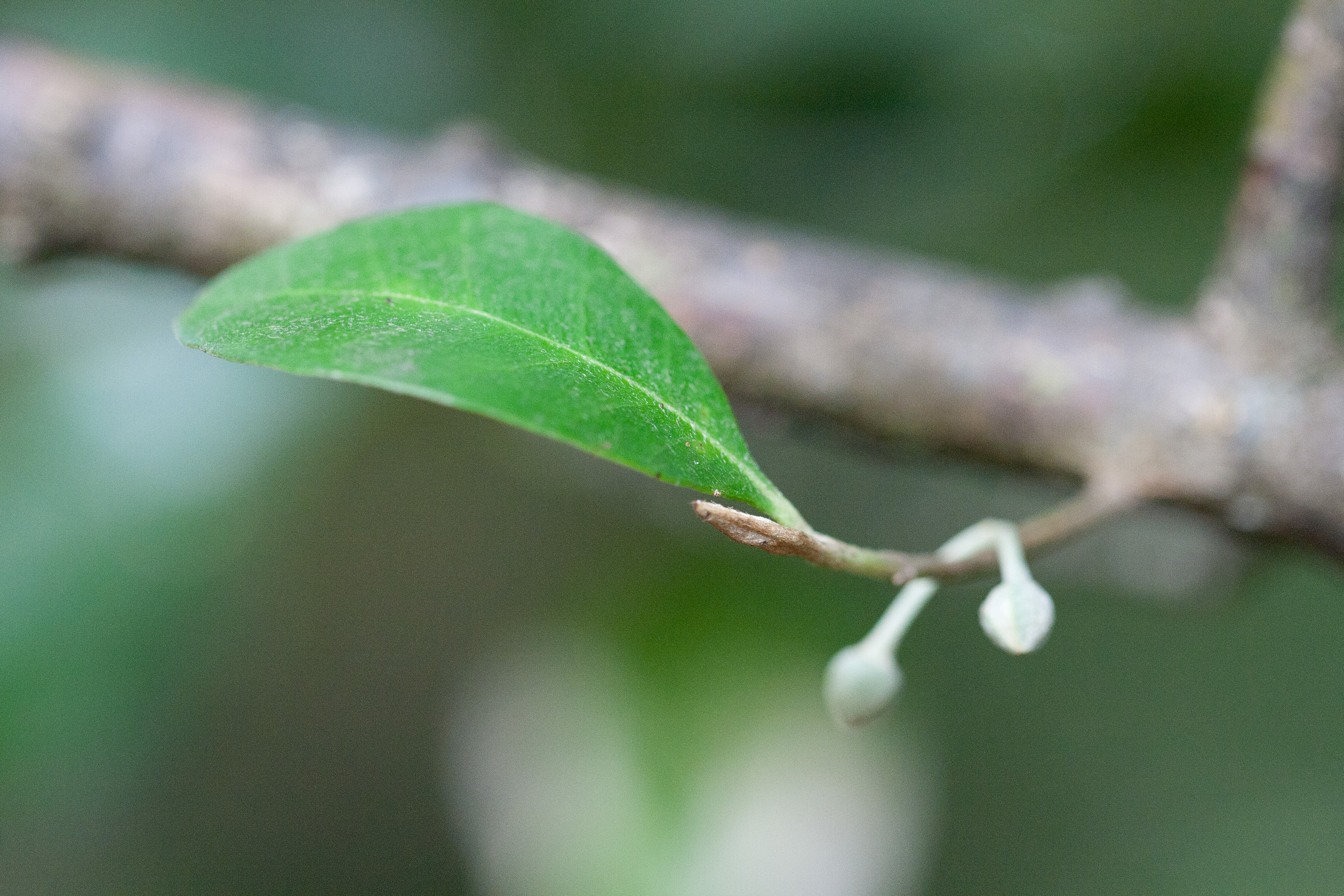

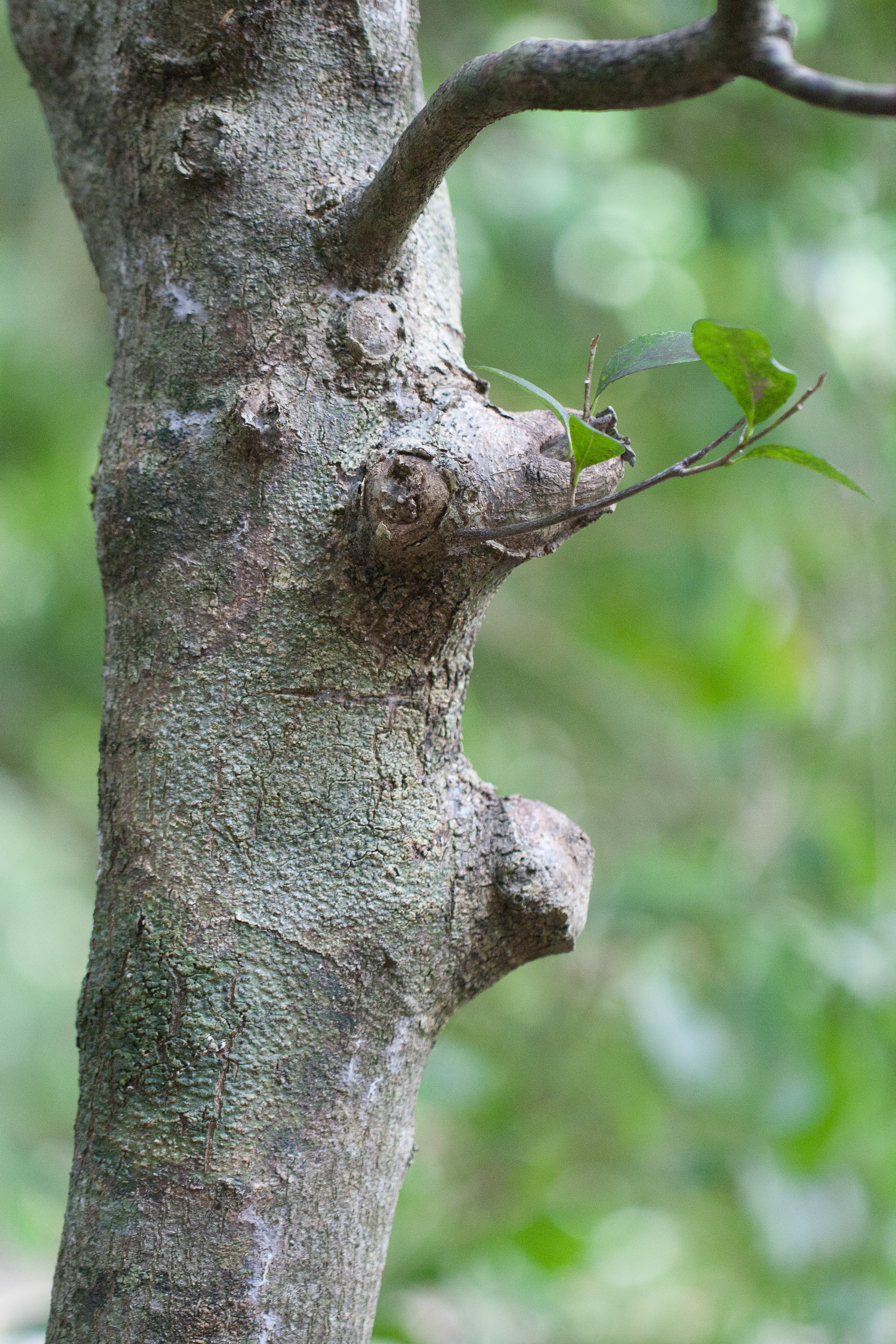

Scientific classification
- Kingdom: Plantae
- Clade: Tracheophytes
- Clade: Angiosperms
- Clade: Eudicots
- Clade: Asterids
- Order: Ericales
- Family: Sapotaceae
- Genus: Planchonella
- Species: P. myrsinifolia
- Subspecies: P. m. subsp. howeana

Trinomial name
- Planchonella myrsinifolia subsp. howeana (F.Muell.) Jessup (2019)

Synonyms
- Achras howeana F.Muell. (1875); Planchonella howeana (F.Muell.) Pierre (1890); Pouteria howeana (F.Muell.) Baehni (1942); Sersalisia howeana (F.Muell.) Domin (1928); Sideroxylon howeanum (F.Muell.) F.Muell. (1882)

= Planchonella myrsinifolia subsp. howeana =

Subspecies of plant

Planchonella myrsinifolia subsp. howeana is a subspecies of plant in the family Sapotaceae. It is a shrub or tree endemic to Lord Howe Island.

== Description ==
It is a small tree growing to 6 m, occasionally 10 m, in height, with a watery, white latex. The alternate, oval leaves are usually 40–80 mm long and 20–40 mm wide. The inconspicuous green flowers, 8 mm long, appear from May to July. The pointed, egg-shaped fruits are 13 mm long.

== Distribution and habitat ==
The subspecies is found on Australia's subtropical Lord Howe Island. It is a common tree at low elevations.
