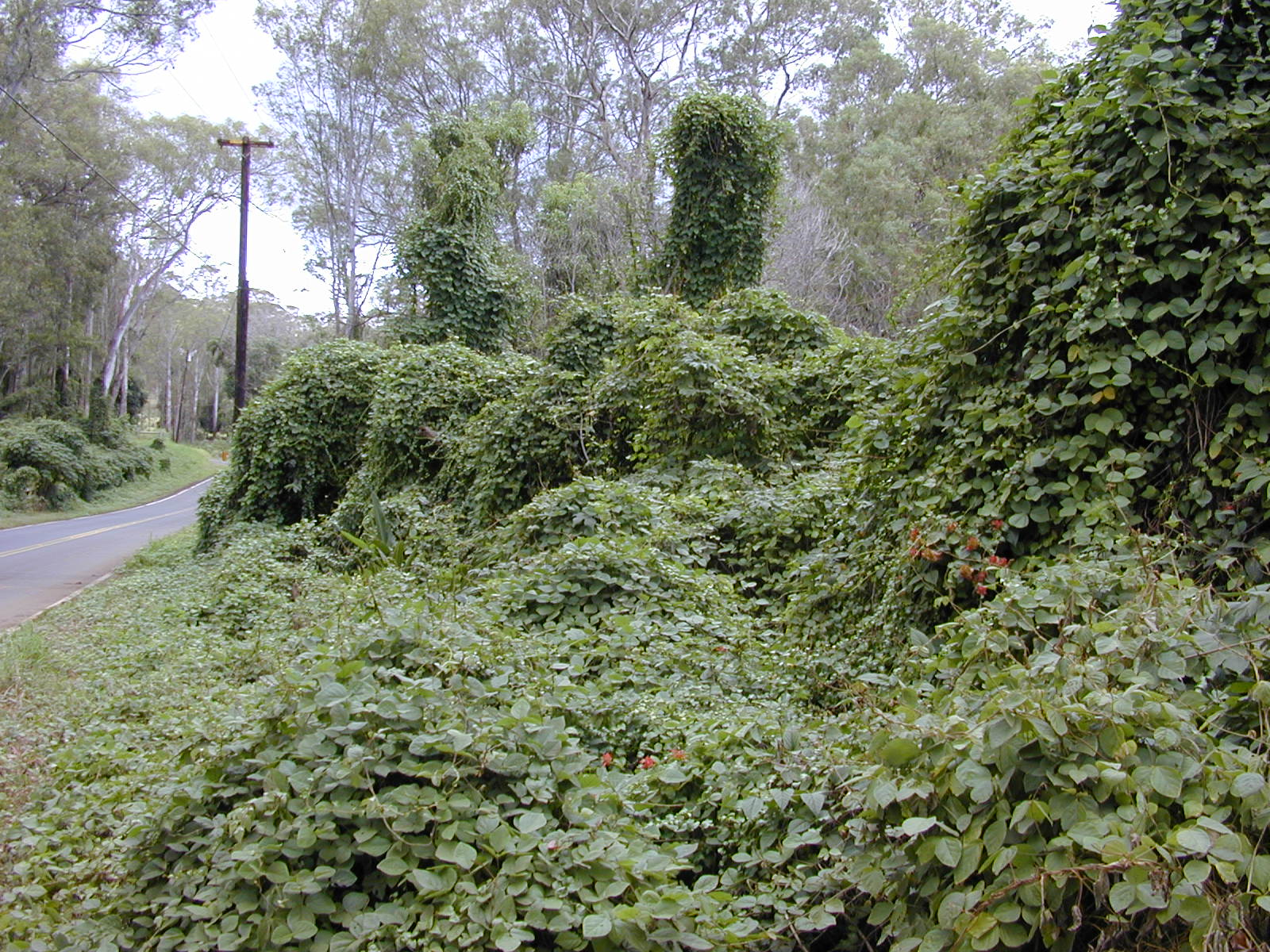
- Climbing on vegetation, Maui
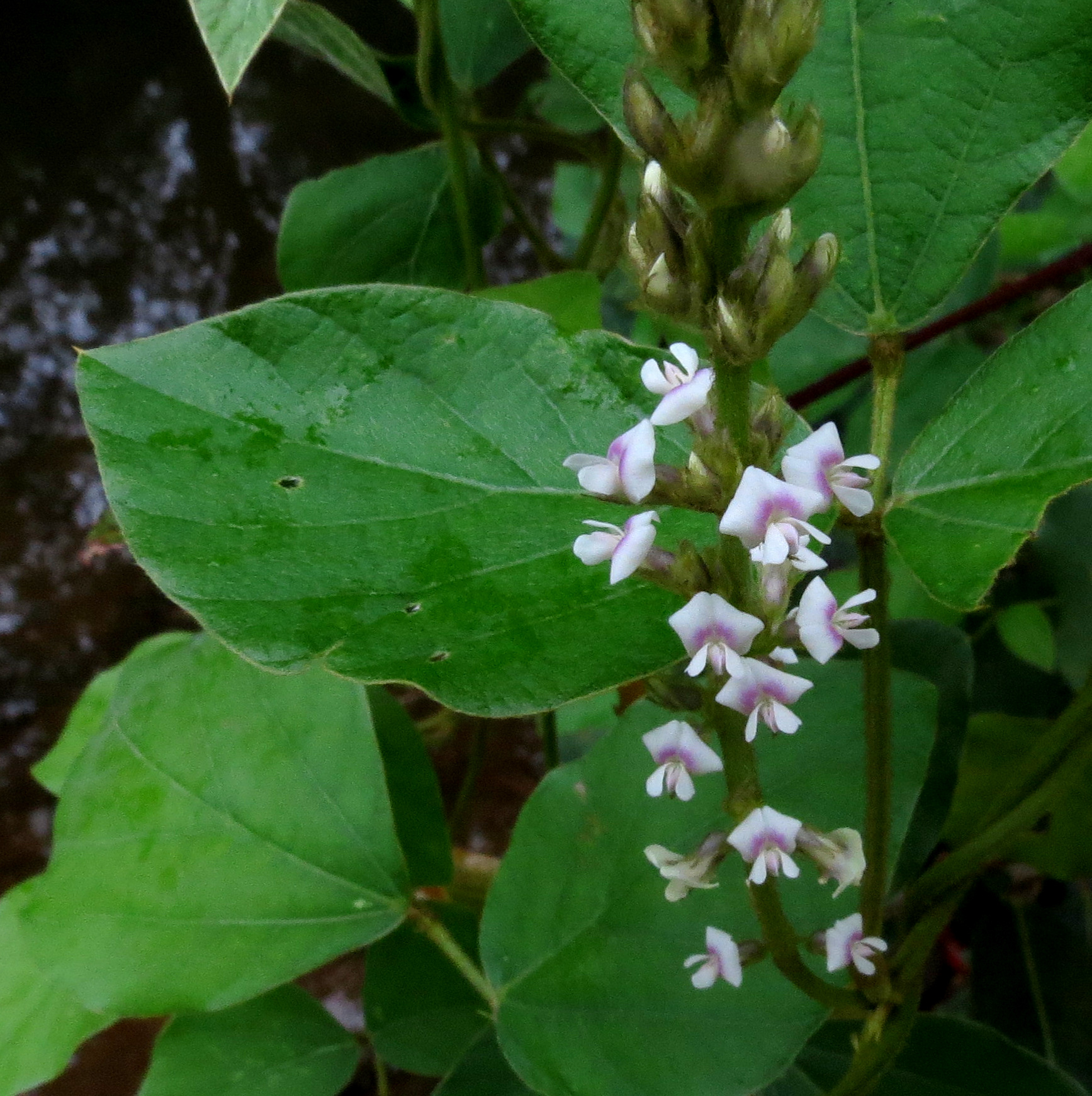
- Flowers and leaves

Scientific classification
- Kingdom: Plantae
- Clade: Tracheophytes
- Clade: Angiosperms
- Clade: Eudicots
- Clade: Rosids
- Order: Fabales
- Family: Fabaceae
- Subfamily: Faboideae
- Genus: Neonotonia
- Species: N. wightii

Binomial name
- Neonotonia wightii (Wight & Arn.) J.A.Lackey

Synonyms
- List: Glycine albidiflora De Wild.; Glycine bujacia Benth.; Glycine claessensii De Wild.; Glycine laurentii De Wild.; Glycine longicauda Schweinf.; Glycine mearnsii De Wild.; Glycine micrantha Hochst. ex A.Rich.; Glycine petitiana (A.Rich.) Schweinf.; Glycine pseudojavanica Taub.; Glycine rooseveltii De Wild.; Glycine wightii (Wight & Arn.) Verdc.; Glycine wightii var. coimbatorensis A.Sen; Johnia petitiana A.Rich.; Johnia wightii (Wight & Arn.) Wight & Arn.; Neonotonia wightii var. coimbatorensis (A.Sen) Karthik.; Notonia wightii Wight & Arn.; Soja wightii Graham

= Neonotonia wightii =

Species of plant

Neonotonia wightii, the perennial soybean, is a species of flowering plant in the family Fabaceae, native to sub‑Saharan Africa, Yemen, India, and Sri Lanka, and widely introduced as a forage in Brazil, Bolivia, Paraguay, northern Argentina, the Mascarene Islands, Peninsular Malaysia, Java, New Guinea, Queensland and New South Wales in Australia, and Fiji. It is shade tolerant.

== Subtaxa ==
The following subtaxa are accepted:

- Neonotonia wightii var. longicauda (Schweinf.) J.A.Lackey
- Neonotonia wightii var. mearnsii (De Wild.) J.A.Lackey
- Neonotonia wightii subsp. petitiana (A.Rich.) J.A.Lackey
- Neonotonia wightii subsp. pseudojavanica (Taub.) J.A.Lackey
- Neonotonia wightii subsp. wightii
