= Planchonella pinifolia =

Conservation status
- Endangered (IUCN 3.1)

Scientific classification
- Kingdom: Plantae
- Clade: Tracheophytes
- Clade: Angiosperms
- Clade: Eudicots
- Clade: Asterids
- Order: Ericales
- Family: Sapotaceae
- Genus: Planchonella
- Species: P. pinifolia

Binomial name
- Planchonella pinifolia (Baill.) Dubard

Synonyms
- Iteiluma pinifolium (Baill.) Aubrév. Lucuma pinifolia Baill. Peuceluma pinifolia Baill. Pouteria pinifolia (Baill.) Baehni; Sideroxylon pinifolium (Baill.) Engl.

Species of flowering plant

Planchonella pinifolia is a species of plant in the family Sapotaceae. It is endemic to New Caledonia.
