= Planchonella tahitensis =

Conservation status
- Least Concern (IUCN 3.1)

Scientific classification
- Kingdom: Plantae
- Clade: Embryophytes
- Clade: Tracheophytes
- Clade: Angiosperms
- Clade: Eudicots
- Clade: Asterids
- Order: Ericales
- Family: Sapotaceae
- Genus: Planchonella
- Species: P. tahitensis

Binomial name
- Planchonella tahitensis (Nadeaud) Pierre ex Dubard (1912)

Synonyms
- List: Lucuma vitiensis (A.Gray) Gillespie (1930); Planchonella costata var. vitiensis (A.Gray) H.J.Lam (1942); Planchonella grayana H.St.John (1934); Pouteria costata var. vitiensis (A.Gray) Baehni (1942); Pouteria tahitensis (Nadeaud) Govaerts (2001 publ. 2002); Sapota vitiensis A.Gray (1862); Sideroxylon tahitense Nadeaud (1897); Sideroxylon tannaense Guillaumin (1932); Sideroxylon vitiense (A.Gray) Benth. & Hook.f. ex Drake (1892)

Species of tree

Planchonella tahitensis is a tree in the family Sapotaceae. It is native to the islands of the south Pacific, including the Cook Islands, Fiji, Niue, the Samoan Islands, Society Islands, Tonga, Tuamotu, Tubuai Islands, Vanuatu, and Wallis and Futuna.
