= Planchonella maclayana =

Scientific classification
- Kingdom: Plantae
- Clade: Tracheophytes
- Clade: Angiosperms
- Clade: Eudicots
- Clade: Asterids
- Order: Ericales
- Family: Sapotaceae
- Genus: Planchonella
- Species: P. maclayana

Binomial name
- Planchonella maclayana (F.Muell.) Swenson (2013)

Synonyms
- List: Bassia dubia Gaertn. (1790); Bassia maclayana F.Muell. (1885); Bureavella macleyana (F.Muell.) Pierre (1890); Illipe maclayana (F.Muell.) F.Muell. (1885); Lucuma maclayana (F.Muell.) H.J.Lam (1925); Lucuma navicularis H.J.Lam (1925); Pouteria maclayana (F.Muell.) Baehni (1942); Pouteria navicularis (H.J.Lam) Baehni (1942); Sideroxylon zippelianum Pierre ex Boerl. (1891)

Species of tree

Planchonella maclayana is a tree in the family Sapotaceae. It grows up to 18 m (60 ft) tall with a trunk diameter of up to 25 cm (10 in). The fruits are roundish, up to 1.3 cm (1 in) long.

It ranges from Borneo through Sulawesi, Maluku, and New Guinea to the Solomon Islands. Its habitat is forests from sea-level to 1,500 m (4,900 ft) elevation.

The tree is named for Russian explorer and biologist Nicholas Miklouho-Maclay.
