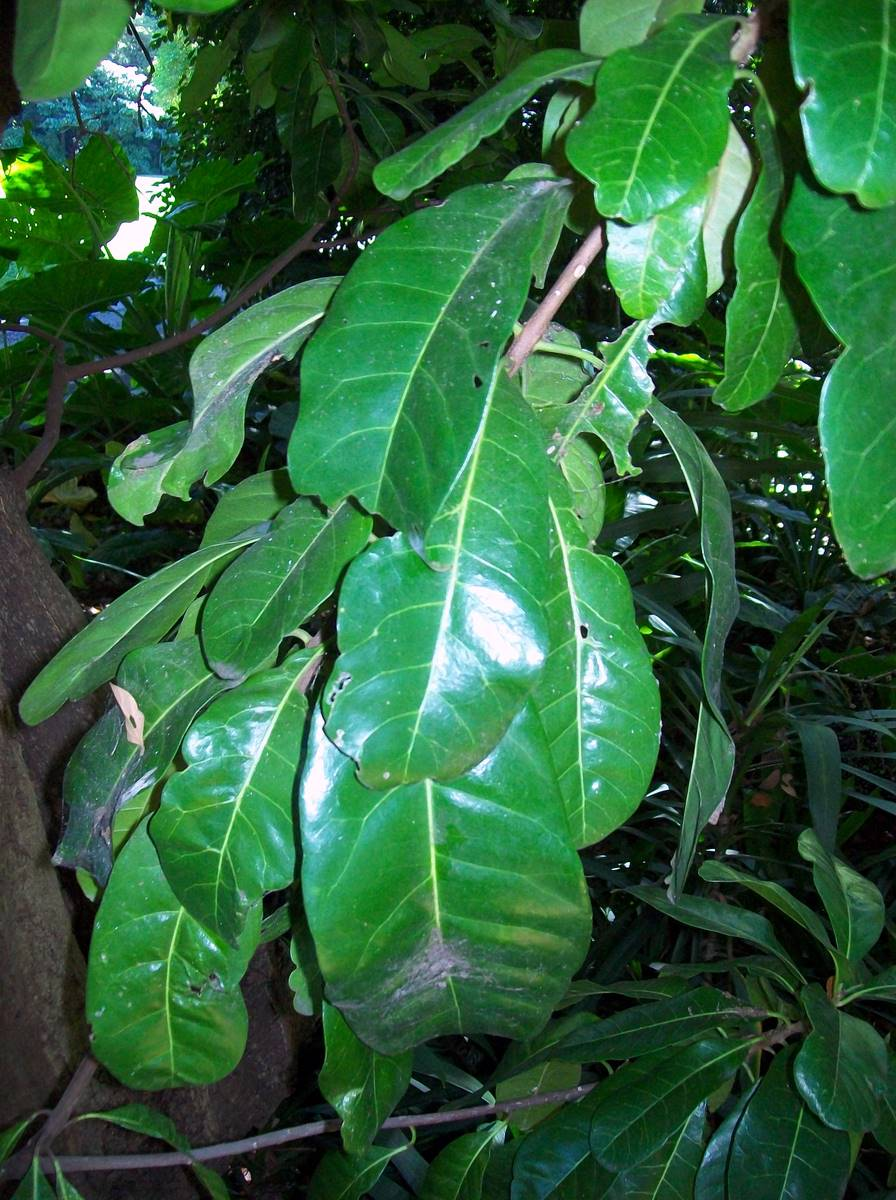
- Royal Botanic Gardens, Sydney

Scientific classification
- Kingdom: Plantae
- Clade: Tracheophytes
- Clade: Angiosperms
- Clade: Eudicots
- Clade: Asterids
- Order: Ericales
- Family: Sapotaceae
- Genus: Planchonella
- Species: P. obovata

Binomial name
- Planchonella obovata (R.Br.) Pierre (1890)

Synonyms
- 58 synonyms: Homotypic; Pouteria obovata (R.Br.) Baehni; Sapota obovata (R.Br.) Radlk. ex Holle; Sersalisia obovata R.Br.; Sideroxylon obovatum (R.Br.) Sm.; Heterotypic; Achras obovata F.Muell. ex Benth.; Chrysophyllum acuminatum Bojer; Chrysophyllum obovatum Wall. ex A.DC.; Hormogyne cochinchinensis Dubard; Planchonella argentea Pierre; Planchonella attenuata (A.DC.) Pierre; Planchonella bancana (Burck) Pierre; Planchonella chrysophylla (de Vriese) Pierre; Planchonella clarkeana R.Kumari & Thoth.; Planchonella cochinchinensis Dubard; Planchonella ferruginea (Hook. & Arn.) Pierre; Planchonella glabra (Ridl.) H.J.Lam; Planchonella indica (Burck) Pierre; Planchonella javensis (Burck) Pierre; Planchonella kingiana R.Kumari & Thoth.; Planchonella kingiana var. andamanica R.Kumari & Thoth.; Planchonella lanceolata (Burck) Pierre; Planchonella merrillii Dubard; Planchonella nodosa (Burck) Pierre; Planchonella obovata Pierre; Planchonella obovata var. dubia (Koidz. ex Nakai) Hatus.; Planchonella philippensis Dubard; Planchonella polymorpha Dubard; Pouteria clarkeana (R.Kumari & Thoth.) R.Kumari & Thoth.; Pouteria glabra (Ridl.) I.M.Turner; Pouteria kingiana (R.Kumari & Thoth.) R.Kumari & Thoth.; Pouteria obovata var. dubia (Koidz. ex Nakai) H.Hara; Sersalisia ferruginea (Hook. & Arn.) Nakai; Sersalisia liukiuensis (Nakai) Nakai; Sideroxylon ahernianum Merr.; Sideroxylon apoense Elmer; Sideroxylon argenteum Spreng.; Sideroxylon attenuatum A.DC.; Sideroxylon bancanum Burck; Sideroxylon brownii F.Muell.; Sideroxylon chrysophyllum de Vriese; Sideroxylon coriaceum Merr.; Sideroxylon dubium Koidz. ex Nakai; Sideroxylon ferrugineum Hook. & Arn.; Sideroxylon glabrum Ridl.; Sideroxylon glomeratum Volkens; Sideroxylon indicum Burck; Sideroxylon javense Burck; Sideroxylon lanceolatum Burck; Sideroxylon liukiuense Nakai; Sideroxylon merrillii (Dubard) Merr.; Sideroxylon nodosum Burck; Sideroxylon novoguineense K.Schum.; Sideroxylon obovatum Griff.; Sideroxylon obovatum Burck; Sideroxylon obovatum var. ceramense Burck; Sideroxylon philippense (Dubard) Merr.; Sideroxylon timorense Blume ex Pierre; Sideroxylon undulatum Burck

= Planchonella obovata =

Species of tree

Planchonella obovata is a species of tree in the family Sapotaceae. The common name in Australia is the northern yellow boxwood. It occurs in many parts of south-east Asia, Micronesia, and on islands of the Indian Ocean, and has local common names there.

Planchonella obovata grows as a bushy-crowned tree reaching a maximum height of 10 to 20 metres (33 to 66 ft). The leaves hairy when young, with upper surfaces becoming smooth and shiny. They are roughly oval- to spear-shaped and measure 6–24 cm (2.5–9.5 in) long, and 1.5–15 cm (0.59–5.91 in) wide. Appearing from August to October, the tiny greenish-white flowers grow in clusters. Flowering is followed by round red or blue berries 1–1.5 cm (0.39–0.59 in) in diameter. Each berry contains one to five seeds which are yellow when ripe.

The tree was first described as Sersalisia obovata by Robert Brown in his 1810 work Prodromus Florae Novae Hollandiae, before being moved to its current binomial name by Jean Baptiste Louis Pierre in 1890. It has numerous synonyms. The specific epithet obovata refers to the reverse ovate shape of the leaf. A genetic analysis of material found that material from Papua New Guinea was isolated and was a sister to a group comprising material from Australia and Indonesia. Indumentum was present on the leaf surface of the Australian and Indonesian samples, and absent in material from Papua New Guinea.

It can be grown in conditions with good drainage with sunny aspect, and can be propagated by seed. The wood is used for turning and cabinet-making.

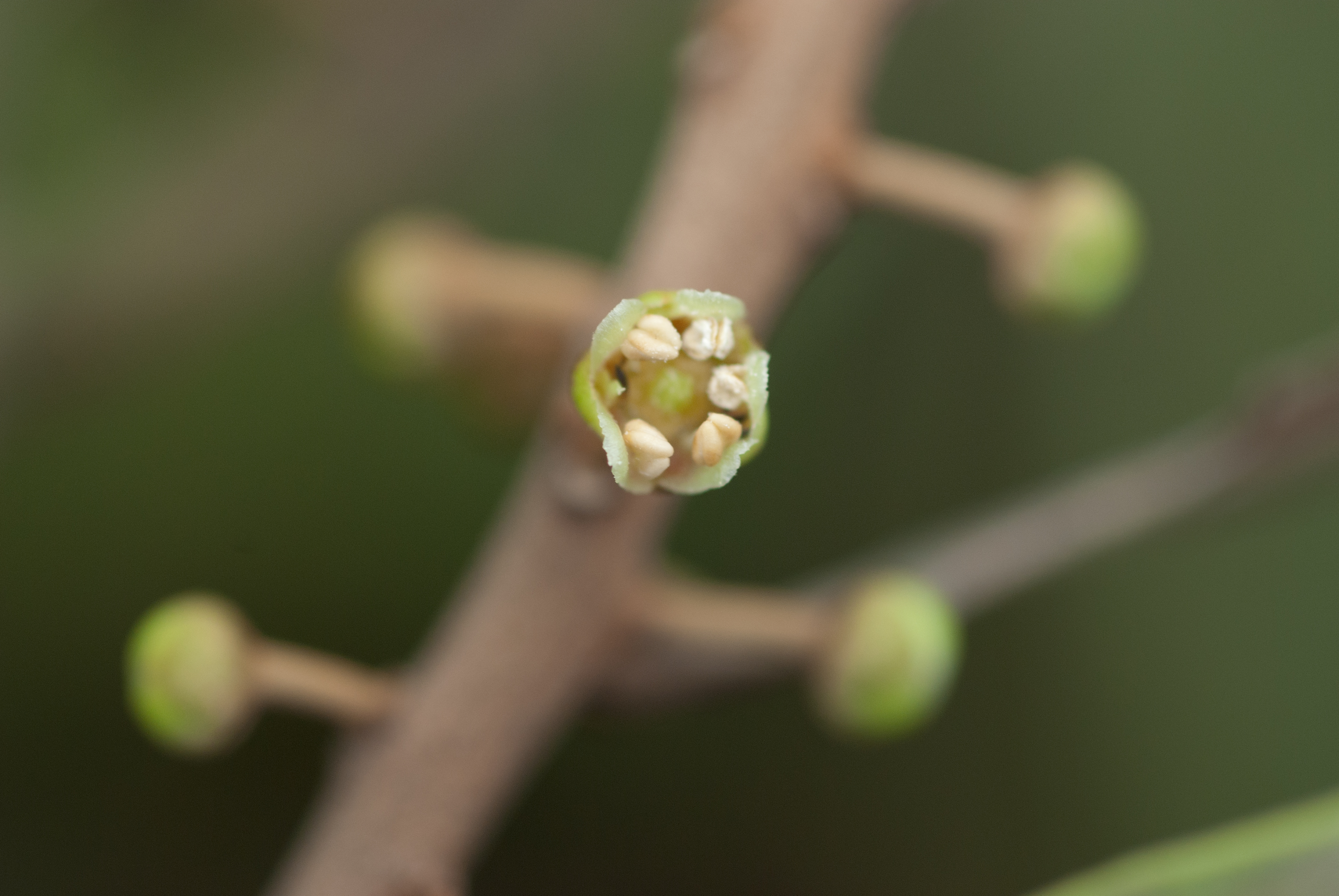

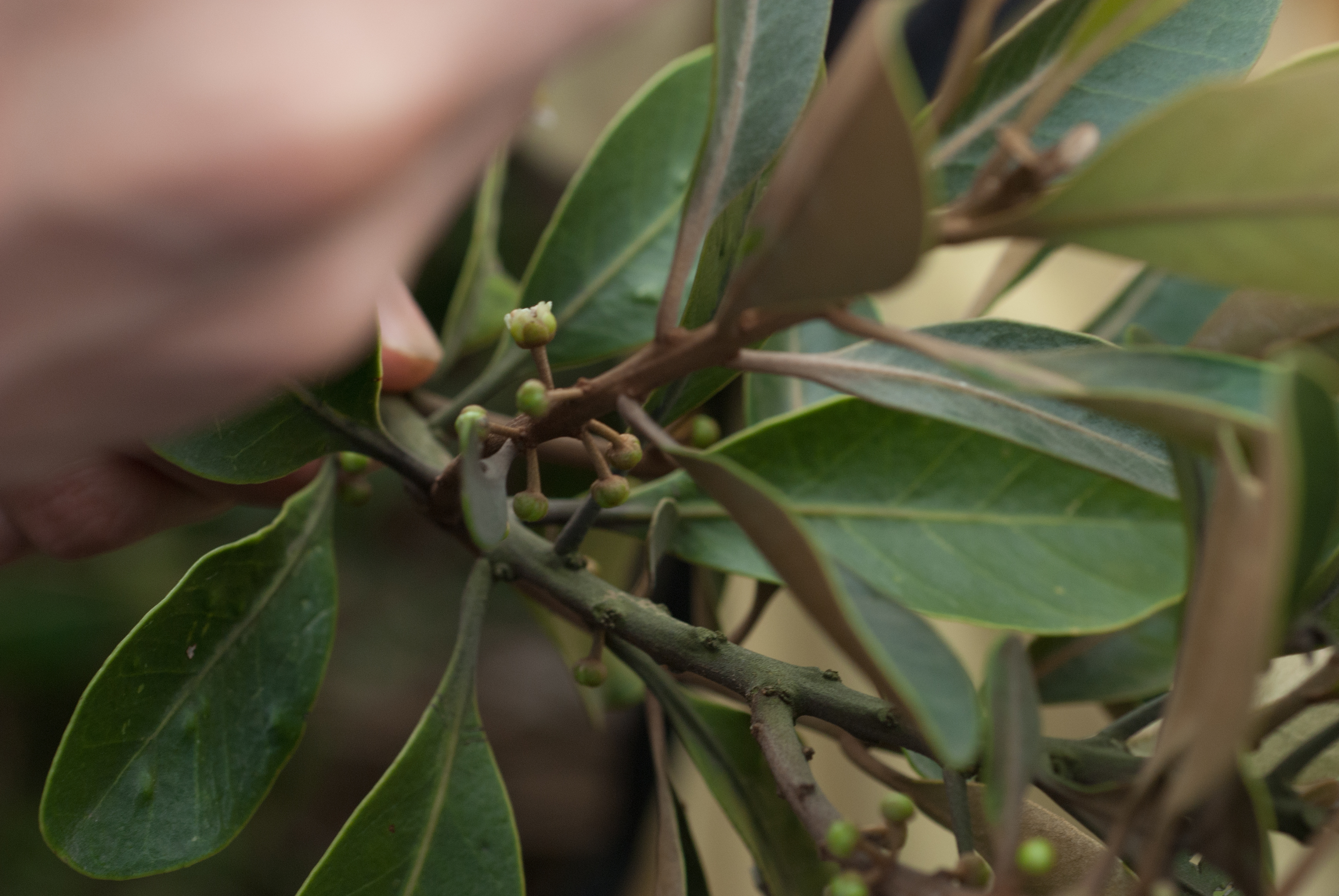

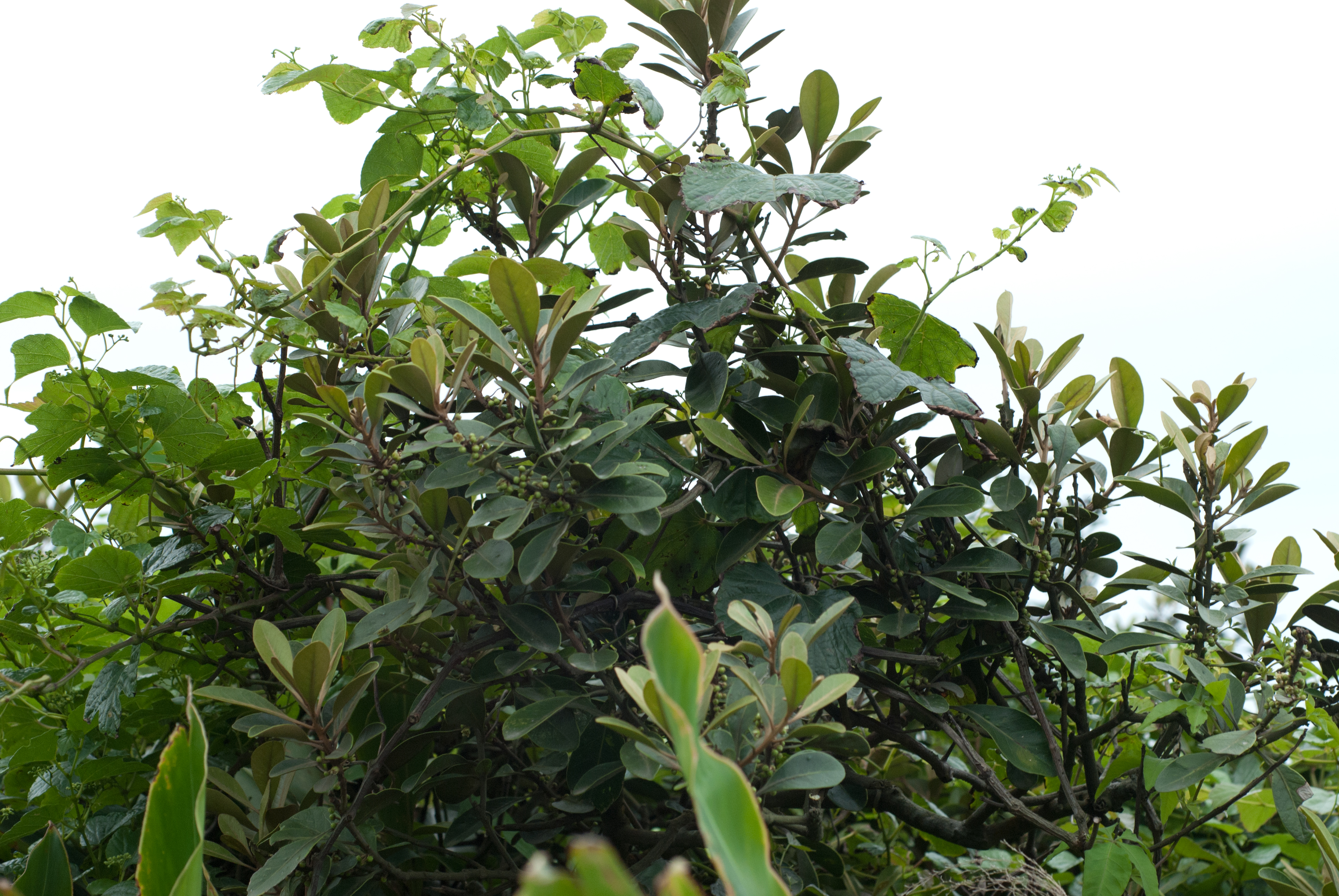
