= Planchonella roseoloba =

Scientific classification
- Kingdom: Plantae
- Clade: Tracheophytes
- Clade: Angiosperms
- Clade: Eudicots
- Clade: Asterids
- Order: Ericales
- Family: Sapotaceae
- Genus: Planchonella
- Species: P. roseoloba

Binomial name
- Planchonella roseoloba Swenson, Munzinger & Bartish, 2007

Species of flowering plant

Planchonella roseoloba is a species of plant in the family Sapotaceae. It is endemic to New Caledonia. As with other species in the same genus, it possesses stamens that are located below (and rarely in) the tube orifice; a multi-seeded fruit, as well as foliaceous cotyledons embedded in endosperm.
