= Planchonella luteocostata =

Scientific classification
- Kingdom: Plantae
- Clade: Tracheophytes
- Clade: Angiosperms
- Clade: Eudicots
- Clade: Asterids
- Order: Ericales
- Family: Sapotaceae
- Genus: Planchonella
- Species: P. luteocostata

Binomial name
- Planchonella luteocostata Swenson, Munzinger & Bartish, 2007

Species of plant

Planchonella luteocostata is a species of plant in the family Sapotaceae. It is endemic to New Caledonia. As with other plants in the same genus, it possesses stamens that are located below (and rarely in) the tube orifice; a multi-seeded fruit, as well as foliaceous cotyledons embedded in endosperm.
