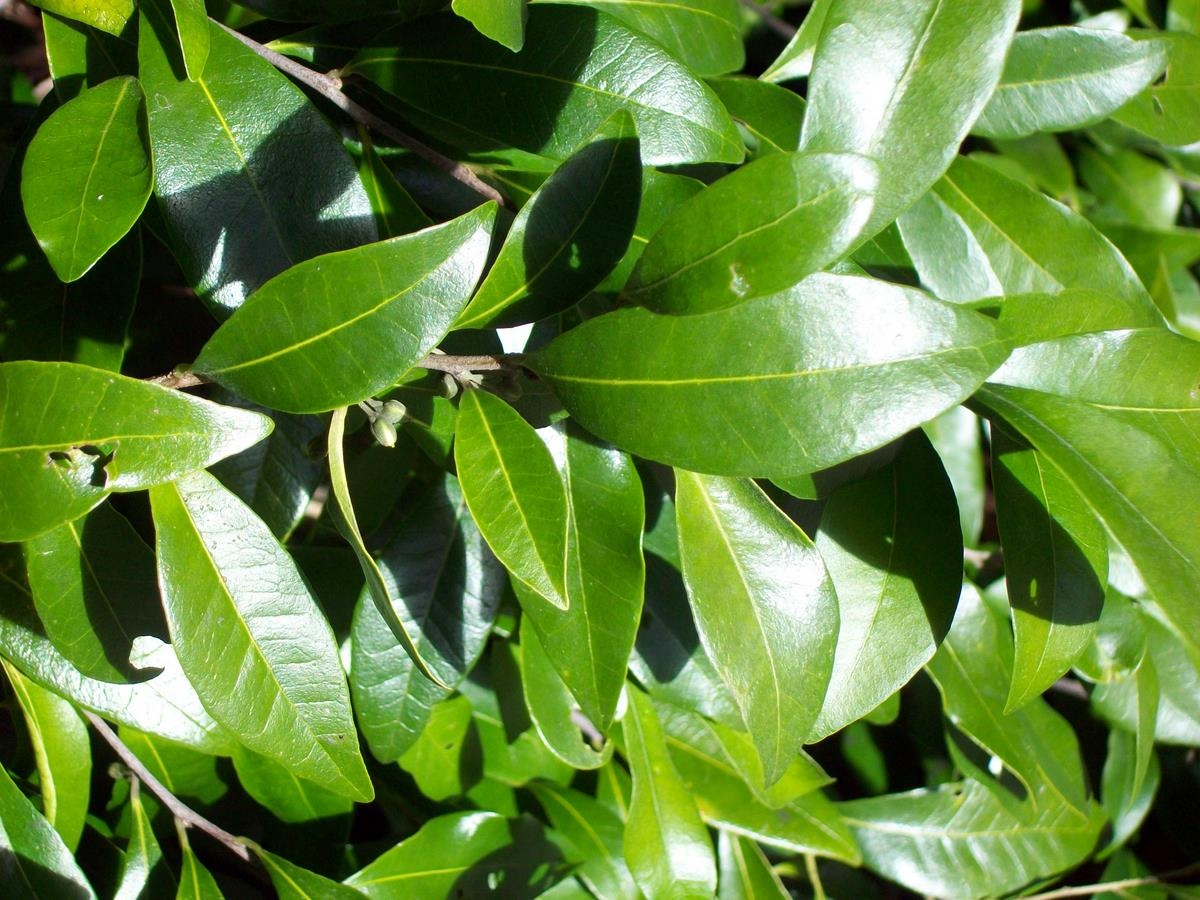
- Planchonella myrsinoides

Scientific classification
- Kingdom: Plantae
- Clade: Tracheophytes
- Clade: Angiosperms
- Clade: Eudicots
- Clade: Asterids
- Order: Ericales
- Family: Sapotaceae
- Genus: Planchonella
- Species: P. myrsinoides

Binomial name
- Planchonella myrsinoides (A.Cunn. ex Benth.) S.T.Blake ex Francis (1951)

Synonyms
- Achras myrsinoides A.Cunn. ex Benth. (1868); Planchonella cotinifolia var. pubescens P.Royen (1957); Planchonella pubescens (P.Royen) Swenson, Munzinger & Bartish (2007); Pouteria cotinifolia var. pubescens (P.Royen) Jessup (2001); Pouteria myrsinoides (A.Cunn. ex Benth.) Baehni (1942); Pouteria myrsinifolia (F.Muell.) Jessup (1942); Sersalisia myrsinoides (A.Cunn. ex Benth.) Domin (1928); Sideroxylon myrsinoides (A.Cunn. ex Benth.) Benth. & Hook.f. ex F.Muell. (1882); Xantolis myrsinoides (A.Cunn. ex Benth.) Baehni (1965)

= Planchonella myrsinoides =

Yellow plumwood

Species of tree

Planchonella myrsinoides is an Australian tree in the family Sapotaceae. The common names include yellow plumwood, axe-handle wood and blunt-leaved coondoo. It occurs in seaside rainforests and drier rainforests from the Forster, New South Wales to the Lakeland Downs in tropical Queensland.

It is a small tree up to 12 metres tall with a stem diameter of 25 cm (9.8 in). The leaves are 2 to 10 cm (0.79 to 3.94 in) long and 1 to 4 cm (0.39 to 1.57 in) wide. Flowering occurs between May and November, sometimes as early as February. The fruit is a thin fleshed, purple/black berry, 1.5 to 3 cm (0.59 to 1.18 in) long, containing one to three seeds.

The specific epithet myrsinoides refers to a similarity of the leaves of certain plants in the genus Myrsine.
