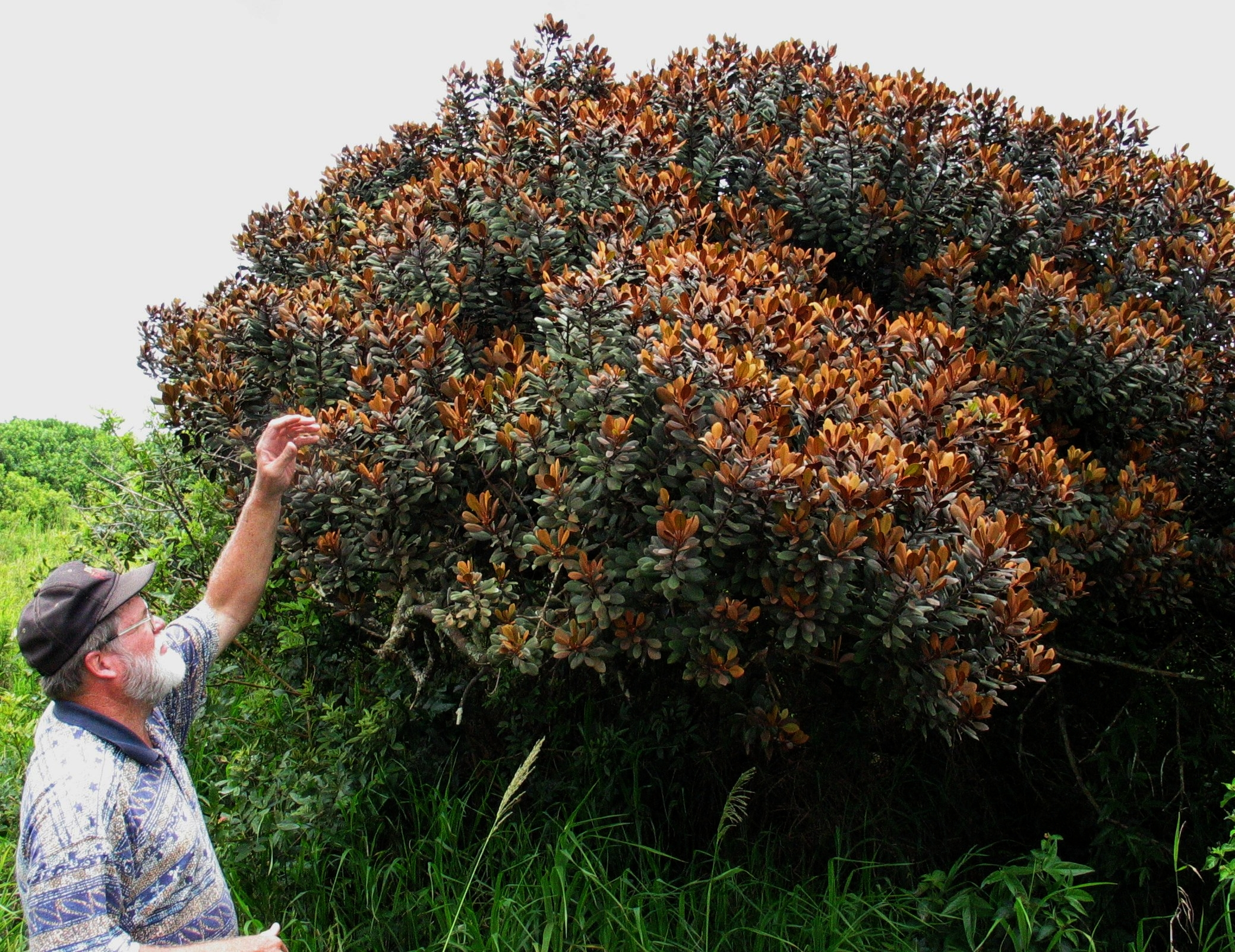
- Planchonella sandwicensis in Hawaii

Scientific classification
- Kingdom: Plantae
- Clade: Embryophytes
- Clade: Tracheophytes
- Clade: Spermatophytes
- Clade: Angiosperms
- Clade: Eudicots
- Clade: Asterids
- Order: Ericales
- Family: Sapotaceae
- Subfamily: Chrysophylloideae
- Genus: Planchonella; Pierre

Type species
- Planchonella obovata (R.Br.) Pierre

Species
- See list of Planchonella species

Synonyms
- Albertisiella Pierre ex Aubrév. (1964); Beauvisagea Pierre (1890); Blabeia Baehni (1964); Boerlagella Pierre ex Cogn. (1891); Boerlagia Pierre (1890), non Boerlagea Cogn.; Bureavella Pierre (1890); Fontbrunea Pierre (1890); Hormogyne A.DC. (1844), nom. rej.; Iteiluma Baill. (1891), nom. superfl.; Krausella H.J.Lam (1932); Peuceluma Baill. (1890); Poissonella Pierre (1890); Pyriluma (Baill.) Aubrév. (1967); Siderocarpus Pierre ex L.Planch. (1888)

= Planchonella =

Genus of trees

Planchonella is a genus of flowering trees in the gutta-percha family, Sapotaceae. It contains around 110 mainly tropical species, which range from the Seychelles through Southeast Asia and New Guinea to northern and eastern Australia, New Zealand, and the Pacific Islands. The highest species diversity of Planchonella is found in New Caledonia and New Guinea.

The type species of the genus is Planchonella obovata.

== Taxonomy ==
The genus was described by the French botanist Jean Baptiste Louis Pierre in 1890. The genus was named in honour of French botanist Jules Émile Planchon.

After its initial describal, Planchonella has gone through multiple rounds of synonymisation with other genera, often being included in Pouteria, and being recognised as a valid genus. In 2007, the genus was reinstated based on a combination of ITS sequences and morphology.

== Description ==
Planchonella species are trees and shrubs of various sizes. The leaves are typically alternate, simple and entire, with distinct venation. The flowers of Planchonella are quite small, with 5-lobed, short and tubular corollas. One distinguishing feature is that the stamens are attached to the corolla tube just below the tube orifice, as opposed to being inserted in the tube orifice as in the closely related Pichonia, or near the base as in Pleioluma.

== Human uses ==
Many species of Planchonella have edible fruits and have historically been a food source native peoples, including the species Planchonella australis found in Northeastern Australia. Planchonella trees have also been harvested for timber.

== Selected species ==
- Planchonella australis (R.Br.) Pierre
- Planchonella contermina Pierre ex Dubard
- Planchonella costata (Endl.) Pierre – tawāpou, bastard ironwood
- Planchonella cotinifolia (A.DC.) Dubard
- Planchonella crenata Munzinger & Swenson
- Planchonella eerwah (F.M.Bailey) P.Royen
- Planchonella glauca Swenson & Munzinger
- Planchonella kaalaensis Aubrév.
- Planchonella latihila Munzinger & Swenson
- Planchonella luteocostata Munzinger & Swenson
- Planchonella maclayana (F.Muell.) Swenson
- Planchonella mandjeliana Munzinger & Swenson
- Planchonella myrsinifolia (F.Muell.) Swenson, Bartish & Munzinger
- Planchonella myrsinoides (A.Cunn. ex Benth.) S.T.Blake ex Francis
- Planchonella pinifolia (Baill.) Dubard
- Planchonella pomifera (Pierre ex Baill.) Dubard
- Planchonella povilana Swenson & Munzinger
- Planchonella reticulata (Baill.) Pierre ex Dubard
- Planchonella roseoloba Munzinger & Swenson
- Planchonella rufocostata Munzinger & Swenson
- Planchonella spectabilis (Miq.) Dubard
- Planchonella torricellensis (K.Schum.) H.J.Lam
- Planchonella tahitensis (Nadeaud) Pierre ex Dubard
