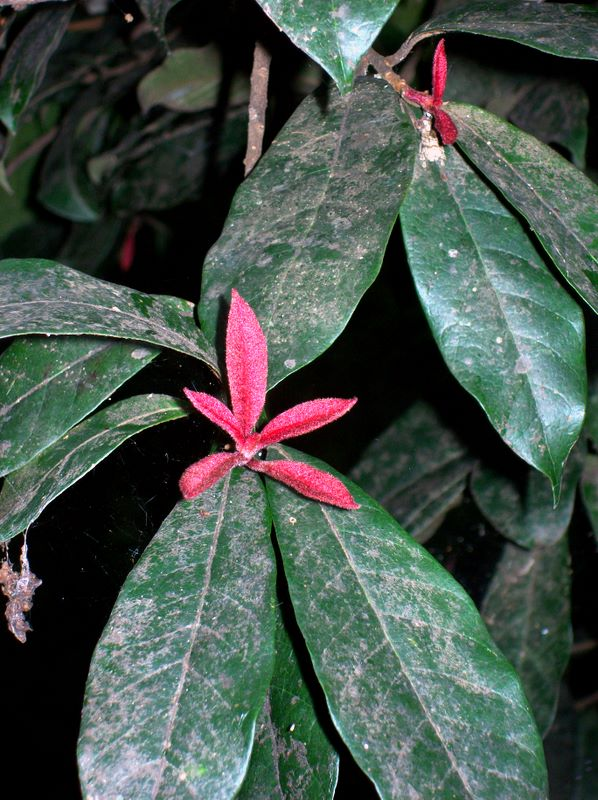
- Niemeyera whitei

Scientific classification
- Kingdom: Plantae
- Clade: Tracheophytes
- Clade: Angiosperms
- Clade: Eudicots
- Clade: Asterids
- Order: Ericales
- Family: Sapotaceae
- Subfamily: Chrysophylloideae
- Genus: Niemeyera; F.Muell. 1870, conserved name, not F.Muell. 1867 (syn of Apostasia in Orchidaceae)

= Niemeyera =

Genus of flowering plants

Niemeyera is a genus of plants in the family Sapotaceae described as a genus in 1870. The entire genus is endemic to Australia (States of Queensland and New South Wales). Its closest relative is Pycnandra from New Caledonia.

== Species ==
Four species are accepted.

- Niemeyera chartacea (F.M.Bailey) C.T.White - Queensland
- Niemeyera discolor Jessup – Queensland
- Niemeyera prunifera (F.Muell.) F.Muell. - Queensland
- Niemeyera whitei (Aubrév.) Jessup - Queensland, New South Wales

formerly included

now in other genera: Amorphospermum Chrysophyllum Pycnandra

- N. acuminata - Pycnandra acuminata
- N.antiloga - Amorphospermum antilogum
- N. balansae - Pycnandra balansae
- N. deplanchei - Pycnandra deplanchei
- N. francii - Pycnandra francii
- N. gatopensis - Pycnandra blanchonii
- N. lissophylla - Pycnandra lissophylla
- N. papuana - Chrysophyllum roxburghii
- N. sessilifolia - Pycnandra sessilifolia

homonym genus

In 1867, Muller used the name Niemeyera to refer to a very different plant, now placed in the Orchidaceae. This name, although older than the 1870 name in the Sapotaceae, is now considered a rejected name. Hence:

- Niemeyera F.Muell. 1867 - syn of Apostasia Blume 1825
- Niemeyera stylidioides F.Muell. - syn of Apostasia wallichii R.Br.
