= Pittosporum kororoense =

Scientific classification
- Kingdom: Plantae
- Clade: Embryophytes
- Clade: Tracheophytes
- Clade: Angiosperms
- Clade: Eudicots
- Clade: Asterids
- Order: Apiales
- Family: Pittosporaceae
- Genus: Pittosporum
- Species: P. kororoense

Binomial name
- Pittosporum kororoense Benwell

Synonyms
- Pittosporum sp. Coffs Harbour A.S.Benwell

Species of shrub endemic to Australia

Pittosporum kororoense, also known as Big Banana Pittosporum, is a critically endangered species of flowering shrub in the family Pittosporaceae and is endemic to a small distribution north of Coffs Harbour in New South Wales, Australia.

== Description ==
Pittosporum kororoense is a small shrub, growing up to 1.5 metres (4 ft 11 in) tall. It typically occurs in dense clonal colonies 1–4 m (3 ft 3 in – 13 ft 1 in) in diameter with individual stems arising from horizontal underground rhizomes. It may also form smaller groups of less than 10 stems, or occur as single plants. Stems have grey-brown bark and multiple petiole or branchlet scars. Leaves are alternate, becoming whorled towards the end of branchlets, oblanceolate to obovate and elliptical, glabrous, up to 85–112 mm (3.3–4.4 in) long and 22–30 mm (0.87–1.18 in) wide on a petiole up to 5–8 mm (0.20–0.31 in) long. The midvein is slightly raised on the ventral surface of the leaf which is paler than the dark green dorsal surface.

Flowers are radially symmetrical and unisexual, occurring in inflorescences of 1–3 in terminal leaf whorls on a shoot up to 10 mm (0.39 in) long. Sepals are up to 5 mm (0.20 in) long, linear/acuminate and narrow, petals 10–11 mm (0.39–0.43 in) long, 3 mm (0.12 in) wide, creamy yellow when young and becoming darker yellow as they mature. Only male flowers with vestigial pistils have been observed. Stamens are 6–8 mm (0.24–0.31 in) long with anthers nearly 2 mm (0.079 in) long. The pistil up to 7 mm (0.28 in) long and the ovary is barely differentiated, 2 mm (0.079 in) long on a 2 mm (0.079 in) long stipe from the basal nectary gland. The style is (0.16 in) long with the stigma underdeveloped.

Fruit is a hairless, warty capsule 8–12 mm (0.31–0.47 in) long and 10 mm (0.39 in) in diameter, held upright on a pedicel. It is green when unripe, turning yellow or orange when it ripens, and contains 2–6 seeds inside, measuring up to 5 mm (0.20 in) long with a fleshy red outer layer. The seeds and inside of fruit valves are covered in a sticky, resinous substance. Flowering is abrupt and occurs for 5–6 weeks, beginning in late August and commencing towards the end of September. Fruits ripen during March and April.

== Taxonomy ==
Pittosporum kororoense was first formally described in 2023 by Andrew S. Benwell from the holotype specimen collected in January 2021. This was during a flora survey for the Coffs Harbour Bypass project in preparation for the translocation of Niemeyera whitei, a threatened plant species. This specimen, unidentified at time, was believed to possibly belong to the Pittosporaceae family. It was later confirmed to belong to the genus Pittosporum in April that year after specimens with fruits were collected and sent to the National Herbarium of New South Wales. It was then identified as a new species in September after additional specimens with flowers were collected and studied, and was given the designation Pittosporum sp. Coffs Harbour. The morphological differences of the specimens compared to described Pittosporum species, as well as unpublished genetic analysis by the Royal Botanic Gardens in Sydney fully warranted the classification of a separate species.

The common name, Big Banana Pittosporum, is named after the tourist attraction, the Big Banana, located 0.5km from these first described specimens. The specific epithet kororoense refers to the suburb of Korora (alternately spelled Kororo) where the specimens were found.

== Distribution and habitat ==
This species is highly localised and endemic to Kororo, 3 km north of Coffs Harbour in the Mid North Coast of New South Wales, Australia. Approximately 70 patches have been recorded with a total of approximately 4,000 stems. These are most likely to be clonal, so the actual number of genetic individual plants may be low. About 30 of these (which consists of 40% of the known total population) occur in a narrow strip of remnant rainforest vegetation along 1 km of Jordans Creek at Kororo.

== Ecology ==
Fruits are rare as the species primarily reproduces by asexual means through suckering. Only male flowers have been found during a search of all known populations in 2021–22. Pittosporum species in Australia are generally dioecious, though in other species, fruits have occasionally been found on 'male' plants and flowers with fertile anthers found in 'female' plants. This has been observed in Pittosporum spinescens and is believed to be triggered by variations in climate conditions.
