= Neuwiedia borneensis =

Scientific classification
- Kingdom: Plantae
- Clade: Tracheophytes
- Clade: Angiosperms
- Clade: Monocots
- Order: Asparagales
- Family: Orchidaceae
- Subfamily: Apostasioideae
- Genus: Neuwiedia
- Species: N. borneensis

Binomial name
- Neuwiedia borneensis de Vogel

Species of plant

Neuwiedia borneensis is a plant in the family Orchidaceae. It grows in Borneo.
