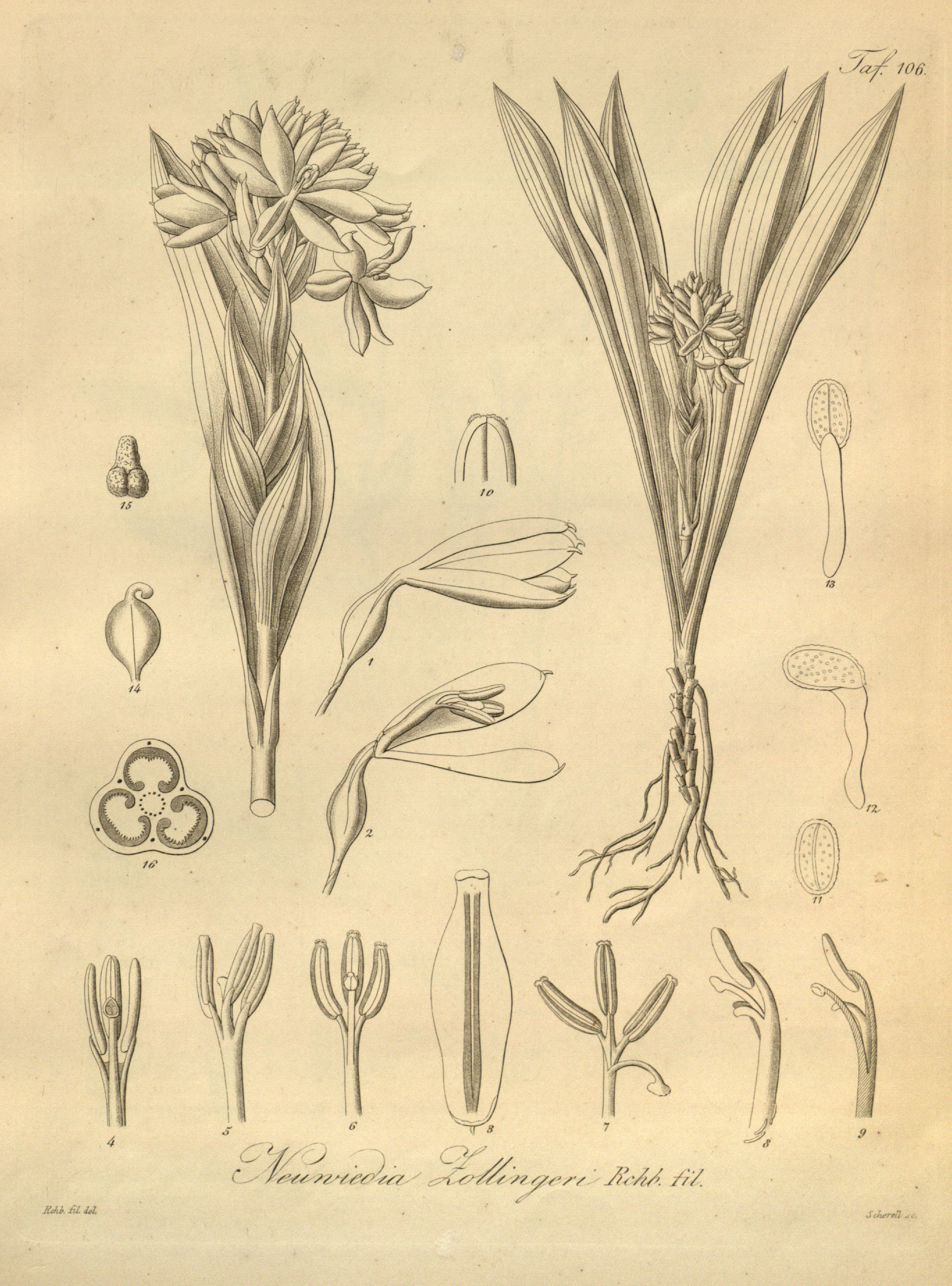
- 1857 illustration

Scientific classification
- Kingdom: Plantae
- Clade: Tracheophytes
- Clade: Angiosperms
- Clade: Monocots
- Order: Asparagales
- Family: Orchidaceae
- Subfamily: Apostasioideae
- Genus: Neuwiedia
- Species: N. zollingeri

Binomial name
- Neuwiedia zollingeri Rchb.f.

= Neuwiedia zollingeri =

Species of orchid

Neuwiedia zollingeri is a species of orchid that native to Hainan, Hong Kong, Yunnan, Borneo, Sumatra, Java, Bali, Malaysia, Singapore, Thailand, Vietnam.

== Varieties ==
Four varieties are recognised as of June 2014:

1. Neuwiedia zollingeri var. annamensis (Gagnep.) Aver - Vietnam
2. Neuwiedia zollingeri var. javanica (J.J.Sm.) de Vogel - Vietnam, Borneo, Sumatra, Java, Bali
3. Neuwiedia zollingeri var. singapureana (Wall. ex Baker) de Vogel - Hainan, Hong Kong, Yunnan, Thailand, Vietnam, Borneo, Sumatra, Malaysia
4. Neuwiedia zollingeri var. zollingeri - Sumatra, Java
