= Chrysophyllum elegans =

Chrysophyllum elegans may refer to:

Eudicots, asterids, order Ericales:

- Chrysophyllum elegans Raunk. ex Warm., a synonym for Chrysophyllum flexuosum, a tree (Sapotaceae) found in Brazil
- Chrysophyllum elegans (Vink) Baehni, a synonym for Pycnandra decandra subsp. coriacea, a tree (Sapotaceae) found in New Caledonia
