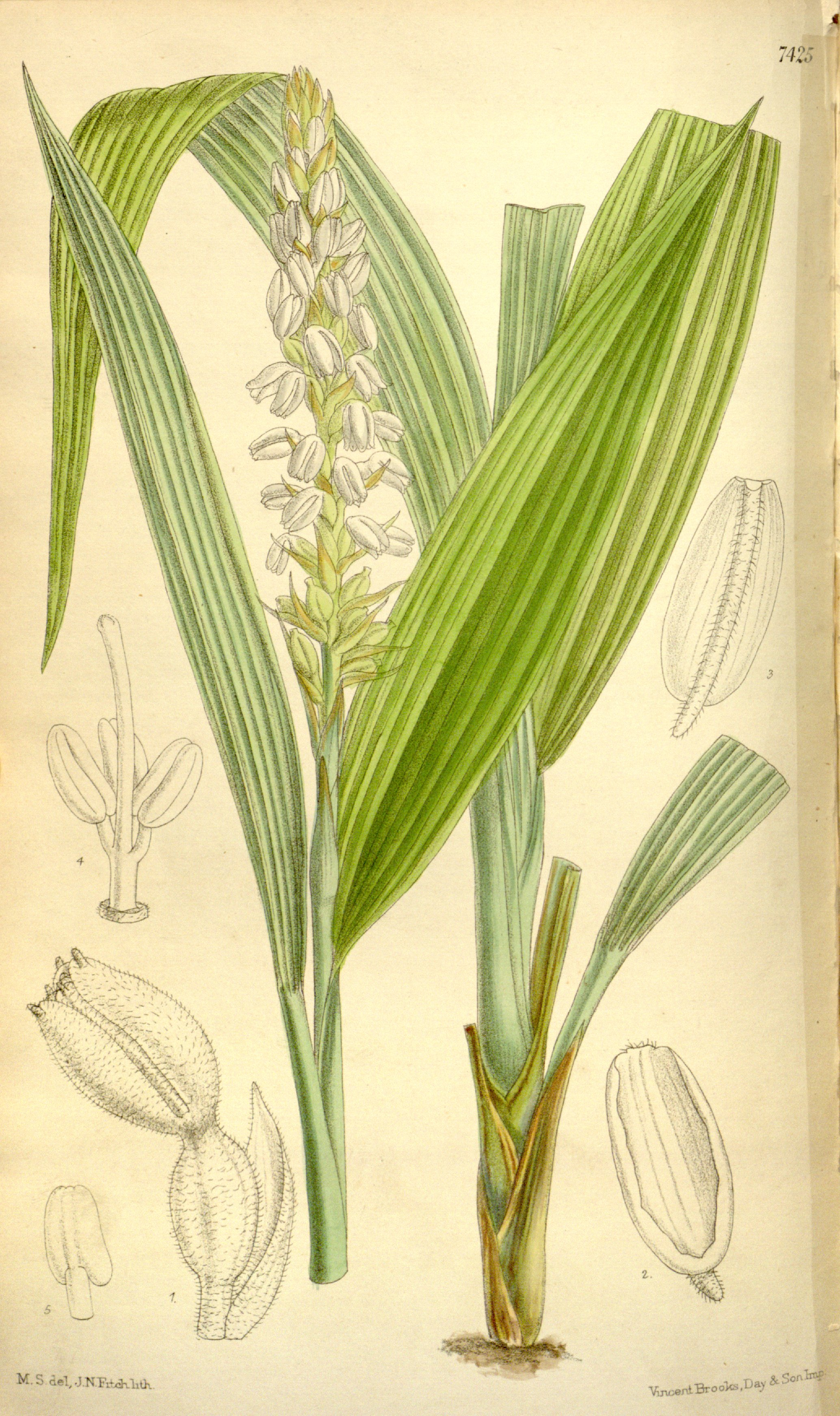
- 1874 illustration from Curtis's Botanical Magazine

Scientific classification
- Kingdom: Plantae
- Clade: Tracheophytes
- Clade: Angiosperms
- Clade: Monocots
- Order: Asparagales
- Family: Orchidaceae
- Subfamily: Apostasioideae
- Genus: Neuwiedia
- Species: N. griffithii

Binomial name
- Neuwiedia griffithii Rchb.f.

= Neuwiedia griffithii =

Species of orchid

Neuwiedia griffithii is a species of orchid that occurs from Vietnam, peninsular Malaysia to northern Sumatra.
