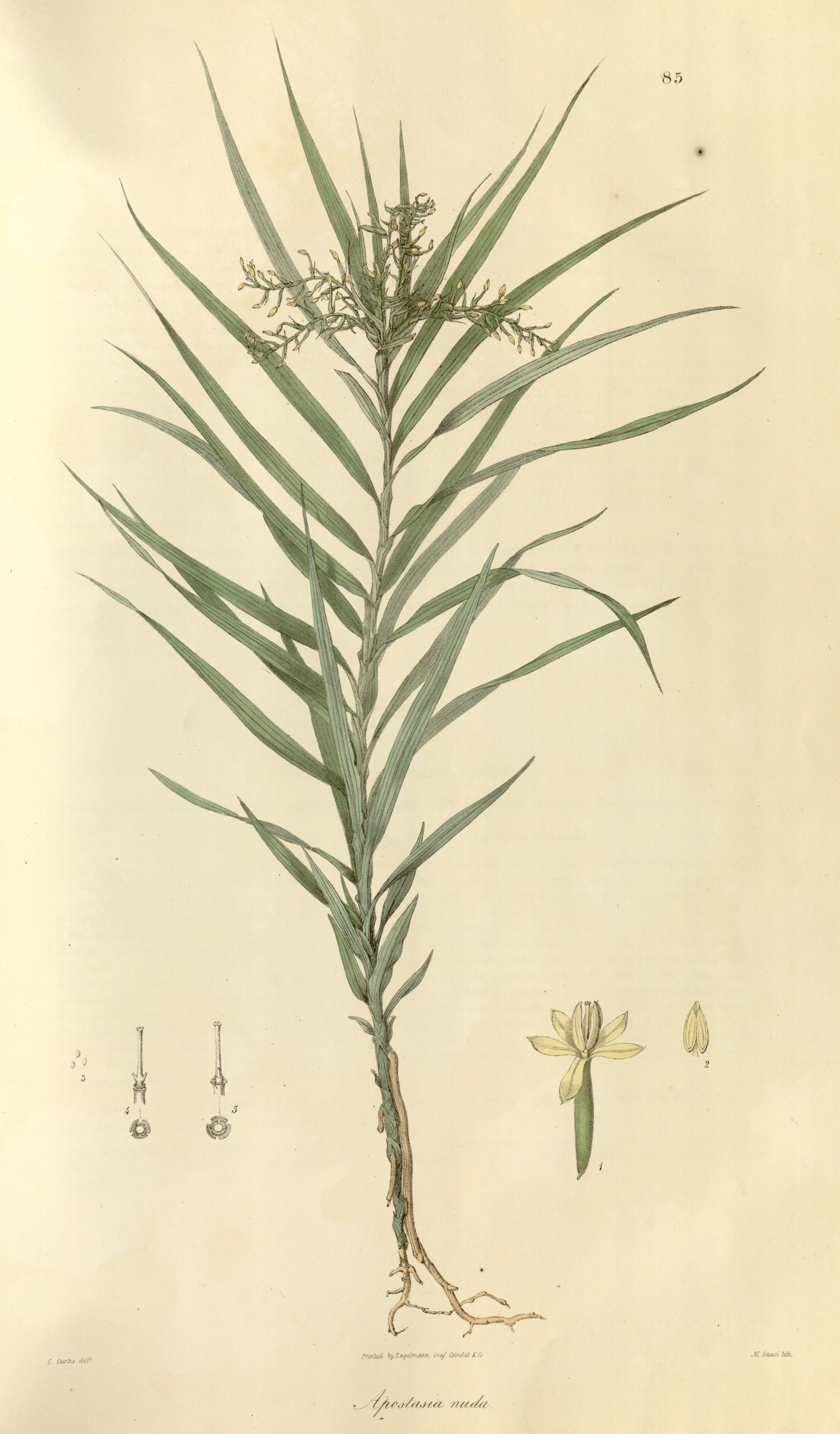

Conservation status
- CITES Appendix II

Scientific classification
- Kingdom: Plantae
- Clade: Tracheophytes
- Clade: Angiosperms
- Clade: Monocots
- Order: Asparagales
- Family: Orchidaceae
- Subfamily: Apostasioideae
- Genus: Apostasia
- Species: A. nuda

Binomial name
- Apostasia nuda R.Br.

Synonyms
- Apostasia brunonis Griff.; Apostasia lobbii Rchb.f.; Adactylus lobbii (Rchb.f.) Rolfe; Adactylus nudus (R.Br.) Rolfe; Adactylus nudus var. laxus Blume ex Siebe; Adactylus nudus var. validus Blume ex Siebe; Adactylus brunonis (Griff.) Cretz.; Adactylus nudus var. laxus Blume ex Siebe; Adactylus nudus var. validus Blume ex Siebe

= Apostasia nuda =

Species of orchid

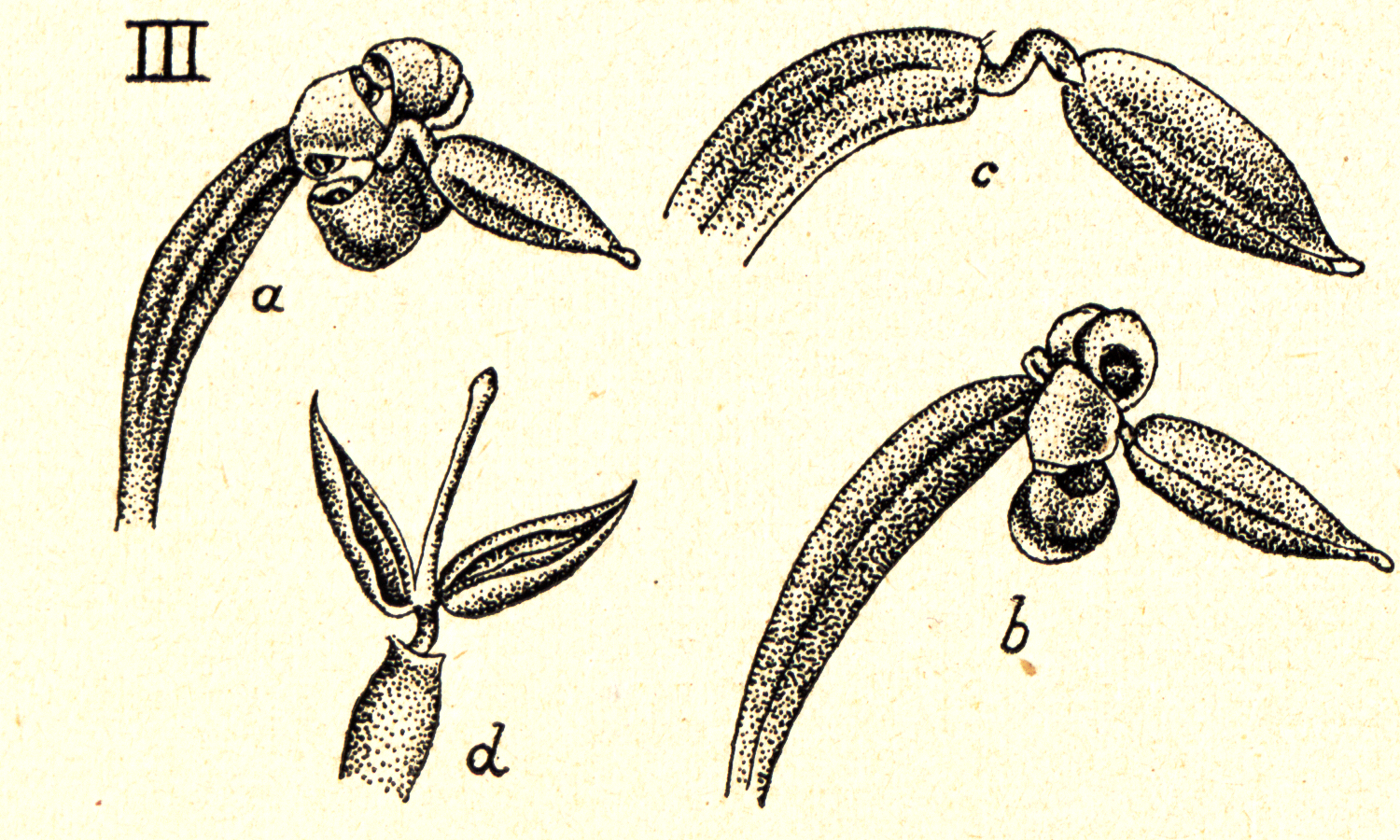
Apostasia nuda R.Br. Pictured.

Apostasia nuda, or Grass Orchid, is a terrestrial orchid within the Orchidaceae family and the Apostasioideae subfamily. Most commonly found in the Mainland and Islands of Southeast Asia, this species remains native to Singapore. This perennial growing shrub is considered “critically endangered” in regions of Singapore due to deforestation and environmental pressures.

== Description ==
A. nuda grows from a thin rhizome with fibrous roots, forming an erect stem that can reach up to 30-70 cm tall. Appearing similar to grass, the leaves are lanceolate to linear shaped, with parallel venation and alternate and distichous arrangements along the stem. The leaf dimensions range from 10-30 cm long and 1-3 cm wide.

The inflorescence is terminal bearing several radially symmetrical flowers in the upper leaf axils. Each flower is small, measuring approximately 1-2 cm in diameter, appears in either a pale yellow, creamy white, or white color. There are three sepals and three petals. Both are very similar in size and shape and number, allowing them to be considered tepals. These tepals are unfused to each other and bend outward. The dimensions range from 3-5mm long and reaching up to 1mm wide.

Not to be confused with the regular perianth whorl, the labellum is a modified petal known as the “lip” that is distinct to orchids only. In A. nuda, the labellum is unlobed and concave. Although there is poor differentiation from the other unmodified perianth whorls, the lip may curve slightly backward instead.

In the reproductive parts of the flower, two or sometimes three fertile are seen with some fusion seen at the base of the filaments. This is a characteristic feature of the genus Apostasia and unusual within Orchidaceae, where a single stamen is observed. The ovary is seen as inferior with a three lobed stigma at the end.

After pollination, the flowers develop into their fruit which are seen as long capsules that dehisce when matured. Once the capsules are split open, many small seeds are released and usually wind-dispersed.

== Distribution and habitat ==
Apostasia nuda is distributed across tropical South and Southeast Asia, where it flourishes in the forest undergrowths and outskirts, sometimes rarely blooming in open grassy areas with well drained soils.

Although this specimen is considered annual as flowering occurs year-round, the flowering time actually is dependent by region. Generally blooming in its native tropical habitats, flowering peaks during the warmer, wetter months where there is increased humidity and rainfall.

== Taxonomy ==
After studying herbarium specimens from Southeast Asia, Apostasia nuda was first was officially described by botanist Robert Brown in 1830 in Nathaniel Wallich's Plantae Asiaticae Rariores.

In the 19th century, botanists like William Griffith, who collected specimens from India and Burma, aided in the characterization of the specimen’s identity in the Apostasioideae subfamily. By the 20th century, researchers such as Rudolf Schlechter and Johannes Pfitzer further studied the specimen’s morphology and ecological interactions, confirming A. nuda's early branching in the orchid family tree.
