= Pycnandra goroensis =

Conservation status
- Critically Endangered (IUCN 3.1)

Scientific classification
- Kingdom: Plantae
- Clade: Tracheophytes
- Clade: Angiosperms
- Clade: Eudicots
- Clade: Asterids
- Order: Ericales
- Family: Sapotaceae
- Genus: Pycnandra
- Species: P. goroensis

Binomial name
- Pycnandra goroensis (Aubrév.) Munzinger & Swenson

Synonyms
- Leptostylis goroensis Aubrév.

Species of plant

Pycnandra goroensis is a species of plant in the family Sapotaceae. It is endemic to New Caledonia.
