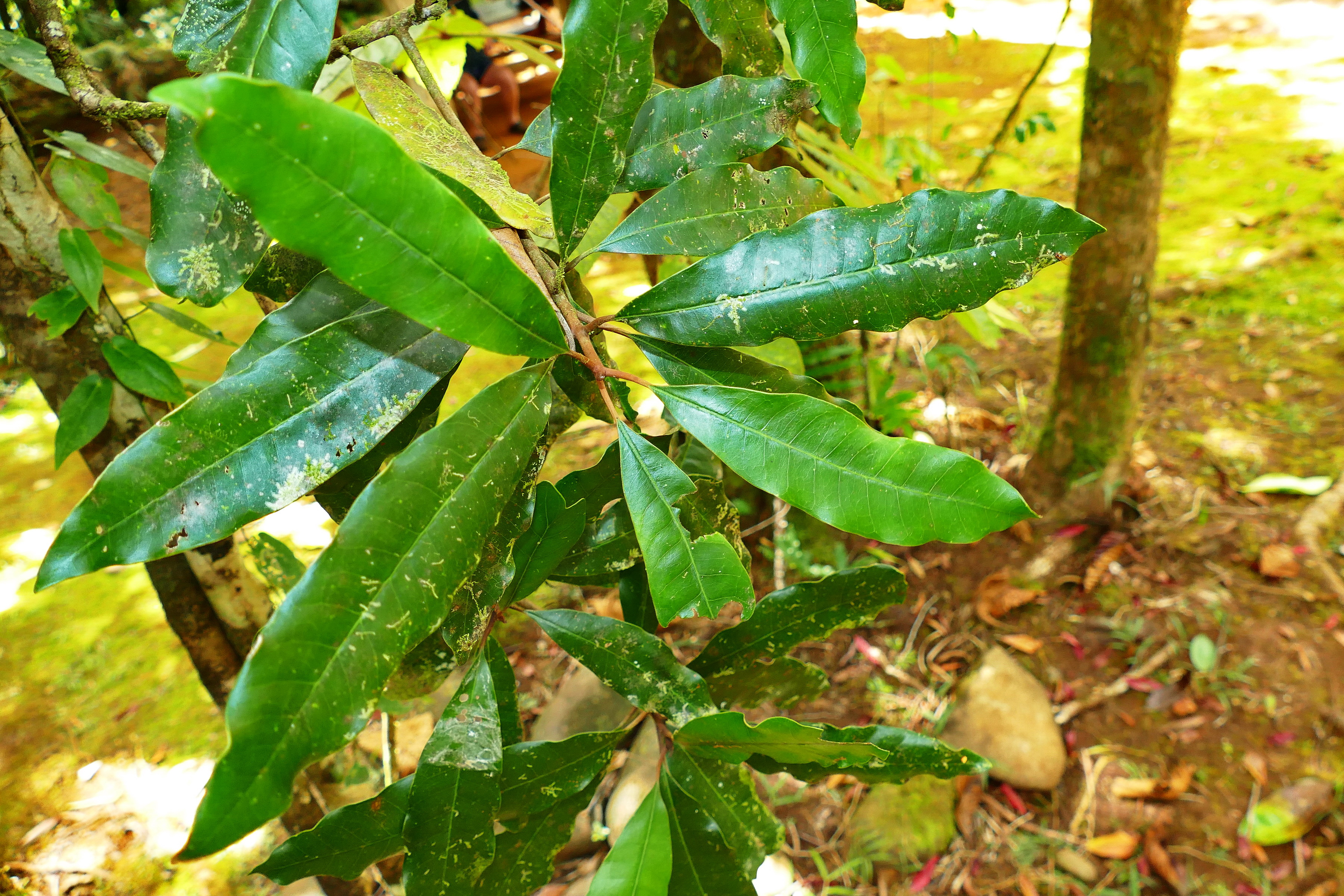
- Pycnandra acuminata

Scientific classification
- Kingdom: Plantae
- Clade: Tracheophytes
- Clade: Angiosperms
- Clade: Eudicots
- Clade: Asterids
- Order: Ericales
- Family: Sapotaceae
- Subfamily: Chrysophylloideae
- Genus: Pycnandra; Benth.

Synonyms
- Achradotypus Baill.; Chorioluma Baill.; Corbassona Aubrév.; Heteromera Montrouz. ex Beauvis.; Jollya Pierre ex Baill.; Leptostylis Benth.; Ochrothallus Pierre ex Baill.; Sebertia Pierre ex Engl. & Prantl; Tropalanthe S.Moore; Trouettia Pierre ex Baill.

= Pycnandra =

Genus of flowering plants

Pycnandra is a genus of trees in the family Sapotaceae described as a genus in 1876.

It is the largest endemic genus of flowering plants of New Caledonia. Its closest relative is the Australian Niemeyera.

== Species ==
As of December 2025, Plants of the World Online accepts the following 62 species:

- Pycnandra acuminata (Pierre ex Baill.) Swenson & Munzinger
- Pycnandra amplexicaulis Munzinger & Swenson
- Pycnandra atrofusca Swenson & Munzinger
- Pycnandra balansae (Baill.) Swenson & Munzinger
- Pycnandra belepensis Swenson & Munzinger
- Pycnandra benthamii Baill.
- Pycnandra blaffartii Swenson & Munzinger
- Pycnandra blanchonii (Aubrév.) Swenson & Munzinger
- Pycnandra bourailensis Swenson & Munzinger
- Pycnandra bracteolata Swenson & Munzinger
- Pycnandra caeruleilatex Swenson & Munzinger
- Pycnandra canaliculata Swenson & Munzinger
- Pycnandra carinocostata Vink
- Pycnandra chartacea Vink
- Pycnandra comptonii (S.Moore) Vink
- Pycnandra comptonioides Swenson & Munzinger
- Pycnandra confusa Swenson & Munzinger
- Pycnandra controversa (Guillaumin) Vink
- Pycnandra cylindricarpa Swenson & Munzinger
- Pycnandra decandra (Montrouz.) Vink
- Pycnandra deplanchei (Baill.) Swenson & Munzinger
- Pycnandra elliptica Swenson & Munzinger
- Pycnandra fastuosa (Baill.) Vink
- Pycnandra filipes (Benth.) Munzinger & Swenson
- Pycnandra francii (Guillaumin & Dubard) Swenson & Munzinger
- Pycnandra glabella Swenson & Munzinger
- Pycnandra glaberrima Swenson & Munzinger
- Pycnandra gordoniifolia (S.Moore) Swenson & Munzinger
- Pycnandra goroensis (Aubrév.) Munzinger & Swenson
- Pycnandra grandifolia (Vink) Munzinger & Swenson
- Pycnandra griseosepala Vink
- Pycnandra heteromera (Vink) Swenson & Munzinger
- Pycnandra intermedia (Baill.) Swenson & Munzinger
- Pycnandra kaalaensis Aubrév.
- Pycnandra kopetoensis Munzinger & Swenson
- Pycnandra kouakouensis Swenson & Munzinger
- Pycnandra linearifolia Swenson & Munzinger
- Pycnandra lissophylla (Pierre ex Baill.) Swenson & Munzinger
- Pycnandra litseiflora (Guillaumin) Swenson & Munzinger
- Pycnandra longiflora (Benth.) Munzinger & Swenson
- Pycnandra longipetiolata Swenson & Munzinger
- Pycnandra margueriteae Munzinger & Swenson
- † Pycnandra micrantha (Beauvis.) Munzinger & Swenson
- Pycnandra montana Swenson & Munzinger
- Pycnandra neocaledonica (S.Moore) Vink
- Pycnandra obscurinerva (Vink) Swenson & Munzinger
- Pycnandra ouaiemensis Swenson & Munzinger
- Pycnandra paniensis Aubrév.
- Pycnandra paucinervia Swenson & Munzinger
- Pycnandra perplexa Swenson & Gâteblé
- Pycnandra petiolata (Vink) Munzinger & Swenson
- Pycnandra poindimiensis Swenson & Munzinger
- Pycnandra pubiflora Swenson & Munzinger
- Pycnandra sarlinii (Aubrév.) Swenson & Munzinger
- Pycnandra schmidii (Aubrév.) Swenson & Munzinger
- Pycnandra sclerophylla Munzinger & Swenson
- Pycnandra sessiliflora Swenson & Munzinger
- Pycnandra sessilifolia (Pancher & Sebert) Swenson & Munzinger
- Pycnandra versicolor Swenson & Munzinger
- Pycnandra vieillardii (Baill.) Vink
- Pycnandra viridifolia Swenson & Munzinger
- Pycnandra wagapensis (Guillaumin) Munzinger & Swenson
