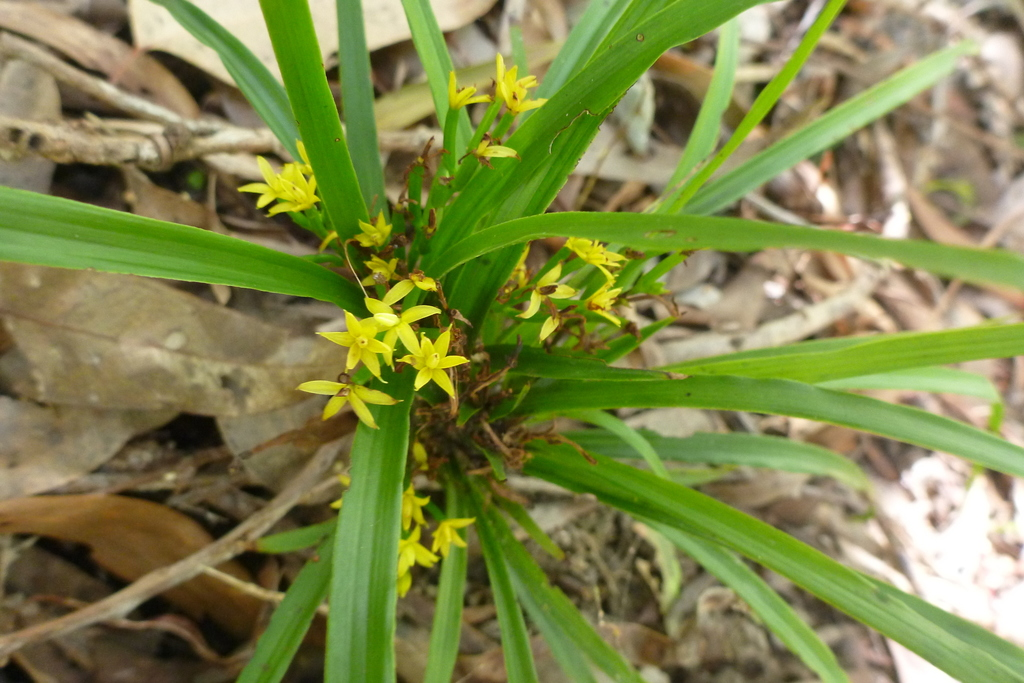
- Apostasia wallachii growing near Cairns

Conservation status
- CITES Appendix II (CITES)

Scientific classification
- Kingdom: Plantae
- Clade: Tracheophytes
- Clade: Angiosperms
- Clade: Monocots
- Order: Asparagales
- Family: Orchidaceae
- Subfamily: Apostasioideae
- Genus: Apostasia
- Species: A. wallichii

Binomial name
- Apostasia wallichii R.Br.

Synonyms
- List: Apostasia alba Rolfe; Apostasia curvata J.J.Sm.; Apostasia gracilis Rolfe; Apostasia lucida Blume ex Siebe; Apostasia nipponica Masam.; Apostasia papuana Schltr.; Apostasia stylidioides (F.Muell.) Rchb.f.; Apostasia wallichii subsp. nipponica (Masam.) Masam.; Apostasia wallichii R.Br. subsp. wallichii; Apostasia wallichii var. nipponica (Masam.) Masam.; Apostasia wallichii var. seraweiensis J.J.Sm.; Apostasia wallichii R.Br. var. wallichii; Mesodactylis deflexa Wall. nom. inval., nom. nud.; Niemeyera stylidioides F.Muell.; Niemeyere stylidioides Dockrill orth. var.

= Apostasia wallichii =

Yellow grass orchid

Species of orchid

Apostasia wallichii, commonly known as the yellow grass orchid, is a species of orchid that is native to India, Japan, China, Southeast Asia, New Guinea and northern Australia. It has many arching, dark green, grass-like leaves and up to forty small, star-like yellow flowers arranged on a branched flowering stem. It mainly grows in wet forest and rainforest.

== Description ==
Apostasia wallichii is a terrestrial, tuberous, evergreen herb, scarcely recognisable as an orchid. It has wiry, branched roots with fleshy, warty projections and an erect, fibrous stem with many grass-like leaves arranged in whorls along it. The leaves are dark green, thin and leathery 100–200 mm (4–8 in) long and up to 1 mm (0.04 in) wide. Between five and forty star-like, yellow flowers, 8–10 mm (0.3–0.4 in) wide are arranged on branched flowering stems 50–100 mm (2–4 in) long and arising from leaf axils. The three sepals and three petals are all similar in size (4–6 mm (0.16–0.24 in) long, 1–1.5 mm (0.04–0.06 in) wide), shape (narrow triangular) and colour. Flowering occurs between December and March in Australia and in August in China.

== Taxonomy and naming ==
Apostasia wallichii was first formally described in 1830 by Robert Brown. Brown's manuscript was published in Nathaniel Wallich's book, Plantae Asiaticae Rariores. The specific epithet (wallichii) honours Nathaniel Wallich.

== Distribution and habitat ==
The yellow grass orchid grows in tropical forest and rainforest, sometimes near streams at altitudes of up to 1,000 m (3,000 ft). It is found in Hainan, south-west Yunnan, Bangladesh, Cambodia, India, Indonesia, southern Japan, Nepal, Malaysia, Myanmar, Sri Lanka, Thailand, Vietnam, the Philippines, New Guinea and Queensland where if occurs between Bamaga and Ingham.
