= Donella (plant) =

Scientific classification
- Kingdom: Plantae
- Clade: Tracheophytes
- Clade: Angiosperms
- Clade: Eudicots
- Clade: Asterids
- Order: Ericales
- Family: Sapotaceae
- Subfamily: Chrysophylloideae
- Genus: Donella; Pierre ex Baill. (1891)

Synonyms
- Austrogambeya Aubrév. & Pellegr. (1961)

Genus of plants

Donella is a genus of flowering plants belonging to the family Sapotaceae.

Its wide native range extends from tropical and subtropical Old World to northern Queensland. It is found in (listed alphabetically) Angola, Assam, Bangladesh, Benin, Borneo, Cambodia, Cameroon, Central African Republic, China, Republic of Congo, Democratic Republic of the Congo, Eswatini, Gabon, Ghana, Guinea, Hainan, India, Ivory Coast, Java, Kenya, KwaZulu-Natal, Laos, Liberia, Madagascar, Malawi, Malaya, Mozambique, Myanmar, New Guinea, Nigeria, Philippines, Queensland, Rwanda, Sierra Leone, Solomon Island, Sri Lanka, Sulawesi, Sumatra, Tanzania, Thailand, Uganda, Vietnam, Zambia, and Zimbabwe.

Its genus name of Donella, is in honour of George Don (1798–1856), a Scottish botanist and plant collector; it was published in Hist. Pl. Vol.11 o page 294 in 1891.

== Species ==
Known species:

- Donella ambrensis Aubrév. – northern Madagascar
- Donella analalavensis Aubrév. – northwestern and northern Madagascar
- Donella bangweolensis (R.E.Fr. & Pellegr.) Mackinder – Angola, Democratic Republic of the Congo, Zambia, and Tanzania
- Donella capuronii (G.E.Schatz & L.Gaut.) Mackinder & L.Gaut. – northeastern Madagascar
- Donella delphinensis Aubrév. – eastern Madagascar
- Donella fenerivensis Aubrév. – northeastern Madagascar
- Donella guereliana (Aubrév.) Mackinder – western and northern Madagascar
- Donella humbertii Capuron ex Mackinder & L.Gaut. – western and north-central Madagascar
- Donella lanceolata (Blume) Aubrév. – northern and eastern Madagascar
- Donella masoalensis Aubrév. – northeastern Madagascar
- Donella ogoouensis (A.Chev.) Aubrév. & Pellegr. – Gabon
- Donella perrieri Lecomte – Madagascar
- Donella pruniformis (Engl.) Pierre ex Engl. – western and central Africa to Uganda
- Donella ranirisonii L.Gaut. & Mackinder – northeastern Madagascar
- Donella ubangiensis (De Wild.) Aubrév. – western and central Africa to Uganda
- Donella viridifolia (J.M.Wood & Franks) Aubrév. & Pellegr. – KwaZulu-Natal, Eswatini, Mozambique, Malawi, and Kenya
- Donella welwitschii (Engl.) Pierre ex Engl. – western and central Africa to Angola and Zambia
