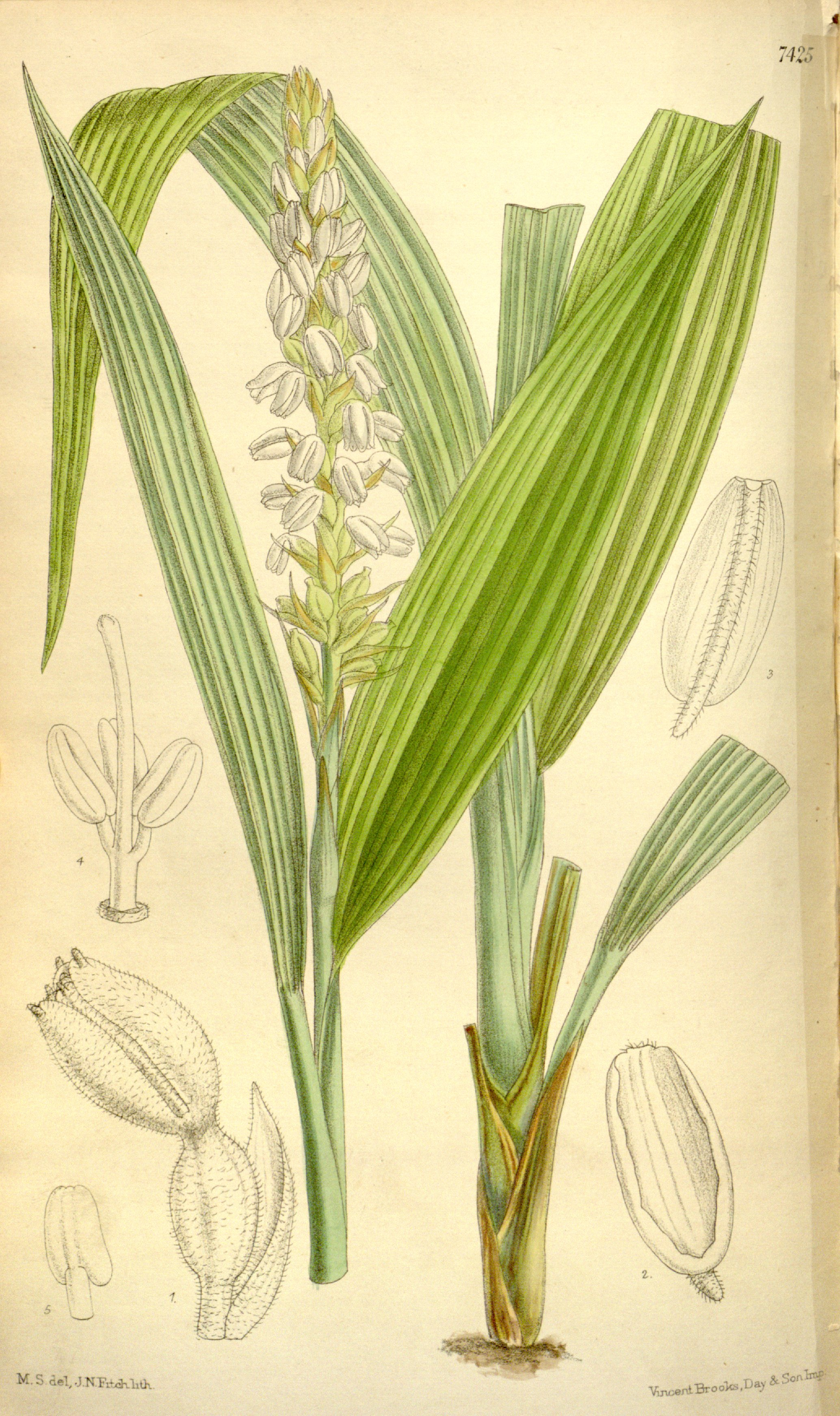
- Neuwiedia griffithii 1874 illustration from Curtis's Botanical Magazine

Scientific classification
- Kingdom: Plantae
- Clade: Tracheophytes
- Clade: Angiosperms
- Clade: Monocots
- Order: Asparagales
- Family: Orchidaceae
- Subfamily: Apostasioideae
- Genus: Neuwiedia; Blume, 1833

Type species
- Neuwiedia veratrifolia Blume

= Neuwiedia =

Genus of orchids

Neuwiedia is a genus of primitive terrestrial orchids (family Orchidaceae), comprising 9 species native to China, Southeast Asia and certain Pacific Islands.

The two genera in the subfamily Apostasioideae, Apostasia and Neuwiedia, differ from most other orchids in having three stamens. Recent studies suggest that the fifteen or so species in these two genera, although exhibiting "primitive" features, are "sister" genera rather than ancestors of other orchid families. Like the genus Apostasia of the same subfamily, this genus is noted for having 3 fertile stamens instead of only two as in the case of other orchids. Because of this primitive characteristic, the genus was considered by some as not being true orchids.

The genus was named by Carl Ludwig von Blume in honor of Prince Maximilian of Wied-Neuwied (1782-1859).

The genus is distributed in shaded habitats. They are tall herbs with rhizomes and grow long, plicate leaves. They produce an unbranched, erect, terminal inflorescence bearing usually white or yellow, nodding flowers.

== Species ==
The following species are recognized as of June 2014:

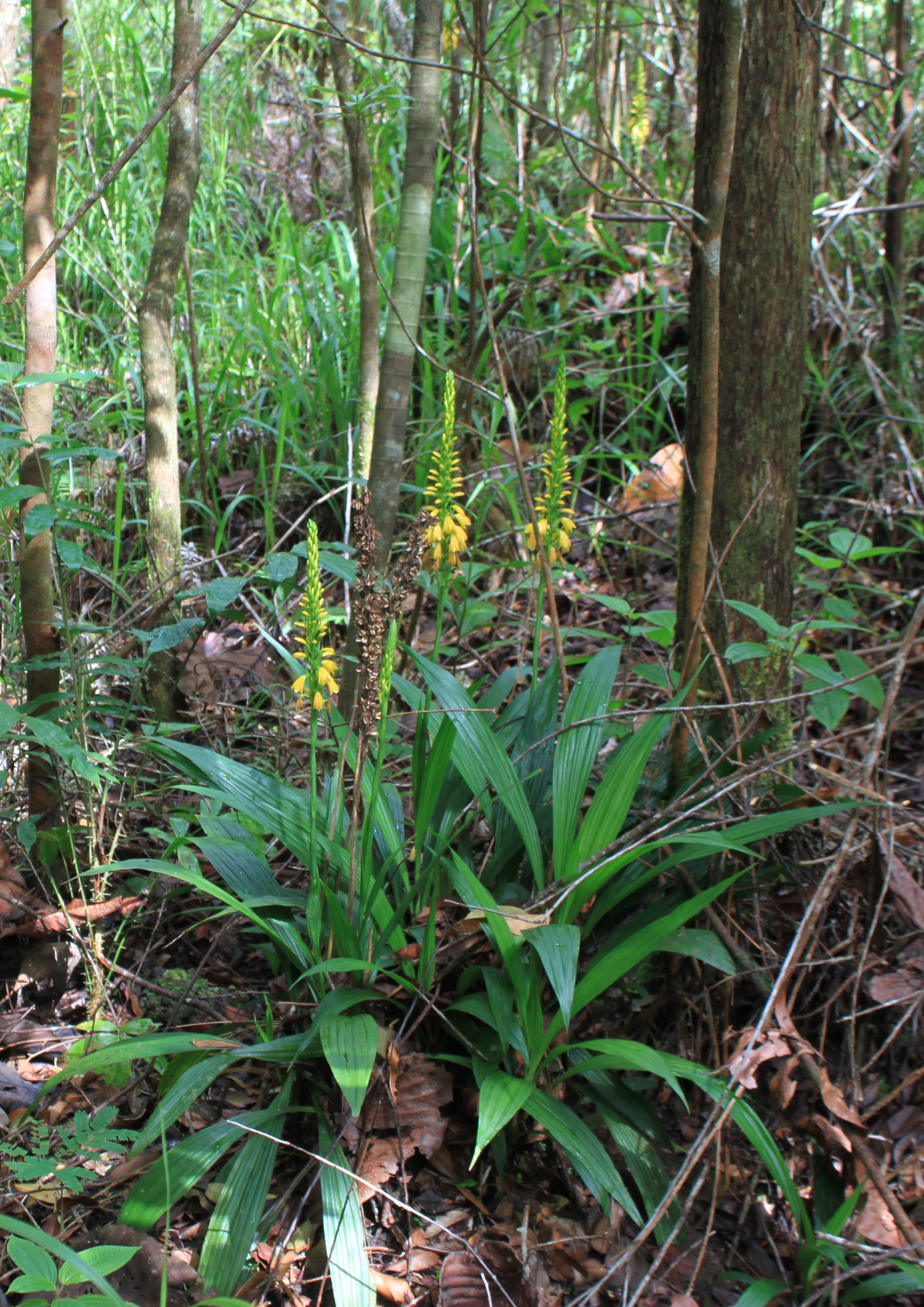
Neuwiedia veratrifolia

- Neuwiedia borneensis de Vogel 1969 - Borneo
- Neuwiedia elongata de Vogel 1969 - Borneo
- Neuwiedia griffithii Rchb.f. 1874 - Vietnam, Malaya, Sumatra
- Neuwiedia inae de Vogel 1969 - Borneo, Vietnam
- Neuwiedia malipoensis Z.J.Liu, L.J.Chen & K.Wei Liu 2012 - Yunnan
- Neuwiedia siamensis de Vogel 1969 -Thailand
- Neuwiedia veratrifolia Blume 1834 - Indonesia, Malaysia, Philippines, New Guinea, Vanuatu, Solomon Islands
- Neuwiedia zollingeri Rchb.f. 1857 - Hainan, Hong Kong, Yunnan, Borneo, Sumatra, Java, Bali, Malaysia, Singapore, Thailand, Vietnam
  - Neuwiedia zollingeri var. annamensis (Gagnep.) Aver - Vietnam
  - Neuwiedia zollingeri var. javanica (J.J.Sm.) de Vogel - Vietnam, Borneo, Sumatra, Java, Bali
  - Neuwiedia zollingeri var. singapureana (Wall. ex Baker) de Vogel - Hainan, Hong Kong, Yunnan, Thailand, Vietnam, Borneo, Sumatra, Malaysia
  - Neuwiedia zollingeri var. zollingeri - Sumatra, Java
