= Pycnandra petiolata =

Conservation status
- Least Concern (IUCN 3.1)

Scientific classification
- Kingdom: Plantae
- Clade: Tracheophytes
- Clade: Angiosperms
- Clade: Eudicots
- Clade: Asterids
- Order: Ericales
- Family: Sapotaceae
- Genus: Pycnandra
- Species: P. petiolata

Binomial name
- Pycnandra petiolata (Vink) Munzinger & Swenson

Synonyms
- Leptostylis petiolata Vink

Species of plant

Pycnandra petiolata is a species of plant in the family Sapotaceae. It is endemic to New Caledonia.
