= Big Banana =

Tourist attraction in Coffs Harbour, Australia

The Big Banana

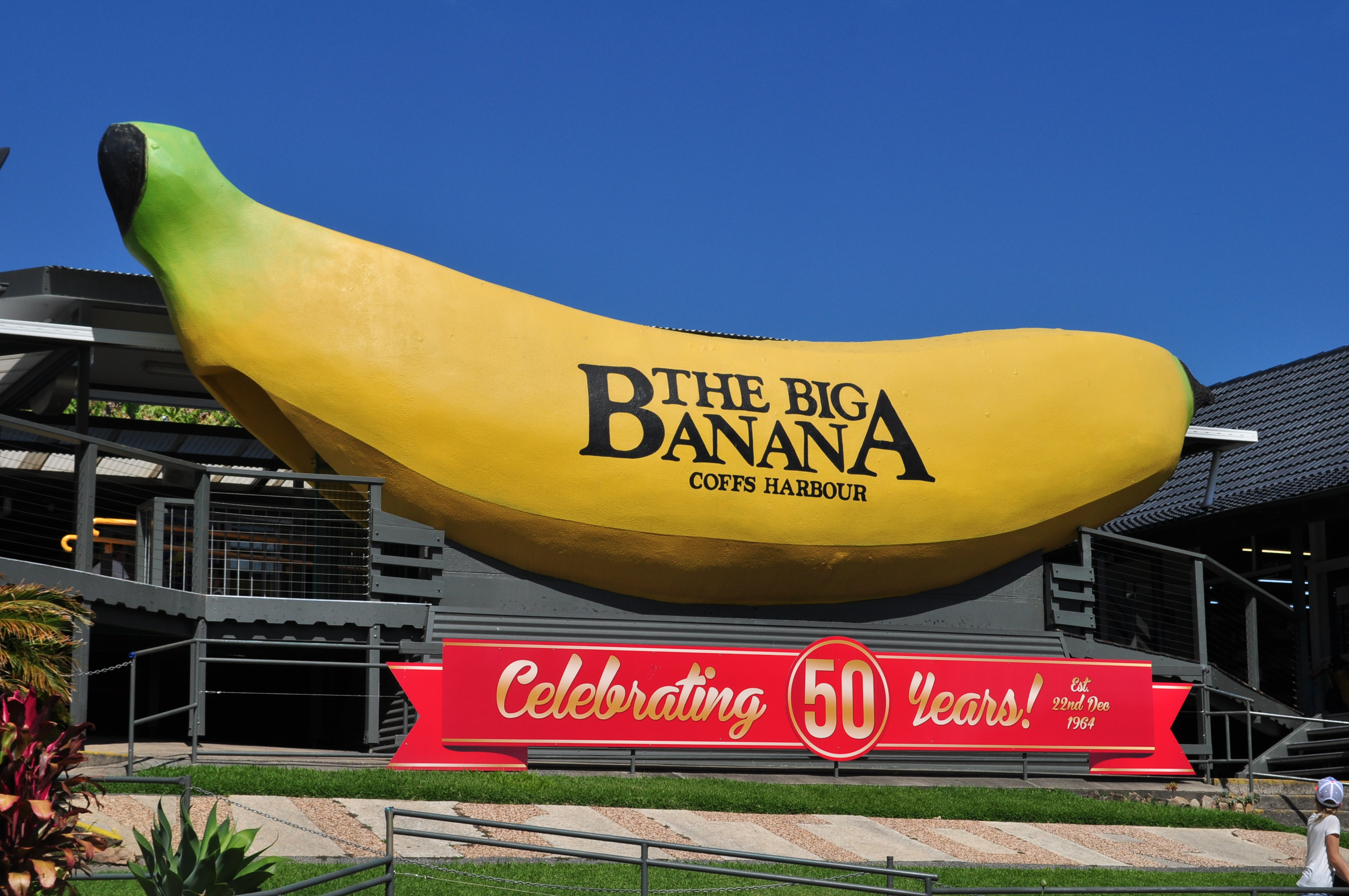
- Interactive map of The Big Banana
- Location: Coffs Harbour, New South Wales, Australia
- Coordinates: 30°16′29.15″S 153°08′01.67″E
- Opened: 22 December 1964
- Slogan: "It's a whole bunch of fun!"
- Operating season: Year-round
- Area: 45 acres (18 ha)

Attractions
- Total: 13
- Roller coasters: 1
- Water rides: 8
- Website: www.bigbanana.com

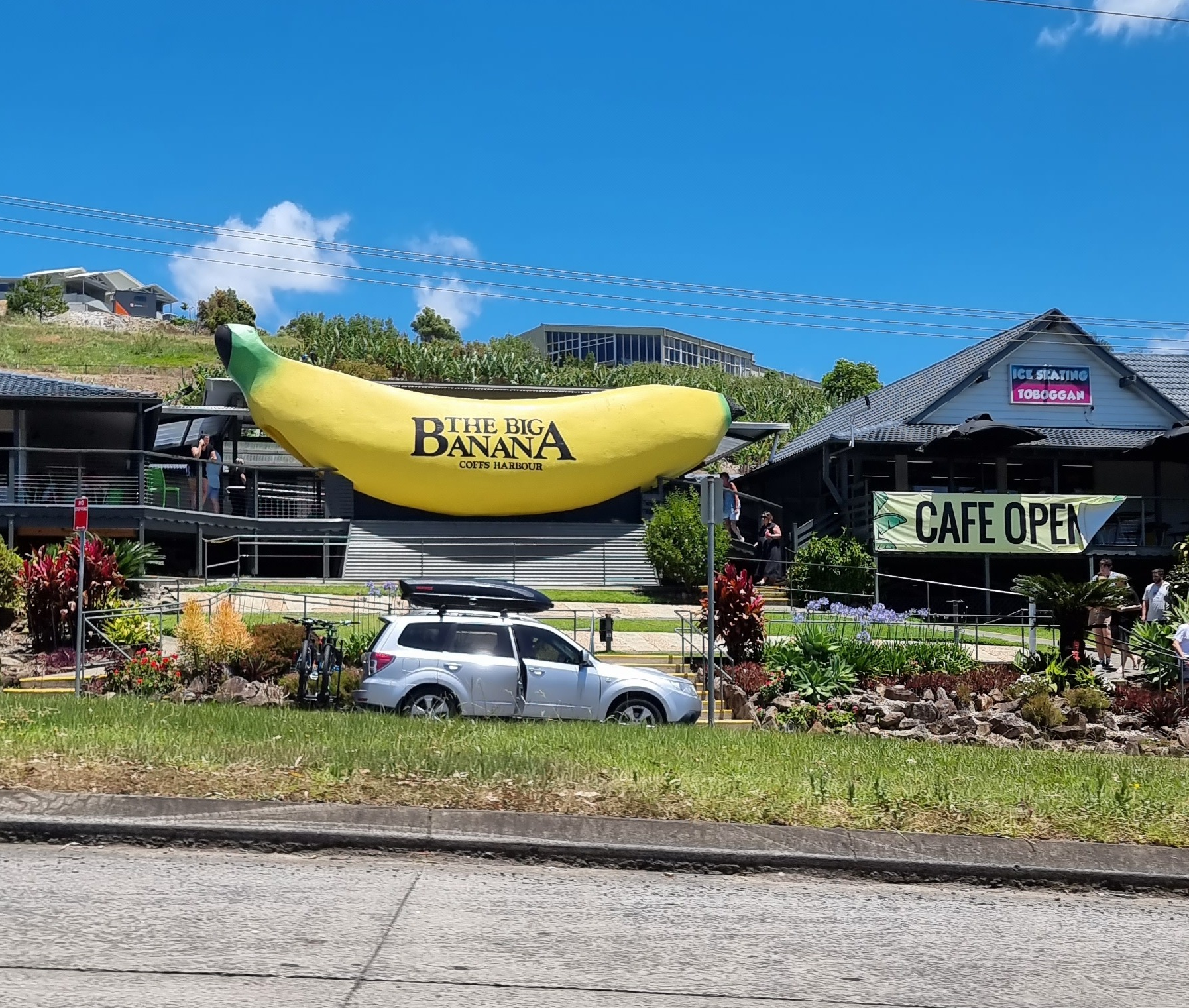
The Big Banana, located in Coffs Harbour

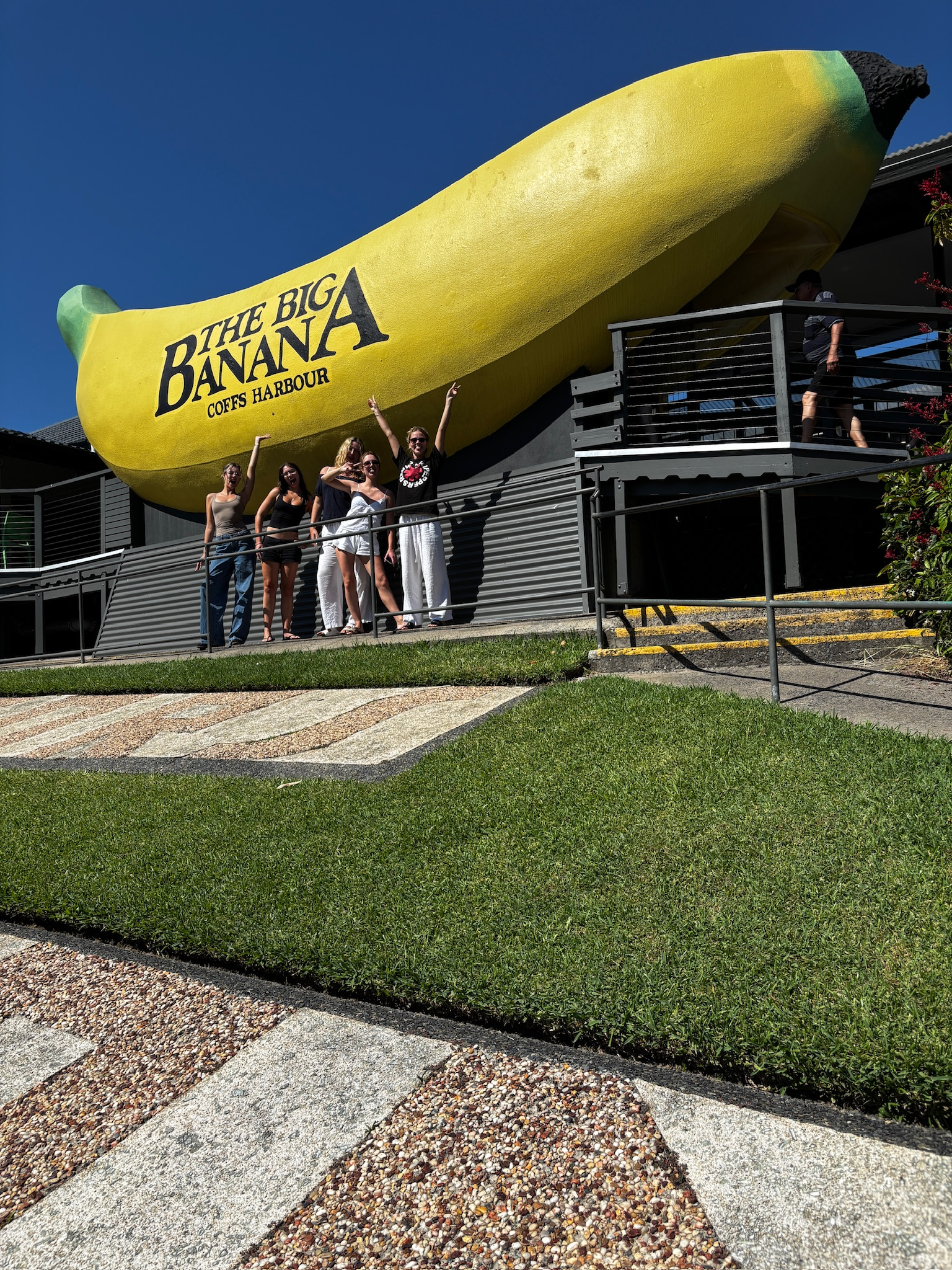
Popular Photo Op

The Big Banana is a tourist attraction and amusement park in the city of Coffs Harbour, New South Wales, Australia. The grounds of the park are set amongst a banana plantation, featuring a large walk-through banana. Built in 1964, it was one of Australia's first Big Things. Other notable attractions include an alpine coaster, toboggan ride, giant slide, and water park. Plantation tours are also available. In keeping with the plantation theme, banana-related products are shown or sold in the park which also has a souvenir shop and restaurant. In January 2014, during the peak tourist season the Big Banana received close to 150,000 visitors. The Big Banana has been a family owned business since it was opened by Betty and John Landi, and Stella and John Enveoldson in 1964.

The original Big Banana has been copied by the Big Bunch of Bananas, also in Coffs Harbour, and the Big Bananas at Carnarvon, Western Australia.

In 2011, Huffington Post included the Big Banana in their list of the "Top 10 Pieces of Folly Architecture."

A species of plant described in 2023, Pittosporum kororoense, was given the common name "Big Banana Pittosporum" due to its very limited range in rainforest within close proximity to the attraction.

== Attractions ==
=== Current ===
The park's rides include an 82m slide, dodgems, a 4D Cinema, a toboggan and water slides. Other attractions include laser tag, mini golf, an ice skating rink, a theatre providing an educational experience, a reptile zoo, and escape rooms.

In 2022, plans were submitted for the park to construct an alpine coaster, known as Plantation Coaster. The ride, expected to cost $5.5m, was approved in 2023, and construction began in April 2025. Plantation Coaster opened on 13 December 2025.

=== Former ===
The park featured three scenic monorail sets driven on a two beam track. The track passed by a lagoon that featured an animatronic bunyip, which was shut off in 2005 due to budget constraints. The monorail's track linked display buildings and transported visitors up the steep slope of the plantation. In 2005, a broken down train was being pushed by one of the two other sets to a maintenance shed for repairs when the coupling system failed and the broken down set ploughed into the lagoon.

On the evening of Australia Day 2014, a disused scenic lookout attraction was destroyed by fire.

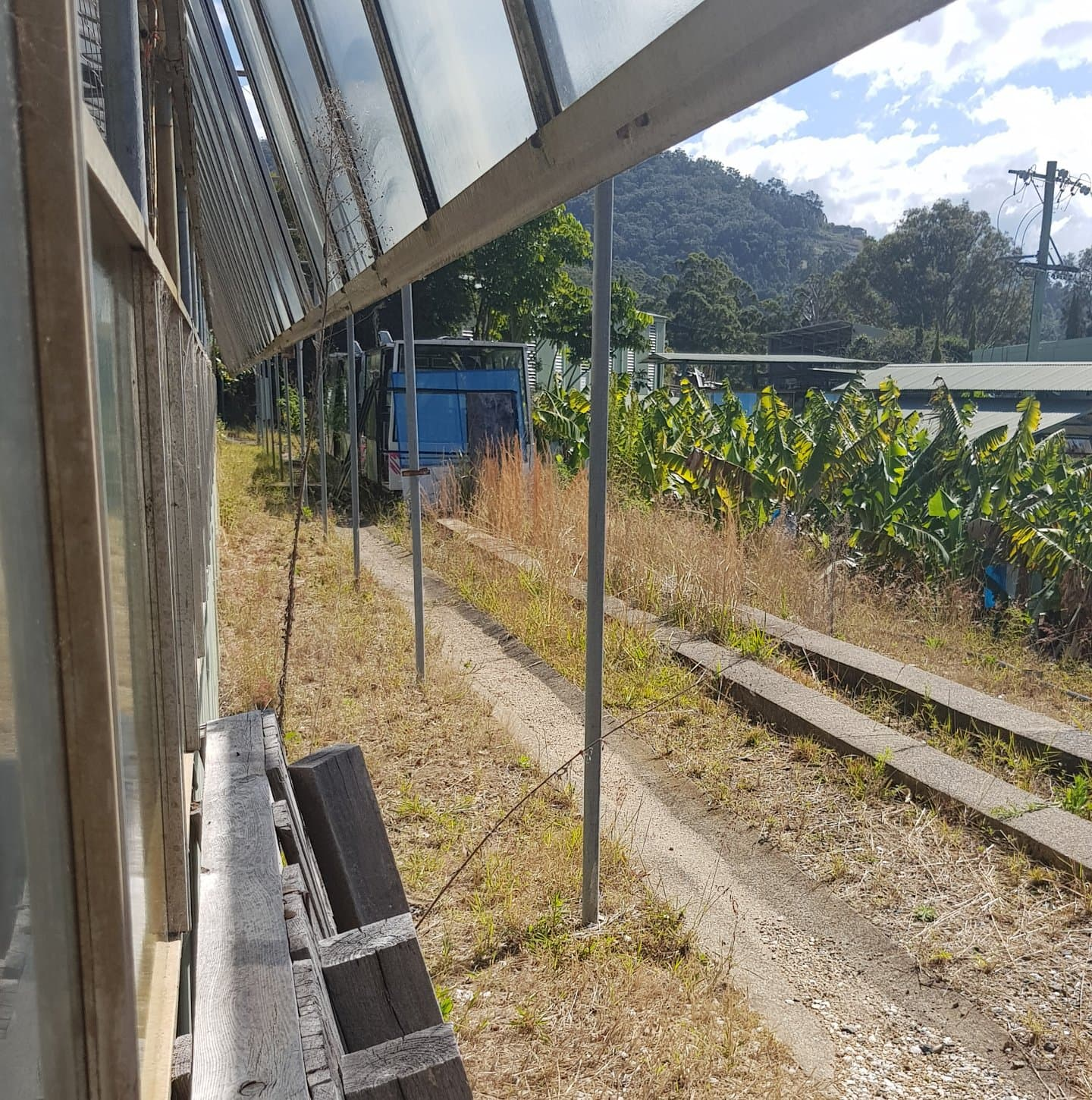
Carriages belonging to one of the two remaining train sets now out of service, next to an unused green house.

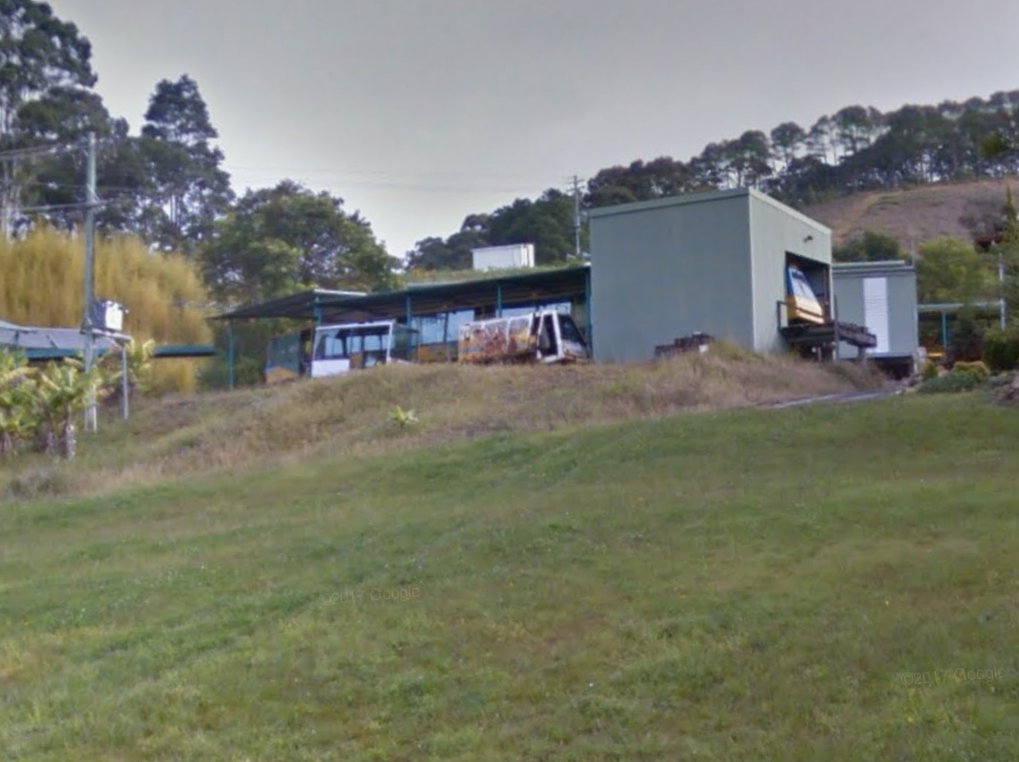
One of the two remaining train sets now out of service with a driver car and carriage belonging to the other set in the foreground.

== Postage stamps ==
Australia Post issued a set of 50c postage stamps in 2007 commemorating big things, including the Big Banana. The other big thing stamps were:

- (Big) Golden Guitar at Tamworth, New South Wales
- Big Lobster at Kingston SE, South Australia
- Big Merino (sheep) at Goulburn, New South Wales
- Big Pineapple at Nambour, Queensland

== See also ==
- Australia's big things
- List of world's largest roadside attractions
