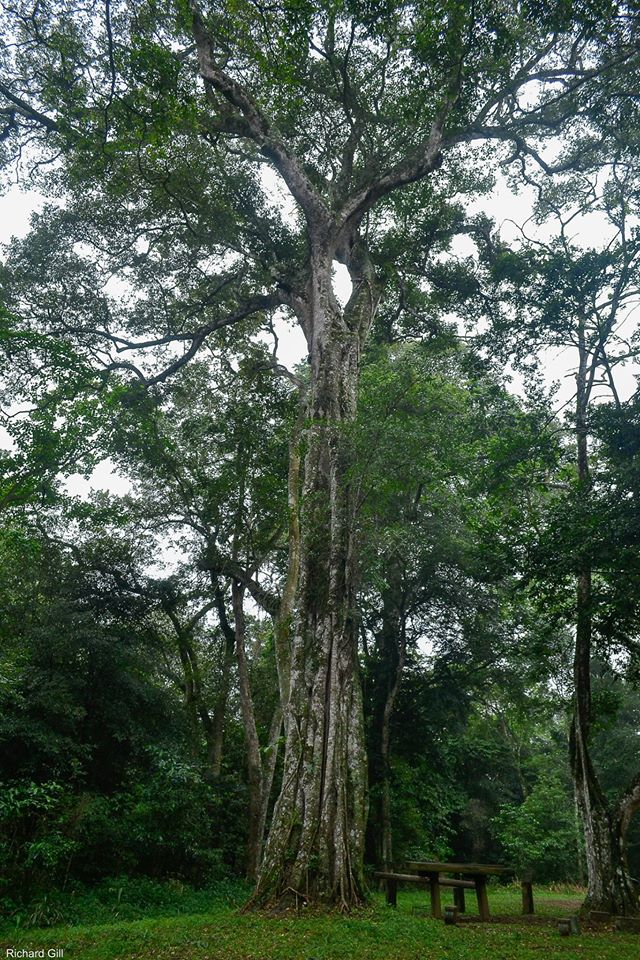
- mature habit, South Africa

Conservation status
- Least Concern (IUCN 3.1)

Scientific classification
- Kingdom: Plantae
- Clade: Tracheophytes
- Clade: Angiosperms
- Clade: Eudicots
- Clade: Asterids
- Order: Ericales
- Family: Sapotaceae
- Genus: Donella
- Species: D. viridifolia

Binomial name
- Donella viridifolia (J.M.Wood & Franks) Aubrév. & Pellegr. (1961)

Synonyms
- Chrysophyllum viridifolium J.M.Wood & Franks (1911)

= Donella viridifolia =

Fluted milkwood

Species of tree

Donella viridifolia, commonly known as fluted milkwood, is a potentially large (up to 20 m tall) species of evergreen milkwood tree that occurs in East African coastal forests, southerly coastal forest mosaics and in some inland forests of the tropics and subtropics.

== Range and habitat ==
It is native to Kenya, Mozambique, Malawi, eastern Zimbabwe, Eswatini and South Africa (KZN and Eastern Cape provinces). Its habitat is coastal forest northwards of East London, and montane forests of the Chimanimani range and Malawi.

== Description ==
The trunk may be fluted at the base, and the greyish bark is fairly smooth and mottled. Young branches and the undersides of leaves are covered in reddish indumentum. The blunt-tipped, oblong leaves measure some 4-9 by 1.5-5 cm. The indented midrib is connected to a sub-marginal vein by numerous, closely spaced parallel veins. The wavy margin is entire. The white flowers are borne in axillary clusters. The edible fruit are almost round and slightly ribbed, and ripen to a yellow colour.

== Gallery ==
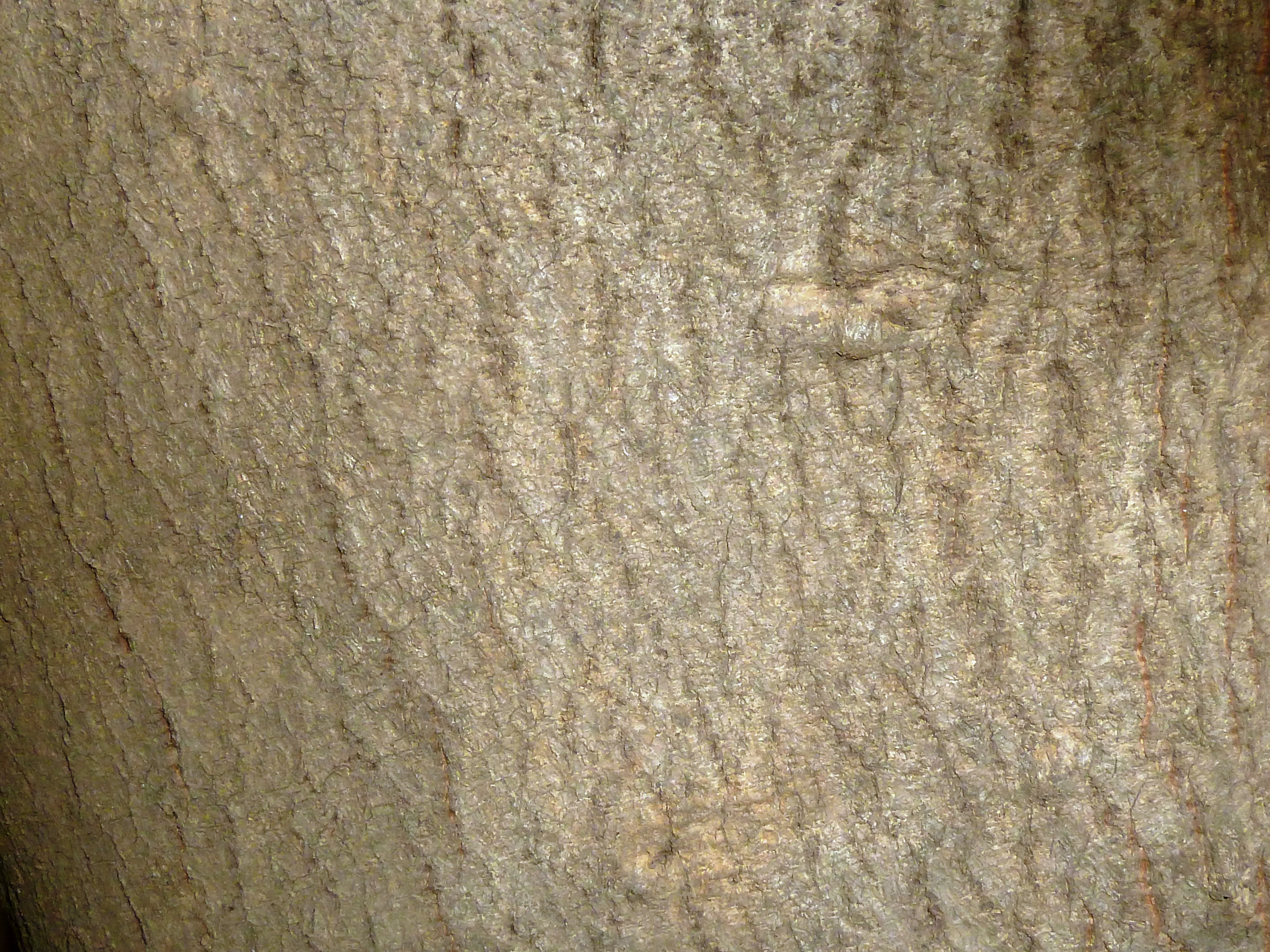
bark texture

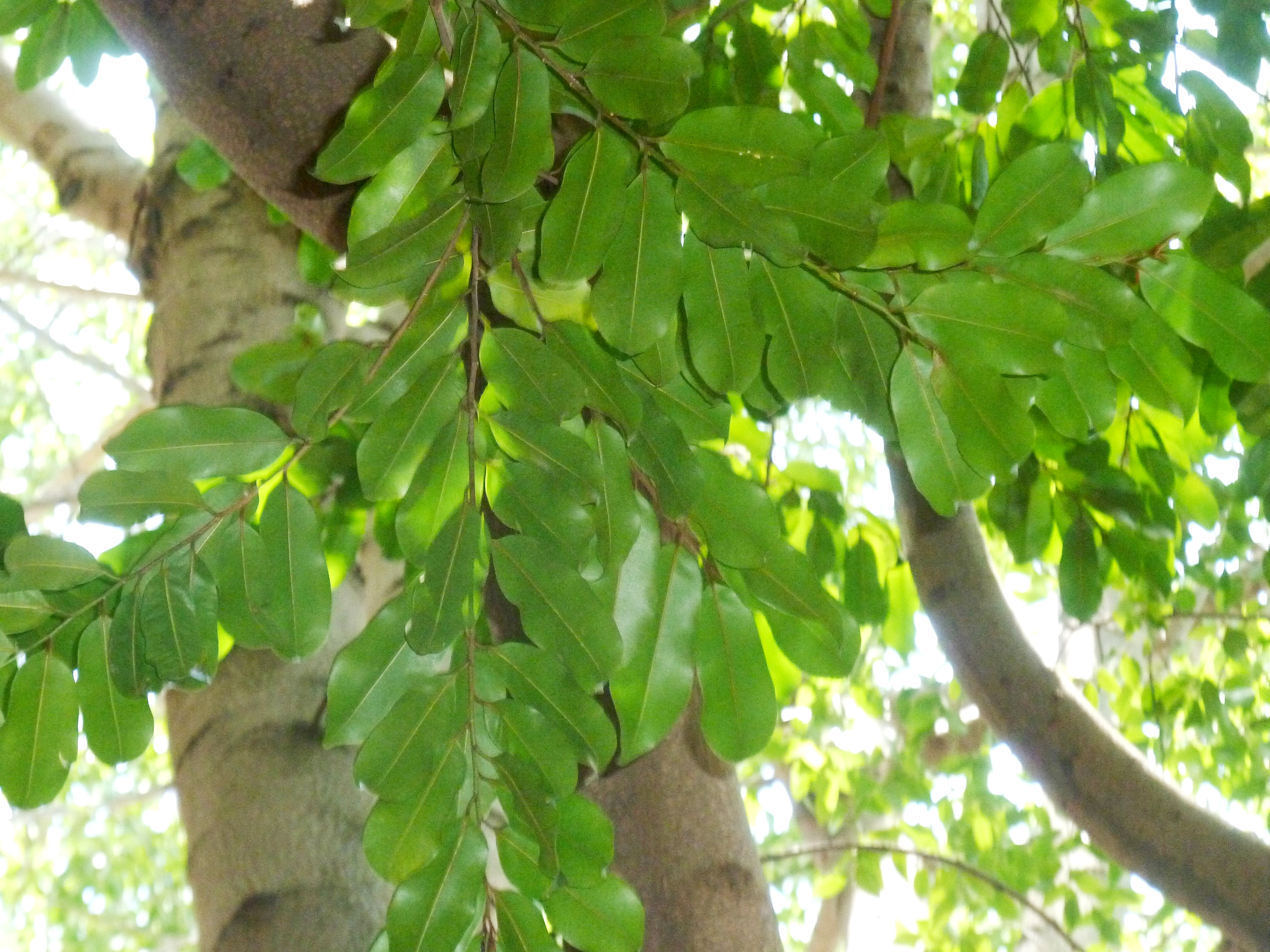
foliage on spray

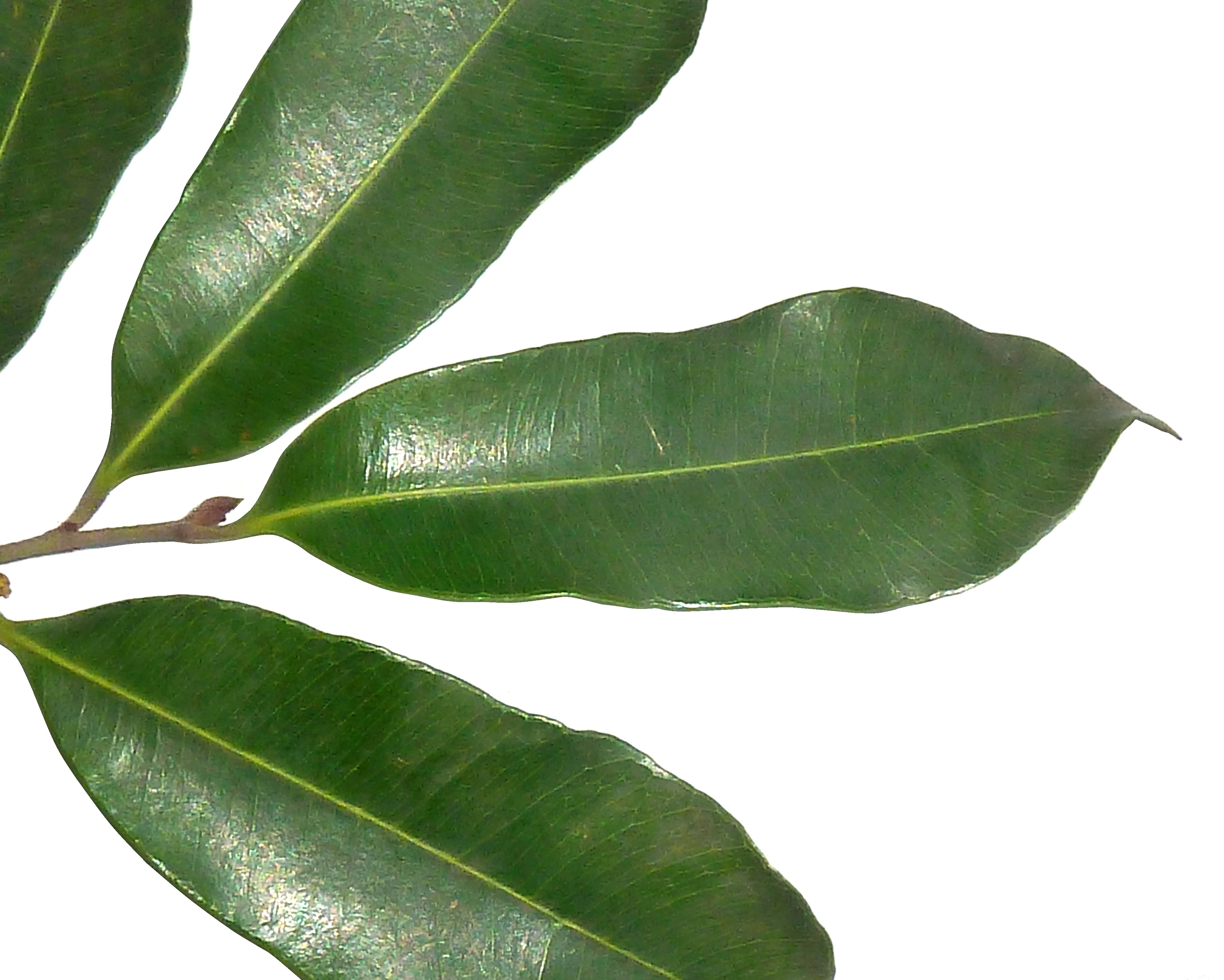
leaves

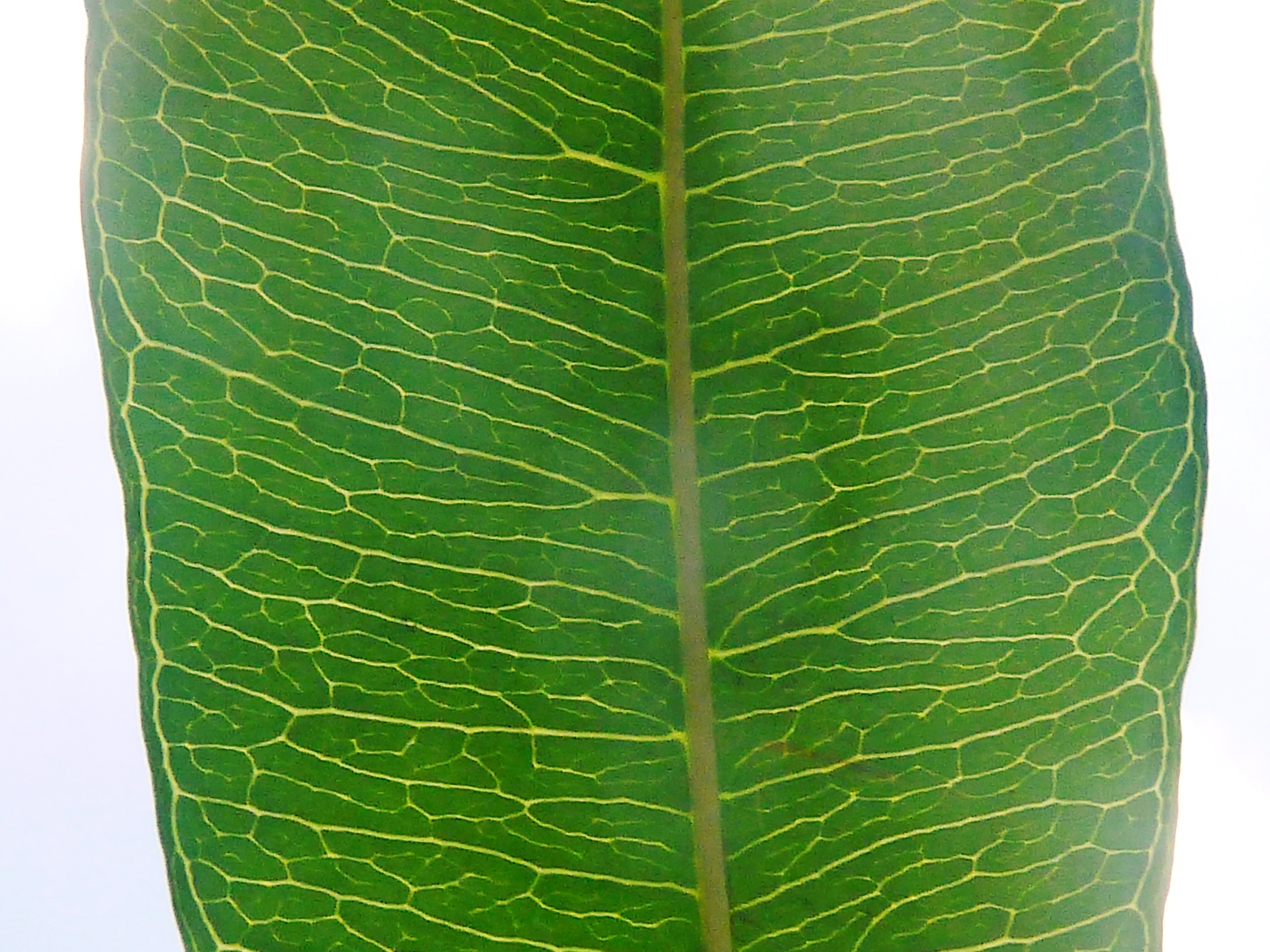
leaf venation

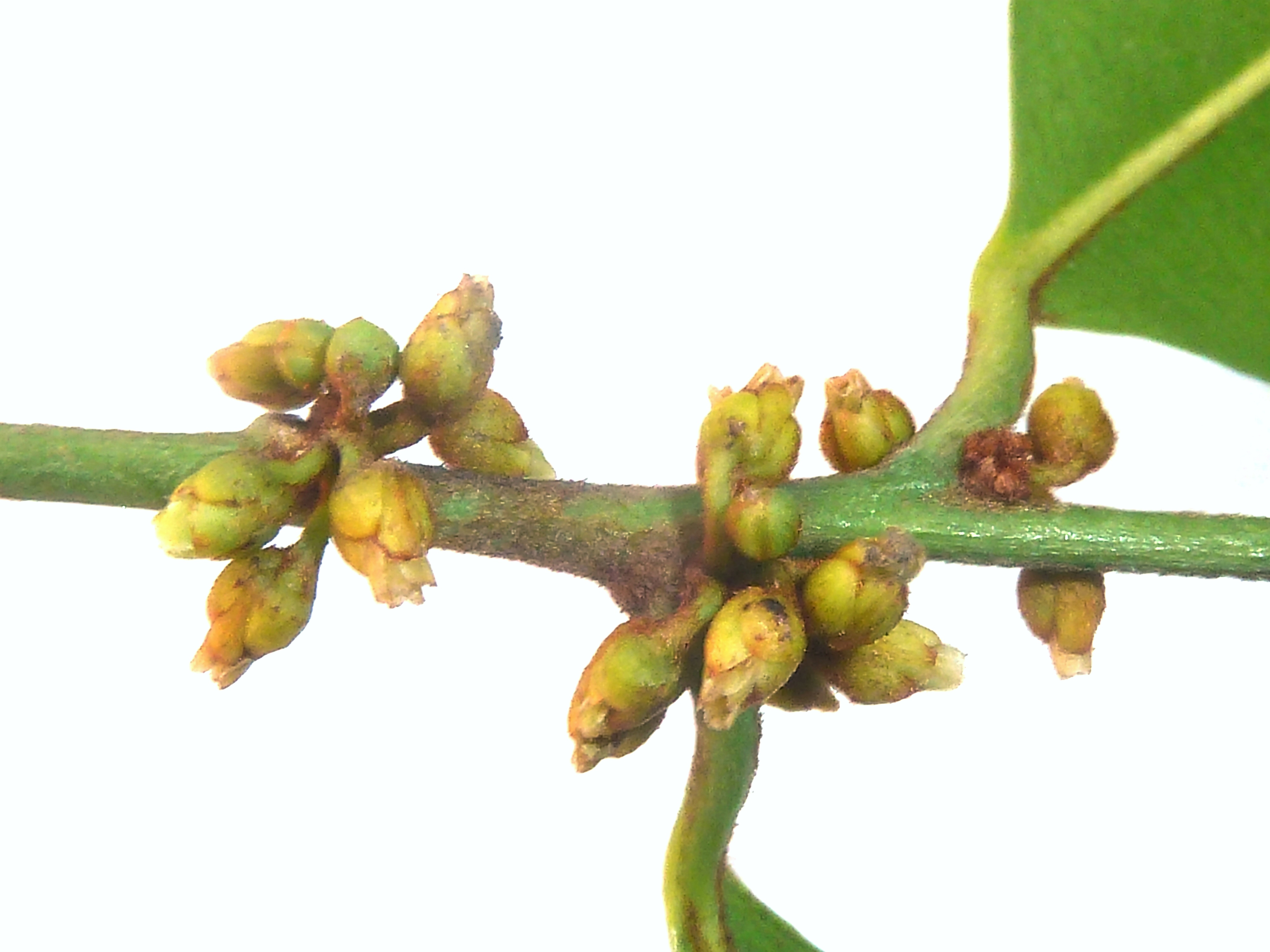
flowers
