= Pycnandra filipes =

Scientific classification
- Kingdom: Plantae
- Clade: Tracheophytes
- Clade: Angiosperms
- Clade: Eudicots
- Clade: Asterids
- Order: Ericales
- Family: Sapotaceae
- Genus: Pycnandra
- Species: P. filipes

Binomial name
- Pycnandra filipes (Benth.) Munzinger & Swensons

Synonyms
- Leptostylis gatopensis; Leptostylis multiflora

Species of plant

Pycnandra fillipes is a species of plant in the family Sapotaceae. It is endemic to New Caledonia and has two subspecies: subsp. fillipes and subsp. multiflora.
