= Pycnandra kaalaensis =

Conservation status
- Near Threatened (IUCN 3.1)

Scientific classification
- Kingdom: Plantae
- Clade: Tracheophytes
- Clade: Angiosperms
- Clade: Eudicots
- Clade: Asterids
- Order: Ericales
- Family: Sapotaceae
- Genus: Pycnandra
- Species: P. kaalaensis

Binomial name
- Pycnandra kaalaensis Aubrév.

Species of plant

Pycnandra kaalaensis is a species of plant in the family Sapotaceae. It is endemic to New Caledonia.
