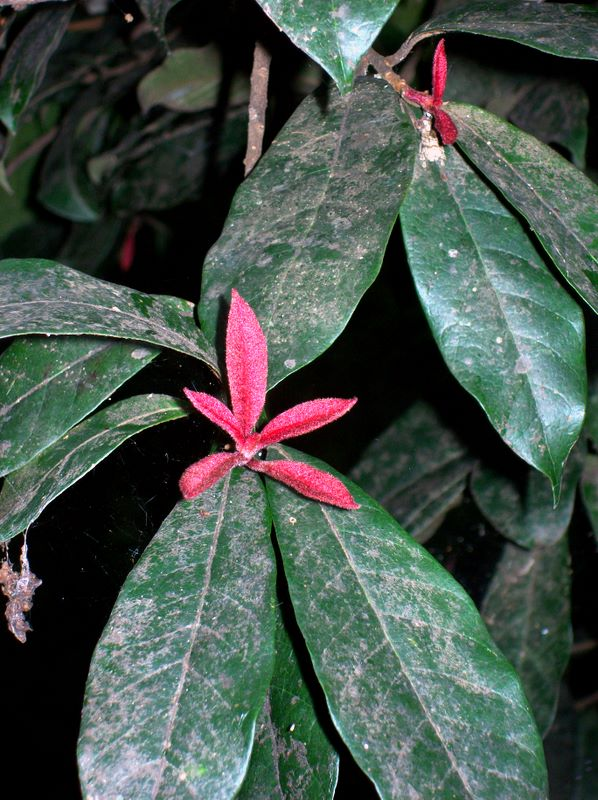
- new red leaves of the rusty plum

Conservation status
- Vulnerable (EPBC Act)

Scientific classification
- Kingdom: Plantae
- Clade: Tracheophytes
- Clade: Angiosperms
- Clade: Eudicots
- Clade: Asterids
- Order: Ericales
- Family: Sapotaceae
- Genus: Niemeyera
- Species: N. whitei

Binomial name
- Niemeyera whitei (Aubrev.) Jessup

Synonyms
- Chrysophyllum pruniferum F.Muell.; Niemeyera pruniferum (F.Muell.) F.Muell.; Amorphospermum whitei Aubrev.

= Niemeyera whitei =

Rusty plum

Species of tree

Niemeyera whitei known as the rusty plum or plum boxwood is a species of tree native to eastern Australia.

== Description ==
Niemeyera whitei is a small or medium-sized tree with rusty coloured hairs on the ventral surface of the leaves. It grows up to 20 metres (66 ft) tall and has a stem diameter of 5–50 cm (2.0–19.7 in). The trunk is irregular and fluted with creamy grey bark with a corky quality with bumps and pits. Branches are thick and covered in rusty hairs and produce a white milky sap when broken.

Leaves are 5–15 cm (2.0–5.9 in) long, 2–5 cm (0.79–1.97 in) wide, alternate on the stem and with entire margins. The upper surface of the leaf is smooth and green and paler below with rusty hairs and prominent veins. The 12–15 lateral veins are angled about 45–60° from the midrib.

Flowers are green with parts of rusty brown and form in clusters. Flowering occurs form in clusters from September to October. The fruit is a berry, 2–7 cm (0.79–2.76 in) in diameter, initially red, then turning purple and black. Inside is a large spherical seed (rarely 2 seeds), 2–3 cm (0.79–1.18 in) in diameter with pink edible flesh. On one side of the seed is a glossy eye-shaped scar, 1–2 cm (0.39–0.79 in) long. The seed is mostly covered with light brownish down except the scar which is glossy mid brown. Fruit matures from September to November. Regeneration takes up to 6 months.

== Distribution and habitat ==
Niemeyera whitei occurs on nutrient-poor soils in areas below 600 metres above sea level in gullies, warm temperate or littoral rainforest from the Macleay River, New South Wales to Tallebudgera Creek in south eastern Queensland.
