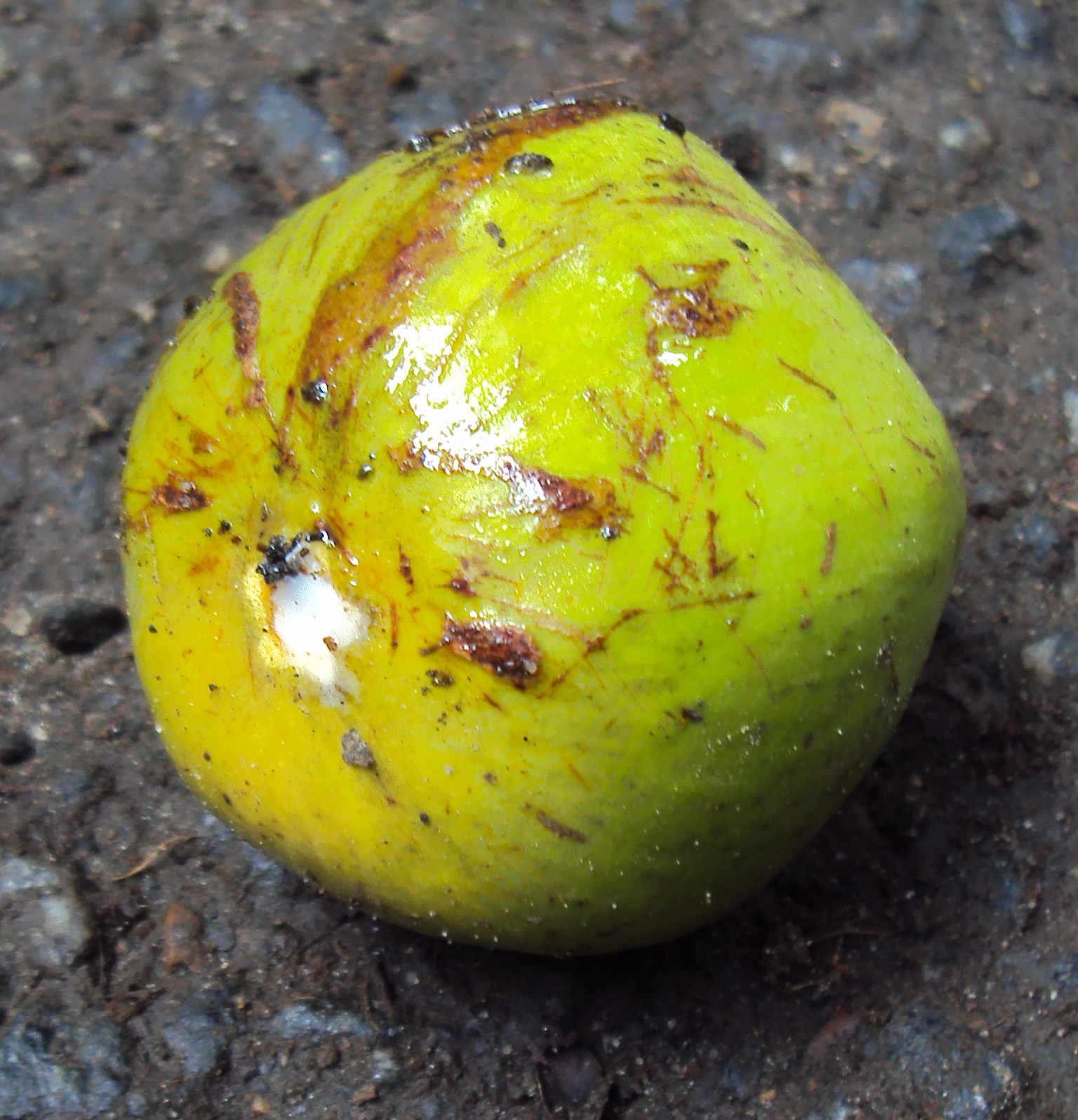
- Fruit

Conservation status
- Least Concern (IUCN 3.1)
- Near Threatened (NCA)

Scientific classification
- Kingdom: Plantae
- Clade: Embryophytes
- Clade: Tracheophytes
- Clade: Spermatophytes
- Clade: Angiosperms
- Clade: Eudicots
- Clade: Asterids
- Order: Ericales
- Family: Sapotaceae
- Genus: Donella
- Species: D. lanceolata

Binomial name
- Donella lanceolata (Blume) Aubrév.

Synonyms
- 19 synonyms: Chrysophyllum javanicum Steud.; Chrysophyllum lanceolatum (Blume) A.DC.; Lucuma lanceolata (Blume) Zipp.; Nycterisition lanceolatum Blume; Chrysophyllum acuminatum Roxb.; Chrysophyllum bancanum Miq.; Chrysophyllum dioicum Koord. & Valeton; Chrysophyllum lanceolatum var. papuanum C.T.White; Chrysophyllum lanceolatum var. stellatocarpon P.Royen; Chrysophyllum pentagonum Hance; Chrysophyllum roxburghianum Speede; Chrysophyllum roxburghii G.Don; Chrysophyllum roxburghii var. papuanum C.T.White; Chrysophyllum sumatranum Miq.; Donella lanceolata var. malagassica Aubrév.; Donella roxburghii (G.Don) Pierre ex Lecomte; Donella roxburghii var. tonkinensis Lecomte; Lucuma tomentosa Zipp.; Niemeyera papuana H.J.Lam

= Donella lanceolata =

Species of flowering plant

Donella lanceolata is a plant species in the family Sapotaceae. It is a tree growing up to 30 metres (100 ft) tall, with a trunk diameter of up to 40 cm (16 in). The bark is grey to dark brown. Inflorescences bear up to 45 flowers. The fruit are brownish to purplish black, ripening yellow, round, up to 4 cm (2 in) in diameter. Its habitat is lowland forests from sea level to 700 metres (2,300 ft) altitude. Its natural range is Madagascar, India, Sri Lanka, Thailand, Cambodia, Laos, Vietnam, Malaysia, Brunei, Indonesia, the Philippines, Papua New Guinea, the Solomon Islands and Queensland, Australia.

== Conservation ==
This species is listed by the International Union for Conservation of Nature (IUCN)) as least concern, citing its wide distribution across a number of countries, its large population and its occurrence in protected areas as the basis for the assessment.

In Australia, the Queensland Department of Environment and Science (DES) has assessed it as near threatened. Although there is no explanation provided by DES, the species only occurs in a few scattered locations in Queensland, which may account for the status.
