= Pycnandra blanchonii =

Conservation status
- Near Threatened (IUCN 3.1)

Scientific classification
- Kingdom: Plantae
- Clade: Tracheophytes
- Clade: Angiosperms
- Clade: Eudicots
- Clade: Asterids
- Order: Ericales
- Family: Sapotaceae
- Genus: Pycnandra
- Species: P. blanchonii

Binomial name
- Pycnandra blanchonii (Aubrév.) Swenson & Munzinger

Synonyms
- Chrysophyllum gatopense Guillaumin; Niemeyera gatopensis (Guillaumin) T.D.Penn.; Ochrothallus blanchonii Aubrév.; Sebertia gatopensis (Guillaumin) Aubrév.

Species of flowering plant

Pycnandra blanchonii is a species of plant in the family Sapotaceae. It is endemic to New Caledonia.
