= Pycnandra francii =

Conservation status
- Least Concern (IUCN 3.1)

Scientific classification
- Kingdom: Plantae
- Clade: Tracheophytes
- Clade: Angiosperms
- Clade: Eudicots
- Clade: Asterids
- Order: Ericales
- Family: Sapotaceae
- Genus: Pycnandra
- Species: P. francii

Binomial name
- Pycnandra francii (Guillaumin & Dubard) Swenson & Munzinger

Synonyms
- Chrysophyllum francii Guillaumin & Dubard; Niemeyera francii (Guillaumin & Dubard) T.D.Penn.; Ochrothallus francii (Guillaumin & Dubard) Guillaumin

Species of plant

Pycnandra francii is a species of plant in the family Sapotaceae. It is endemic to New Caledonia.
