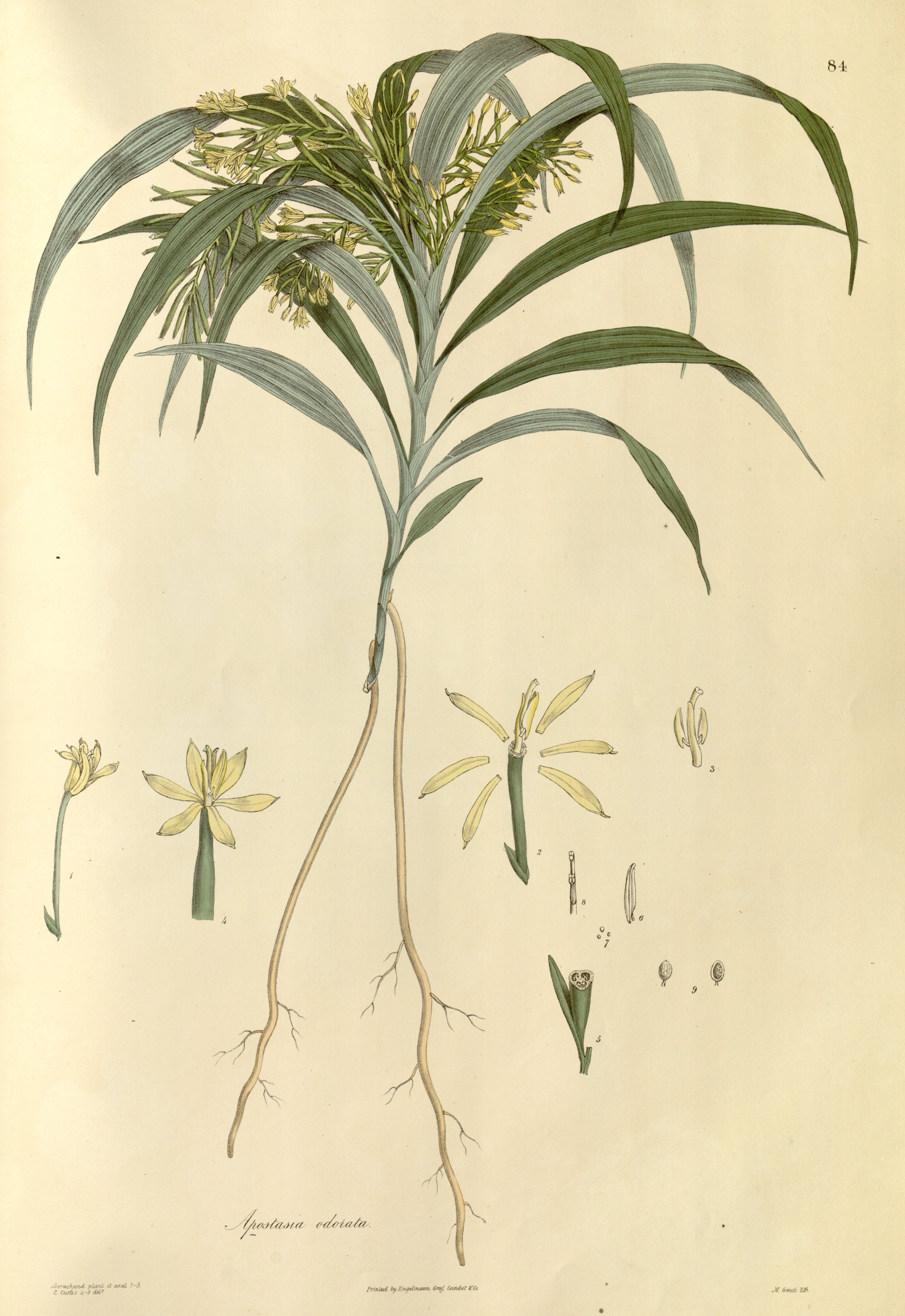
- Apostasia wallichii

Scientific classification
- Kingdom: Plantae
- Clade: Tracheophytes
- Clade: Angiosperms
- Clade: Monocots
- Order: Asparagales
- Family: Orchidaceae
- Subfamily: Apostasioideae
- Genus: Apostasia; Blume

Species
- See text

Synonyms
- Adactylus Rolfe; Mesodactylis Wall.; Neumayera Rchb.f; Niemeyera F.Muell.

= Apostasia (plant) =

Grass orchids

Genus of orchids

Apostasia, commonly known as grass orchids, is a genus of eight species of primitive orchids in the family Orchidaceae. They are terrestrial, evergreen, grass-like plants, barely recognisable as orchids and are distributed in humid areas of the Himalayan region, China, India, Sri Lanka, Southeast Asia, New Guinea, and Queensland. They have many narrow leaves and small yellow or white, non-resupinate, star-like flowers usually arranged on a branched flowering stem.

== Description ==
Plants in the genus Apostasia are evergreen, terrestrial, grass-like plants with a scaly rhizome with a few roots that sometimes develop tubers. They have thin stems with many long, narrow, grass-like leaves spirally arranged around them. Small yellow or white, non-resupinate flowers are arranged on a short, often branching flowering stem. The three sepals and three petals are all similar in size, shape and colour, unlike in more familiar orchids which usually have one petal modified as a labellum and often a dorsal sepal which differs from the lateral sepals. The parts of the column are also different from those in other orchids, with three instead of two stamens, which are separate from the style. Moreover, the pollen grains are not adhering to each other in pollinia.

== Taxonomy and naming ==
The genus Apostasia was first formally described in 1825 by Carl Ludwig Blume who published the description in Bijdragen tot de flora van Nederlandsch Indië. The genus name Apostasia is derived from the Ancient Greek word apostasis meaning "defection" or "departure from", referring to the distinct features of this genus.

The two genera in the subfamily Apostasioideae, Apostasia and Neuwiedia, differ from most other orchids in having three stamens. Recent studies suggest that the fifteen or so species in these two genera, although exhibiting "primitive" features, are "sister" genera rather than ancestors of other orchid families.

== Distribution and habitat ==
Species in the genus Apostasia are found from north-eastern India, Nepal and Bhutan to southern Japan, and through Southeast Asia to New Guinea and northern Australia. Three species, one of which is endemic, are found in China and one is endemic to Queensland.

=== List of species ===
The following is a list of species of Apostasia recognised by Plants of the World Online as at October 2025:

- Apostasia fogangica Y.Y.Yin, P.S.Zhong & Z.J.Liu
- Apostasia fujianica Yuan Y.Li & S.R.Lan
- Apostasia latifolia Rolfe
- Apostasia nipponica Masam.
- Apostasia nuda R.Br.
- Apostasia odorata Blume
- Apostasia parvula Schltr.
- Apostasia wallichii R.Br.
