= Pycnandra decandra =

Scientific classification
- Kingdom: Plantae
- Clade: Tracheophytes
- Clade: Angiosperms
- Clade: Eudicots
- Clade: Asterids
- Order: Ericales
- Family: Sapotaceae
- Subfamily: Chrysophylloideae
- Genus: Pycnandra
- Species: P. decandra

Binomial name
- Pycnandra decandra (Montrouz.) Vink

Synonyms
- Achradotypus decandrus (Montrouz.) Guillaumin; Chrysophyllum decandrum Montrouz.

Species of plant

Pycnandra decandra is a species of flowering plant in the family Sapotaceae, endemic to New Caledonia. It grows as a small shrub or tree. It was first described by Xavier Montrouzier in 1860 as Chrysophyllum decandrum.

== Subspecies ==
As of February 2024, Plants of the World Online accepted the following subspecies:

- Pycnandra decandra subsp. coriacea (Baill.) Swenson & Munzinger, synonyms including Pycnandra elegans (Vink) Baehni – central and southeastern New Caledonia
- Pycnandra decandra subsp. decandra – northwestern New Caledonia
