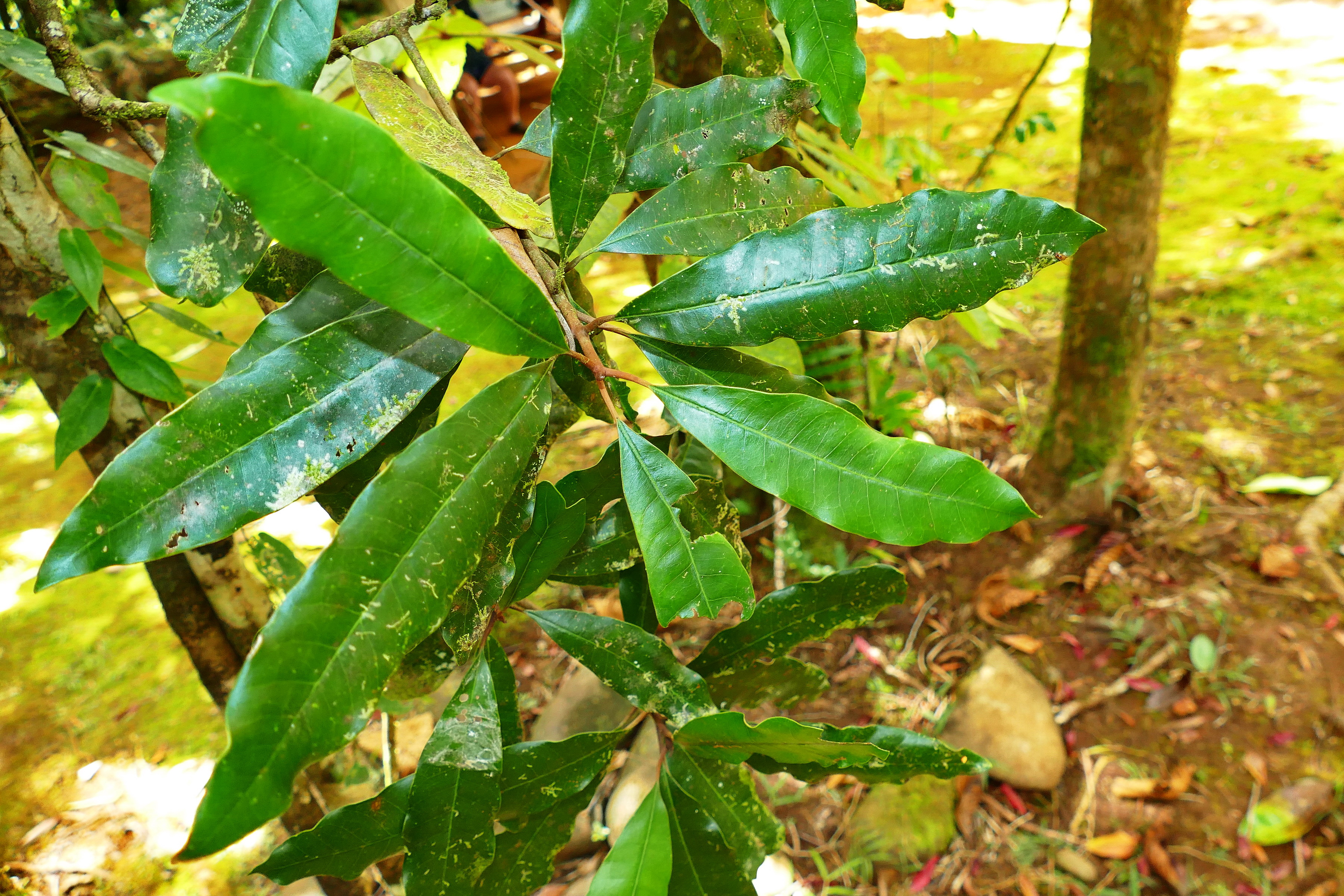

Scientific classification
- Kingdom: Plantae
- Clade: Embryophytes
- Clade: Tracheophytes
- Clade: Angiosperms
- Clade: Eudicots
- Clade: Asterids
- Order: Ericales
- Family: Sapotaceae
- Genus: Pycnandra
- Species: P. acuminata

Binomial name
- Pycnandra acuminata (Pierre ex Baill.) Swenson & Munzinger

Synonyms
- Niemeyera acuminata (Pierre ex Baill.) T.D.Penn.; Pouteria acuminata (Pierre ex Baill.) Baehni; Sebertia acuminata (Pierre ex Baill.) Engl.; Sersalisia acuminata Pierre ex Baill.; Chrysophyllum sarlinii Guillaumin; Trouettia sarlinii (Guillaumin) Aubrév.

= Pycnandra acuminata =

Species of shrub

Pycnandra acuminata is a species of plant in the family of Sapotaceae. It is a rainforest shrub, endemic to New Caledonia, and is adapted to the nickel-rich ultramafic soils found there. Pycnandra acuminata is notable as one of the most prolific hyperaccumulators of trace metals known, actively absorbing nickel from the soil and concentrating it within the plant to a concentration of up to 25% nickel citrate as dry weight of the sap, which is turquoise-green in colour due to the nickel content. It is the only known plant with turquoise sap. The vernacular name in French is sève bleue (blue sap).

The reason for this adaptation is not well established, but heavy metals such as nickel in soil are usually toxic to plants and it is thought that by complexing them into less-toxic organic salts and concentrating them in certain tissues, the plant may protect other more sensitive tissue from excess levels of toxic metal ions, or deter herbivores due to the toxicity. Such plants are of considerable interest due to their potential use in phytoremediation of heavy metal contaminated former mine sites, or potentially even as a means of non-destructive phytomining of metal-rich soils allowing metals to be harvested in an environmentally sustainable manner.

The tree's unusual affinity for nickel first came to light in the 1970s, and research into other hyperaccumulator plants has increased since then.
