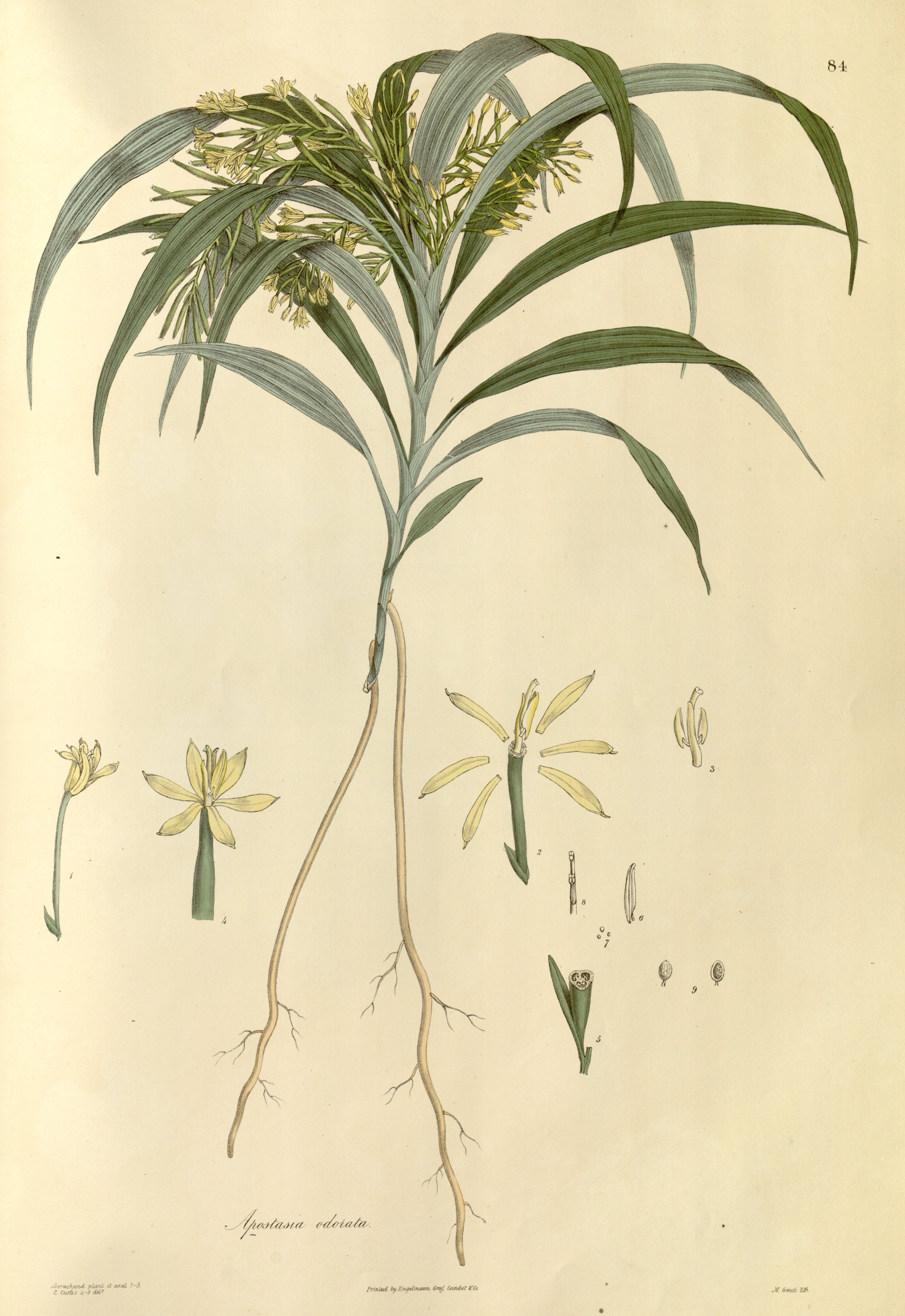
- Apostasia wallichii

Scientific classification
- Kingdom: Plantae
- Clade: Tracheophytes
- Clade: Angiosperms
- Clade: Monocots
- Order: Asparagales
- Family: Orchidaceae
- Subfamily: Apostasioideae; Horan. (1847)

Genera
- Apostasia; Neuwiedia
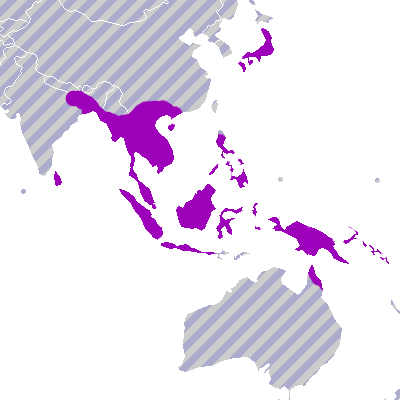
- Distribution of Apostasioideae

= Apostasioideae =

Apostasioid orchids

Subfamily of orchids

The subfamily Apostasioideae is one of five subfamilies recognised within the orchid family, Orchidaceae. Compared to the other orchid subfamilies, it is relatively species-poor, with only two genera (Neuwiedia and Apostasia) and 15 species.

Members of the subfamily are terrestrial plants found only in humid areas of northern Australia, Southeast Asia, Malaysia, and Japan.

The Apostasioideae are generally considered to be the sister group to all other orchid lineages based on molecular data and flower structure. All other orchid subfamilies with the exception of the Cypripedioideae are monandrous (possessing a single stamen), whereas Apostasioid orchids have 3 stamens.

== Bibliography ==
- Pridgeon, A.M.; Cribb, P.J.; Chase, M.W. & F. N. Rasmussen (1999): Genera Orchidacearum Vol.1, Oxford U. Press. ISBN 0-19-850513-2
