= List of Licania species =

List of plant species in the genus Licania.

== Species ==
As of September 2014 the World Checklist of Selected Plant Families and The Plant List recognise about 223 accepted taxa (of species and infraspecific names) in the plant genus Licania. In January 2023 Plants of the World Online (the replacement for Plant List) only accepted 103 Species.

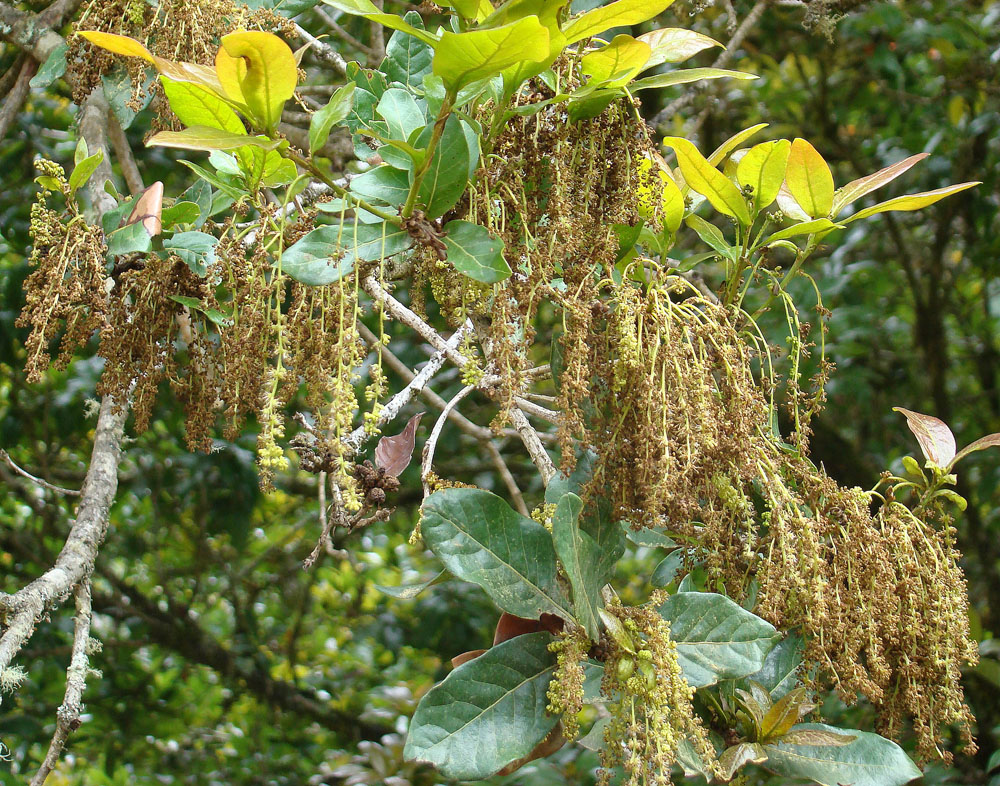
Licania arborea

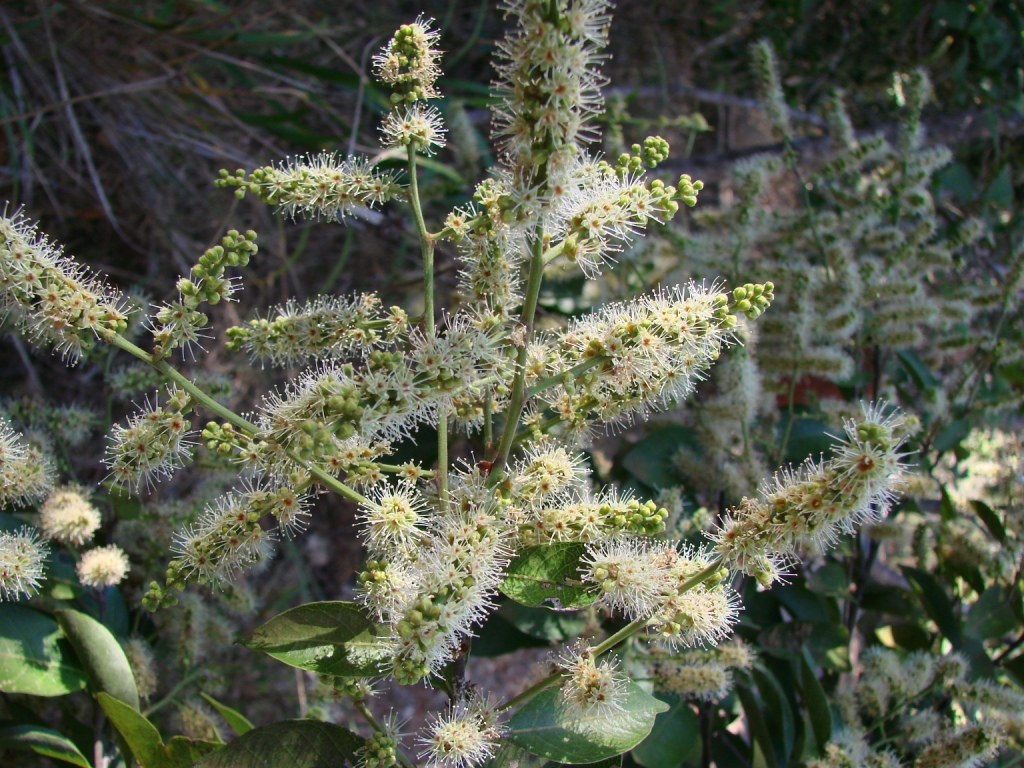
Licania humilis

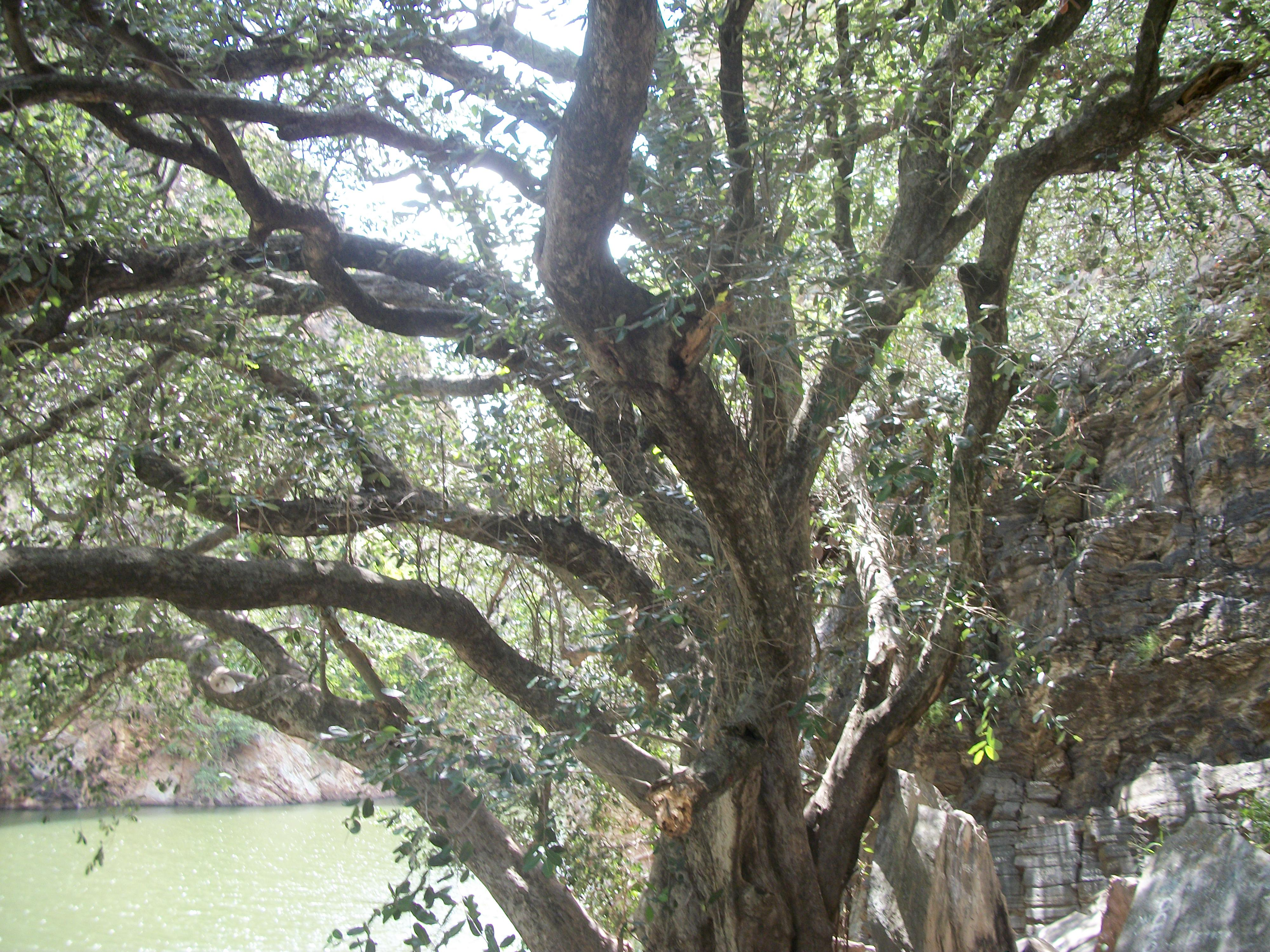
Licania rigida (oiticica)

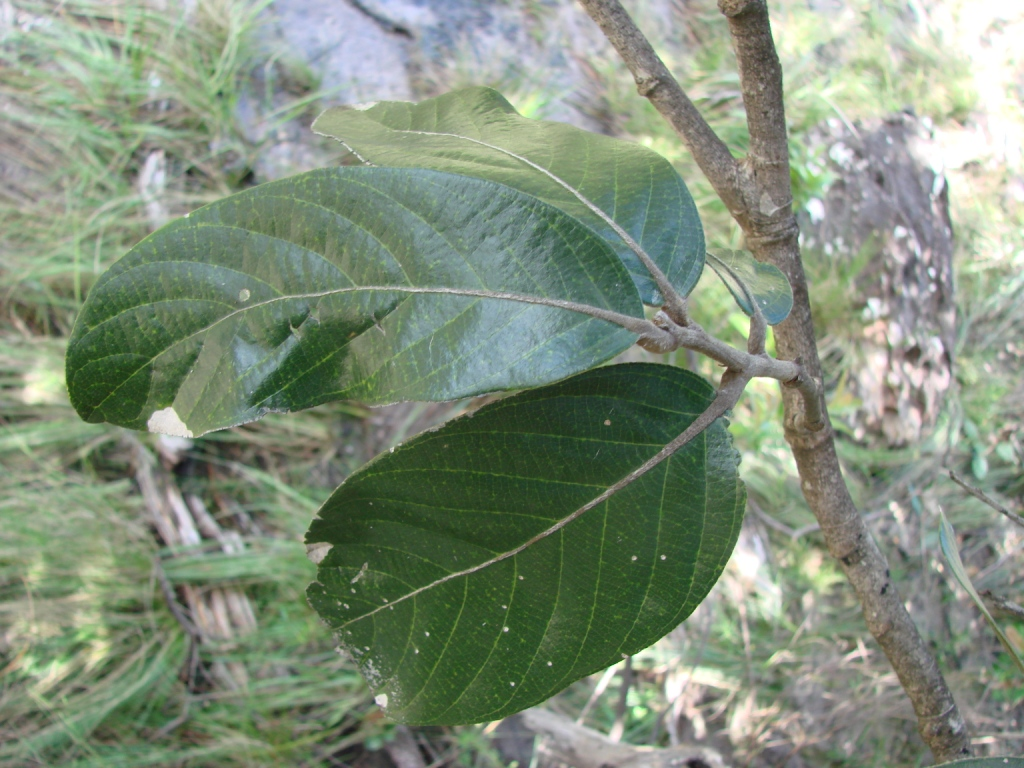
Licania sclerophylla

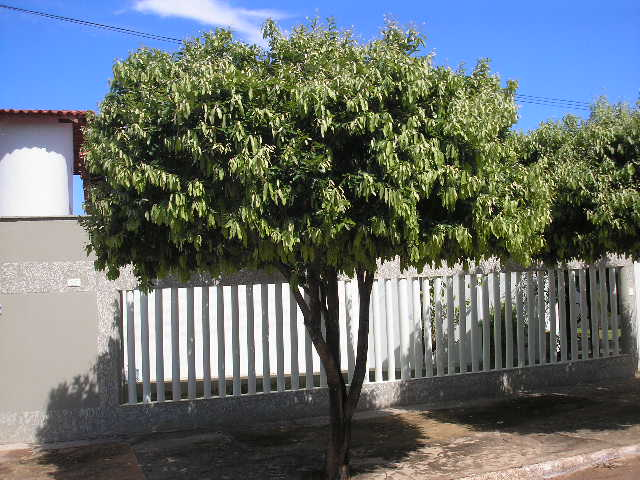
Licania tomentosa (oitizeiro)

== A ==
- Licania affinis Fritsch
- Licania alba (Bernoulli) Cuatrec.
- Licania apiculata Prance
- Licania apiknae Prance
- Licania aracaensis Prance
- Licania areolata Prance
- Licania arianeae Prance

== B ==
- Licania belemii Prance
- Licania bellingtonii Prance
- Licania blackii Prance
- Licania boyanii Tutin
- Licania bracteata Prance
- Licania buxifolia Sandwith

== C ==
- Licania caldasiana Cuatrec.
- Licania canescens Benoist
- Licania cidii Prance
- Licania compacta Fritsch
- Licania condoriensis Prance
- Licania cordata Prance
- Licania coriacea Benth.
- Licania corniculata Prance
- Licania couepiifolia Prance
- Licania crassivenia Spruce ex Hook.f.
- Licania cruegeriana Urb.
- Licania cuatrecasasii Prance
- Licania cuprea Sandwith
- Licania cuyabenensis Prance
- Licania cyathodes Benoist
- Licania cymosa Fritsch

== D ==
- Licania davillifolia Benoist
- Licania dealbata Hook.f.
- Licania densiflora Kleinh.
- Licania discolor Pilg.

== E ==
- Licania elliptica Standl.

== F ==
- Licania fanshawei Prance
- Licania farinacea Prance
- Licania ferreirae Prance
- Licania foldatsii Prance
- Licania furfuracea Prance

== G ==
- Licania glauca Cuatrec.
- Licania glazioviana Warm.
- Licania gracilipes Taub.

== H ==
- Licania harlingii Prance
- Licania hebantha Mart. ex Hook.f.
- Licania hitchcockii Maguire
- Licania hoehnei Pilg.
- Licania hypoleuca Benth.

== I ==
- Licania impressa Prance
- Licania incana Aubl.
- Licania indurata Pilg.
- Licania irwinii Prance

== J ==
- Licania jimenezii Prance

== K ==
- Licania kunthiana Hook.f.

== L ==
- Licania lamentanda Prance
- Licania lanceolata Prance
- Licania laxiflora Fritsch
- Licania leptostachya Benth.
- Licania littoralis Warm.

== M ==
- Licania majuscula Sagot
- Licania marleneae Prance
- Licania maxima Prance
- Licania membranacea Sagot ex Laness.
- Licania micrantha Miq.
- Licania microphylla Fanshawe & Maguire
- Licania minuscula Cuatrec.
- Licania mollis Benth.
- Licania monteagudensis Prance

== N ==
- Licania naviculistipula Prance
- Licania nelsonii Prance
- Licania niloi Prance
- Licania nitida Hook.f.

== O ==
- Licania orbicularis Spruce ex Hook.f.
- Licania ovalifolia Kleinh.

== P ==
- Licania pallida (Hook.f.) Spruce ex Sagot
- Licania paraensis Prance
- Licania parviflora Benth.
- Licania parvifructa Fanshawe & Maguire
- Licania piresii Prance
- Licania pittieri Prance
- Licania polita Spruce ex Hook.f.
- Licania pruinosa Benoist

== R ==
- Licania riedelii Prance
- Licania robusta Sagot
- Licania rodriguesii Prance
- Licania roraimensis Standl.
- Licania rufescens Klotzsch ex Fritsch

== S ==
- Licania sandwithii Prance
- Licania santosii Prance
- Licania savannarum Prance
- Licania silvae Prance
- Licania spicata Hook.f.
- Licania stewardii Prance
- Licania steyermarkii Maguire
- Licania stricta Kleinh.
- Licania subrotundata Maguire

== T ==
- Licania teixeirae Prance
- Licania tepuiensis Prance
- Licania ternatensis Hook.f. ex Duss
- Licania tocantina Prance
- Licania triandra Mart. ex Hook.f.
- Licania trigonioides J.F.Macbr.

== U ==
- Licania urceolaris Hook.f.

== V ==
- Licania vaupesiana Killip & Cuatrec.
- Licania velutina Prance
