= Granger (Tourtechot) =

French physician and traveller

Granger (c. 1680s in Dijon, Province of Burgundy – 1734 near Basra), was a French physician and traveller, with a major interest in natural history.

According to the preface of the only work attributed to him, his real name was Tourtechot, and for reasons not explained he changed it to Granger. Granger or Tourtechot is presumably his surname. Sometimes he is listed as Nicolas Granger, Tourtechot (de) Granger, or N. Granger.

In the 1720s he worked as a physician in a Christian hospital in Tunis, a position he acquired on account of his friend Jean Pierre Pignon, the French consul in Tunis at that time. Moving back to France in 1728, he accompanied Dignon to Egypt in 1731, when Pignon was assigned French Consul in Cairo. During his stay in Egypt, Granger travelled up the Nile to Aswan, documenting a large number of ancient monuments, as well as a considerable amount of its natural history, including animals, plants and minerals.

On his return from Egypt in 1732, Granger received a commission from King Louis XV, to travel around the Middle East and acquire any kind of information that could help advance the knowledge of natural history in general. Leaving France in 1733 he managed to visit Crete, Egypt again, Cyprus, Palestine and Syria, but died en route toward Persian, two days march from Basra.

Granger's account and notes was published in French in 1745, in German 1751 and in English 1773. The flower Grangeria of the family Chrysobalanaceae is named after him.

== Works ==
- Relation du voyage fait en Egypte, par le sieur Granger, en l'année 1730. Où l'on voit ce qu'il y a de plus remarquable, particulièrement sur l'histoire naturelle, Paris, Jacques Vincent, 1745.

- (German trans.) Des Herrn Grangers Beschreibung seiner in dem Jahre 1730 durch Egypten gethanen Reise, vorin das merkvurdigste in diesem Lande, insonderheit was die Naturgeschichte betrifft, beschrieben ist. – published in Sammlung aller Reisen, Gottingen, 1751, Theil III, pp. 307-428
- (English trans.) A Journey through Egypt made in the year 1730, in which there are to be found the most remarkable particulars on Natural History. Translated from the French by John Reinhold Forster, London, 1773.
