= Hunga guillauminii =

Conservation status
- Endangered (IUCN 3.1)

Scientific classification
- Kingdom: Plantae
- Clade: Tracheophytes
- Clade: Angiosperms
- Clade: Eudicots
- Clade: Rosids
- Order: Malpighiales
- Family: Chrysobalanaceae
- Genus: Hunga
- Species: H. guillauminii

Binomial name
- Hunga guillauminii Prance

Species of flowering plant

Hunga guillauminii is a species of plant in the family Chrysobalanaceae. It is endemic to New Caledonia.
