= Magnistipula cuneatifolia =

Conservation status
- Endangered (IUCN 3.1)

Scientific classification
- Kingdom: Plantae
- Clade: Tracheophytes
- Clade: Angiosperms
- Clade: Eudicots
- Clade: Rosids
- Order: Malpighiales
- Family: Chrysobalanaceae
- Genus: Magnistipula
- Species: M. cuneatifolia

Binomial name
- Magnistipula cuneatifolia Haum.

Species of plant

Magnistipula cuneatifolia is a species of plant in the family Chrysobalanaceae. It is found in Cameroon and Gabon. Its natural habitat is subtropical or tropical dry forests. It is threatened by habitat loss.
