= Hunga cordata =

Conservation status
- Endangered (IUCN 3.1)

Scientific classification
- Kingdom: Plantae
- Clade: Tracheophytes
- Clade: Angiosperms
- Clade: Eudicots
- Clade: Rosids
- Order: Malpighiales
- Family: Chrysobalanaceae
- Genus: Hunga
- Species: H. cordata

Binomial name
- Hunga cordata Prance

Species of flowering plant

Hunga cordata is a species of plant in the family Chrysobalanaceae. It is endemic to New Caledonia.
