= Licania ternatensis =

Scientific classification
- Kingdom: Plantae
- Clade: Embryophytes
- Clade: Tracheophytes
- Clade: Angiosperms
- Clade: Eudicots
- Clade: Rosids
- Order: Malpighiales
- Family: Chrysobalanaceae
- Genus: Licania
- Species: L. ternatensis

Binomial name
- Licania ternatensis Hook.f. ex Duss

Species of plant

Licania ternatensis is a species of flowering plant native to the southeastern Caribbean. It is known locally as bwa dyab (in Dominica and Martinique), bois gris or bwa gri (in Grenada, French Guiana, Guadeloupe, and Martinique,) or bois de masse or bwa di mas (in Saint Lucia). It is one of the most common rainforest trees in Dominica, St Lucia, St Vincent, and Grenada.

== Taxonomy ==
Licania ternatensis was described by Antoine Duss and Joseph Dalton Hooker in 1897. It is in the genus Licania and family Chrysobalanaceae. No subspecies is listed in the Catalogue of Life.

== Etymology ==
The local names for Licania ternatensis are French and French Antillean Creole: bois diable and bwa dyab mean "devil wood"; bois gris and bwa gri mean "grey wood"; and bois de masse and bwa di mas mean "mass wood" or "solid wood".

| French Antillean Creole | French | English | Ref |
|---|---|---|---|
| bwa | bois | wood | |
| dyab | diable | devil | |
| gri | gris | grey | |
| di mas | de masse | mass/solid | |
