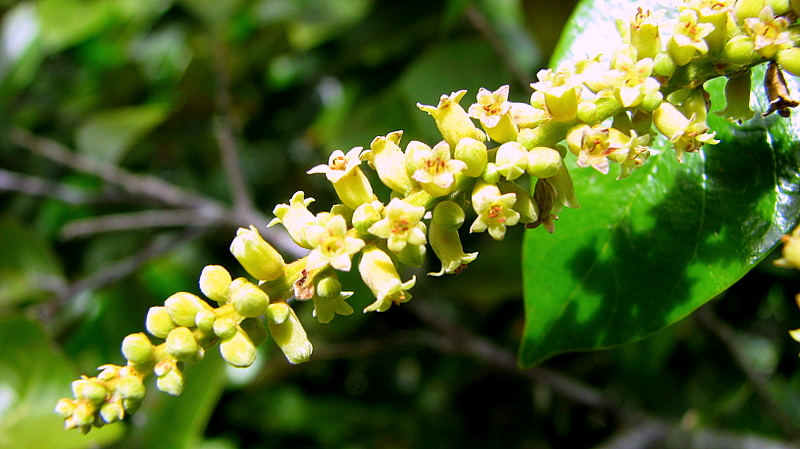
- Licania nitida in Brazil

Scientific classification
- Kingdom: Plantae
- Clade: Tracheophytes
- Clade: Angiosperms
- Clade: Eudicots
- Clade: Rosids
- Order: Malpighiales
- Family: Chrysobalanaceae
- Genus: Licania; Aubl.

Diversity
- About 100 species

Synonyms
- Hedycrea Schreb.

= Licania =

Genus of plants

Licania is a genus of over 100 species of trees and shrubs in the family Chrysobalanaceae. Species are found naturally occurring in neotropical forests from southern Mexico to Brazil and the Lesser Antilles. Due to increased deforestation and loss of habitat, several species have declined, some markedly so, and L. caldasiana from Colombia appears to have gone extinct in recent years. Many species are either rare or restricted in distribution and therefore potentially threatened with future extinction. In 2016, a new circumscription of Licania was outlined, with over 100 species being placed in other genera such as Moquilea, Leptobalanus, Hymenopus, Microdesmia, Parinariopsis, Geobalanus and Cordillera.

Several species are used as ornamental plants. Licania fruit are important food for many animals and can also be eaten by humans. Caterpillars of a possible new taxon of the Astraptes fulgerator cryptic species complex were found on Licania arborea (now Microdesmia arborea) but do not seem to eat them regularly. Like other members of its family, the genus is known for producing a diverse array of flavonoid compounds.

== Selected species ==
Species include:

- Licania caldasiana
- Licania velutina
