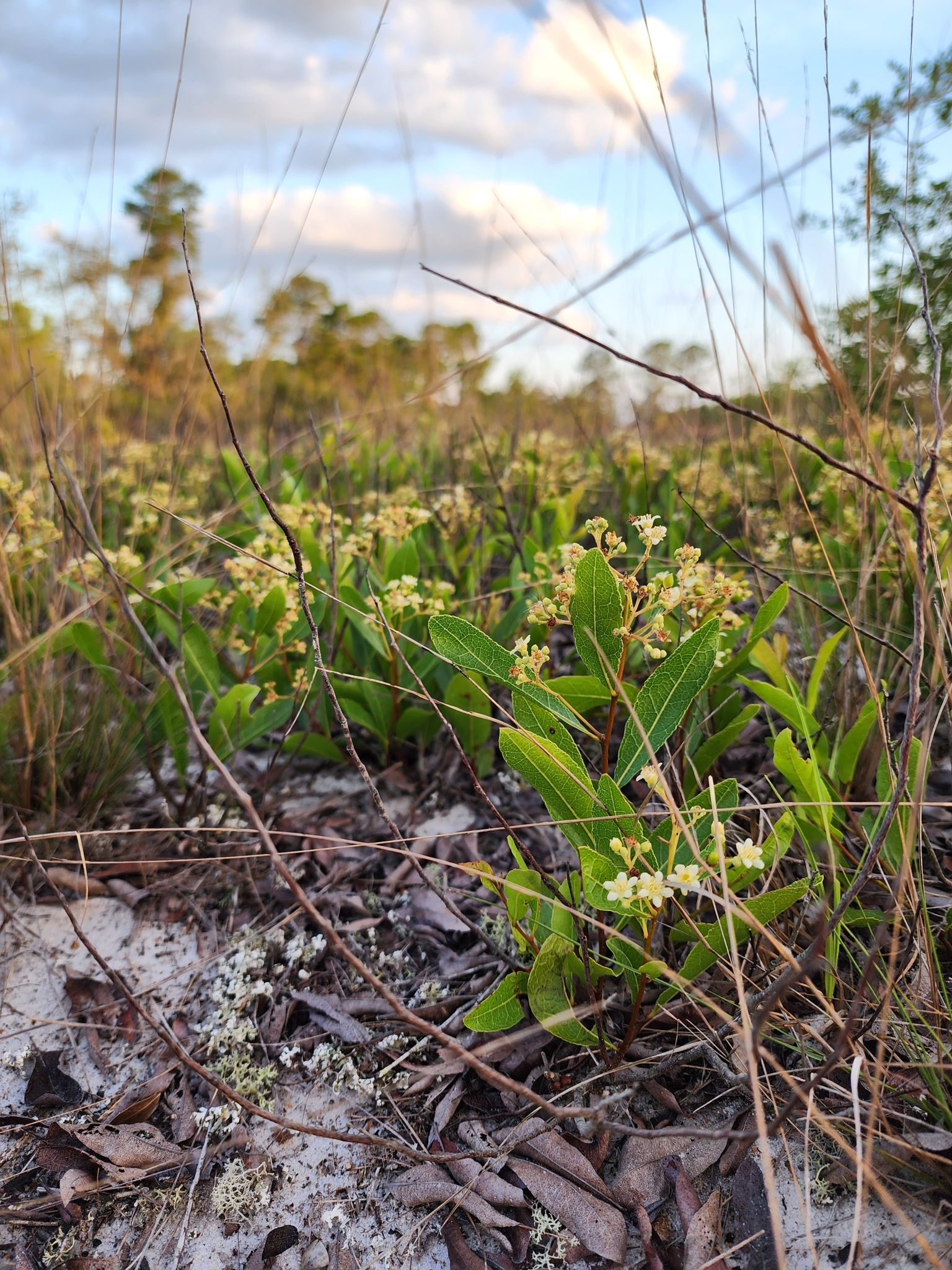

Conservation status
- Apparently Secure (NatureServe)

Scientific classification
- Kingdom: Plantae
- Clade: Tracheophytes
- Clade: Angiosperms
- Clade: Eudicots
- Clade: Rosids
- Order: Malpighiales
- Family: Chrysobalanaceae
- Genus: Geobalanus
- Species: G. oblongifolius

Binomial name
- Geobalanus oblongifolius (Michx.) Small

Synonyms
- Chrysobalanus incanus Raf. in New Fl. 3: 26 (1838), nom. superfl.; Chrysobalanus oblongifolius Michx. in Fl. Bor.-Amer. 1: 283 (1803); Chrysobalanus pallidus (Small) L.B.Sm. in Rhodora 48: 136 (1946); Chrysobalanus prunifolius Raf. in New Fl. 3: 26 (1838); Chrysobalanus retusus Raf. in New Fl. 3: 26 (1838); Geobalanus pallidus Small in Fl. Miami: 81 (1913); Licania michauxii Prance in J. Arnold Arbor. 51: 526 (1970); Persea longipeda Bertol. in Misc. Bot. 13: 14 (1853)

= Geobalanus oblongifolius =

Species of shrub

Geobalanus oblongifolius, commonly known as gopher apple, is an evergreen shrub. It grows in the sandhills of peninsular Florida as well as coastal Mississippi, Alabama, Louisiana, South Carolina and Georgia.

The fruit is a food source for the gopher tortoise and many other species of wildlife.

It was originally published as Licania michauxii by British botanist G.T. Prance in J. Arnold Arbor. vol. 51 on page 526 in 1970. It was renamed as Geobalanus oblongifolius by (Michx.) Small and re-published in Fl. Miami: 81 (1913). Although it is still known by its former name in some sources.

== Gallery ==
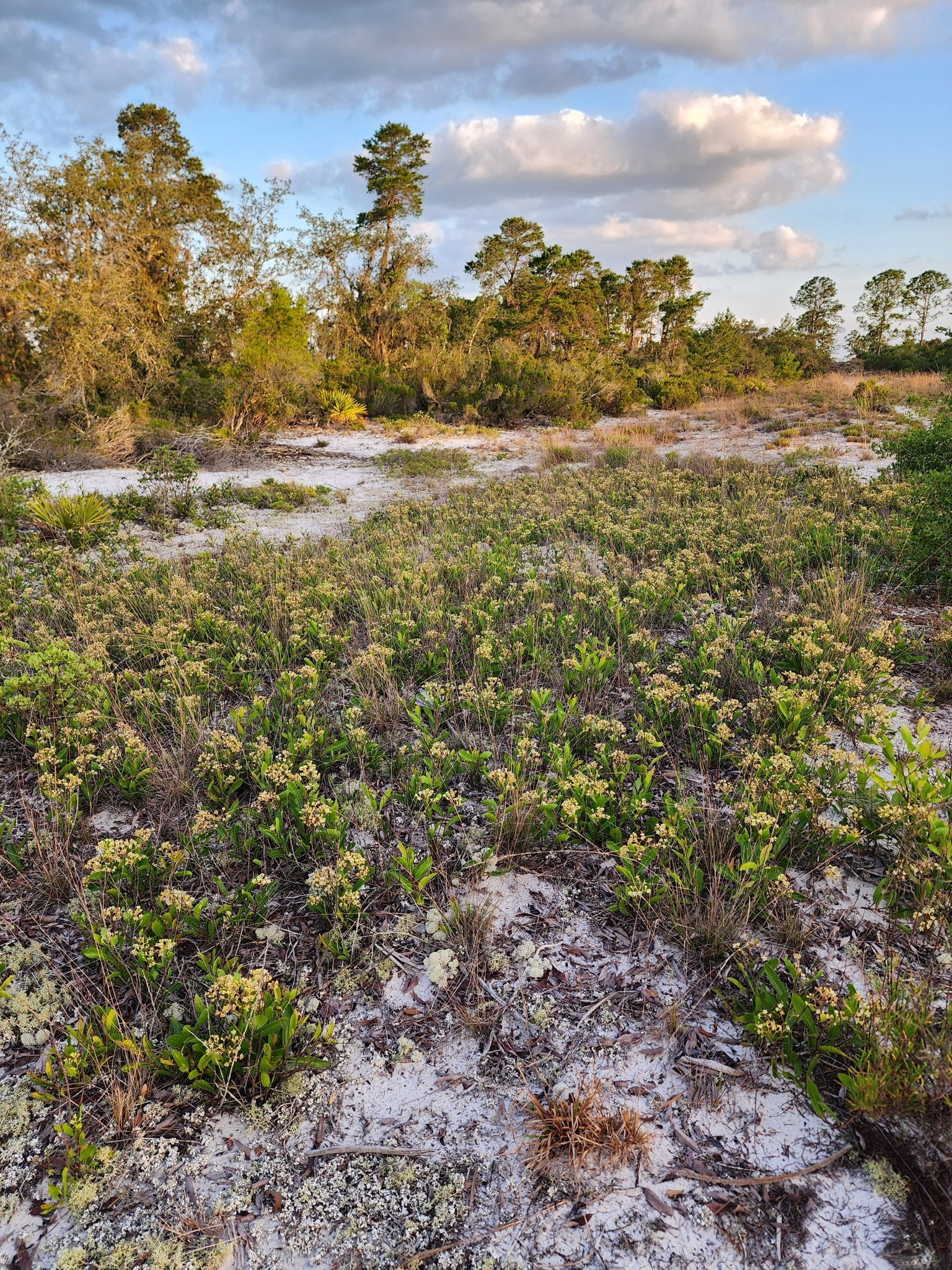
Subpopulation on sandhill at Carter Creek WMA

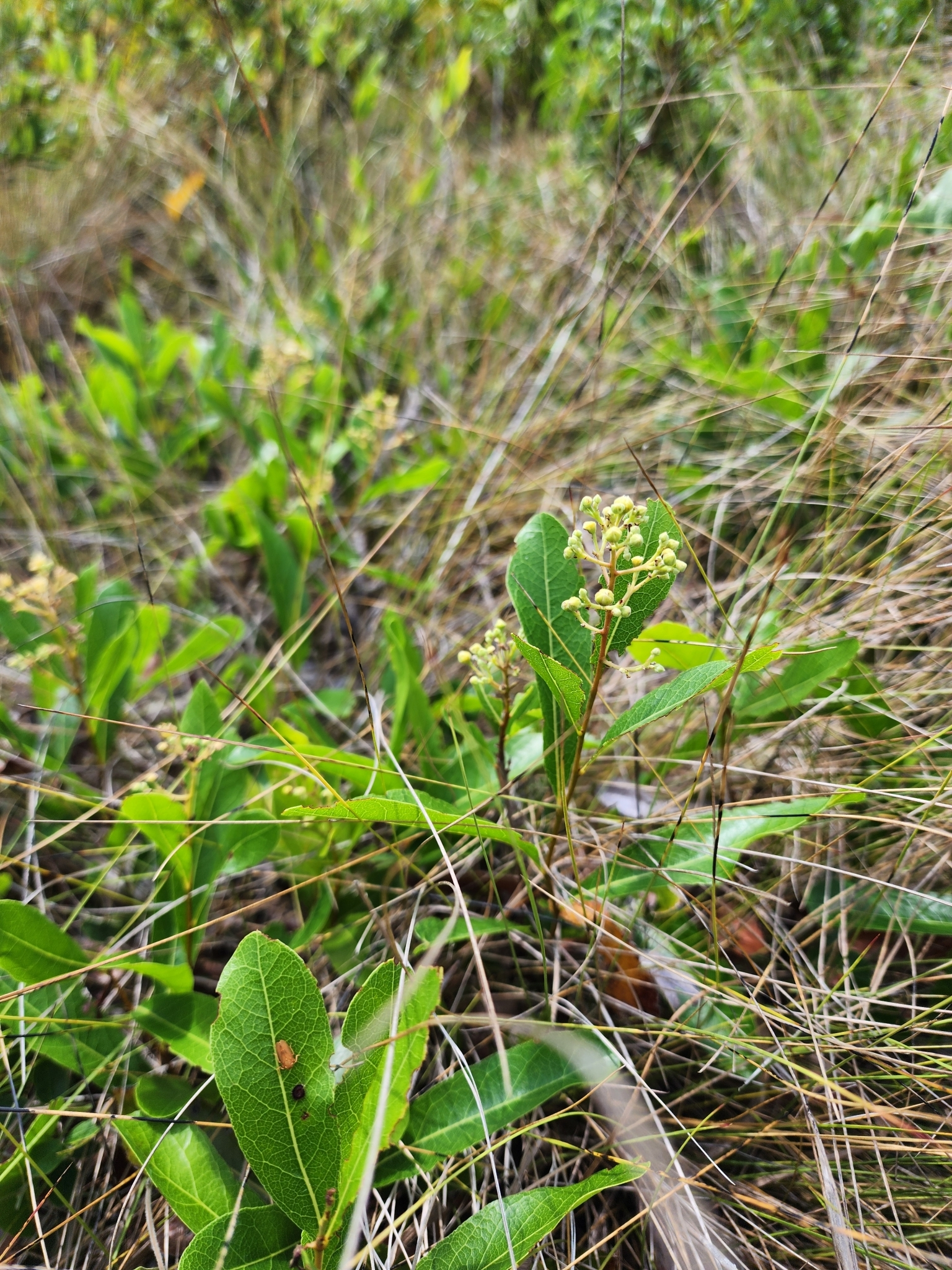
Sprouting buds

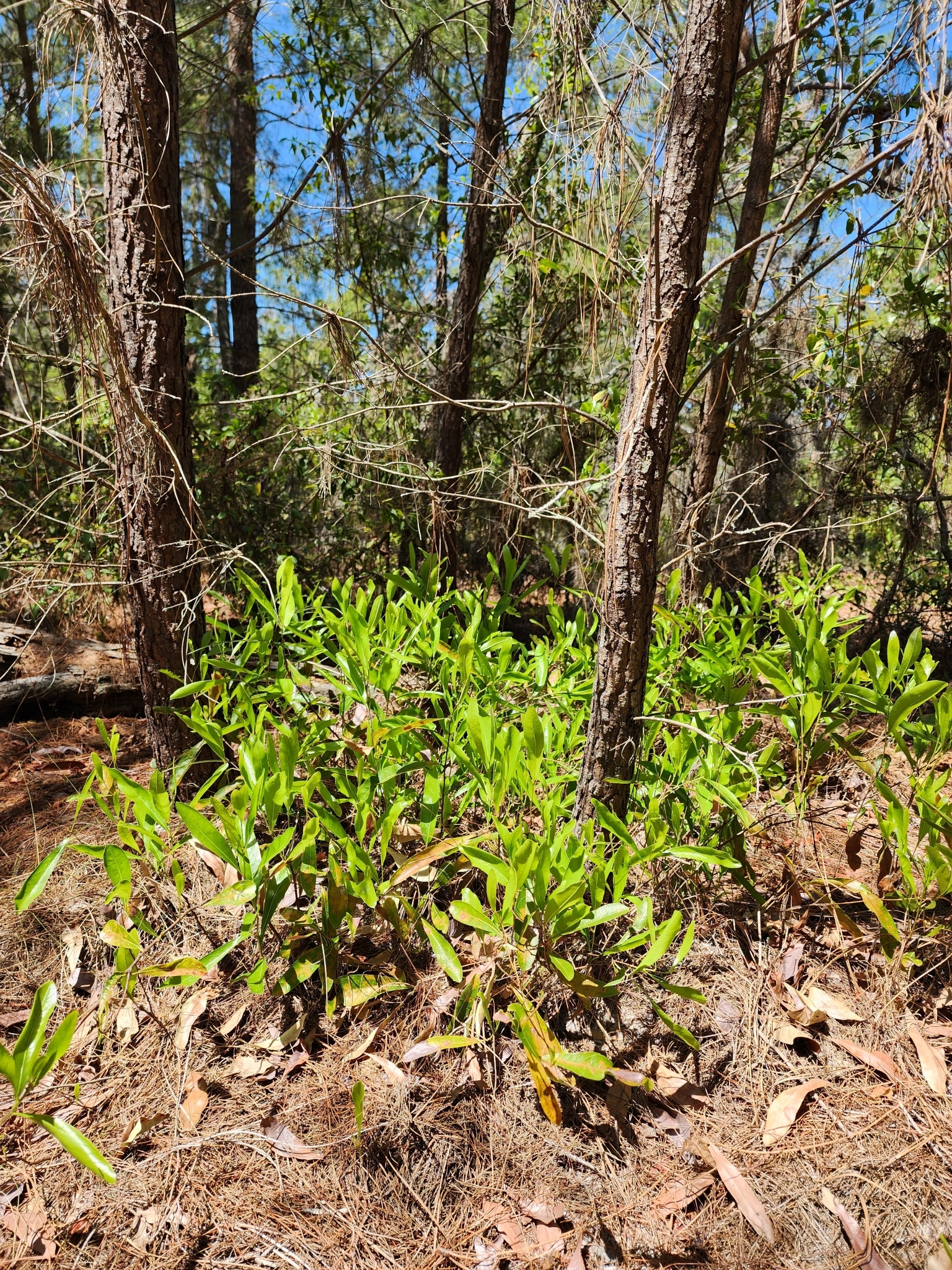
Subpopulation at base of pines

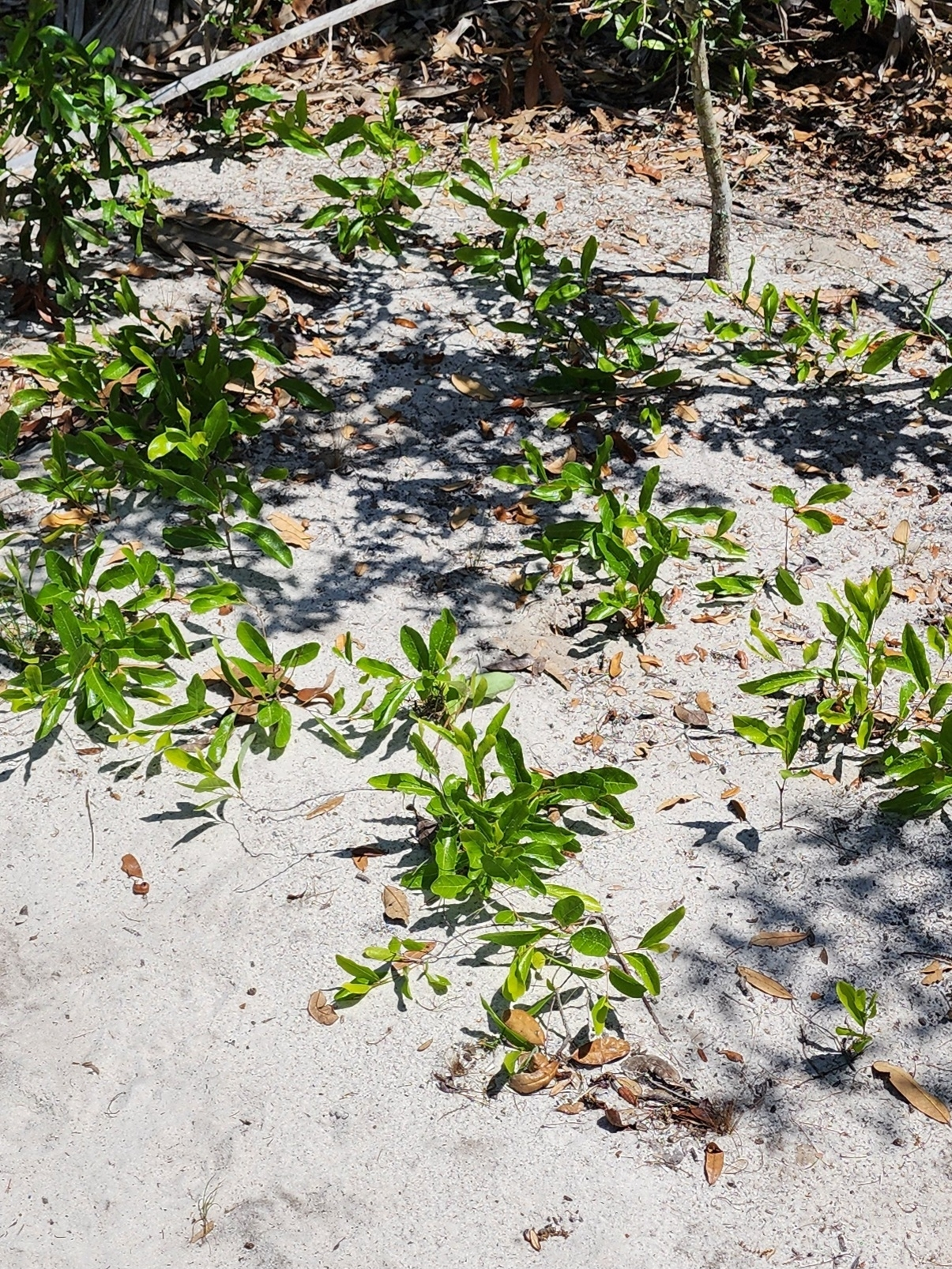
Growing in deep, white sands

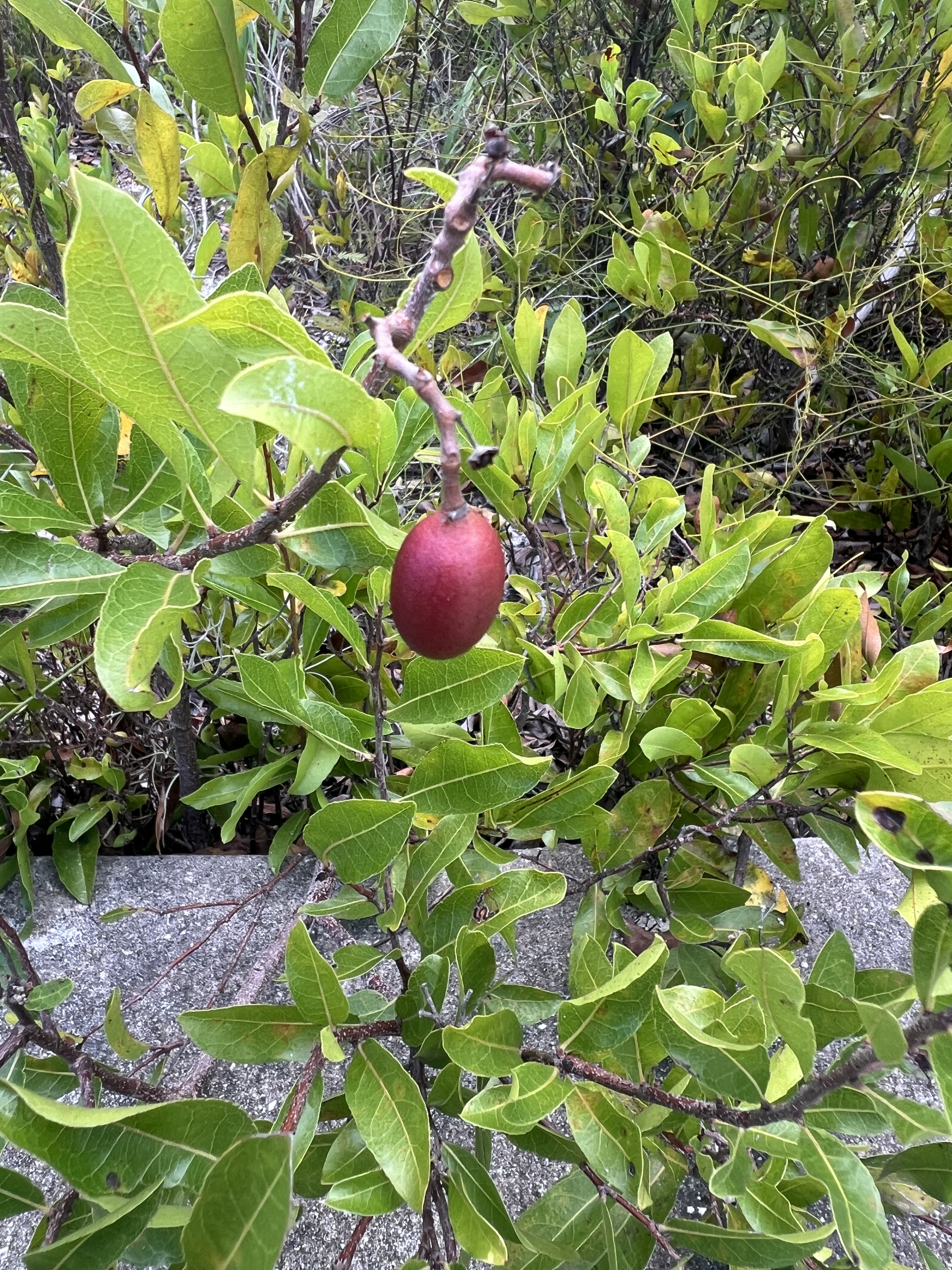
Gopher apple fruit

== Other sources ==
- Prance, G. T. 1972. Chrysobalanaceae. Fl. Neotrop. Monogr. 9:42-43.
- Wunderlin, R. P. 1998. Guide to the vascular plants of Florida
