= A. edulis =

A. edulis may refer to:

- Acioa edulis, the Castanha-de-cutia, a fruit and timber tree species
- Aglaia edulis, a plant species found in Bhutan, Cambodia, China, India, Indonesia and Malaysia
- Allophylus edulis, a plant species endemic to Guyanas, Brazil, Bolivia, Paraguay, Argentina and Uruguay

== Synonyms ==
- Aranea edulis, a synonym for the Australian spider Nephila edulis

== See also ==
- Edulis (disambiguation)
