= Leptobalanus morii =

Conservation status
- Least Concern (IUCN 3.1)

Scientific classification
- Kingdom: Plantae
- Clade: Embryophytes
- Clade: Tracheophytes
- Clade: Angiosperms
- Clade: Eudicots
- Clade: Rosids
- Order: Malpighiales
- Family: Chrysobalanaceae
- Genus: Leptobalanus
- Species: L. morii

Binomial name
- Leptobalanus morii (Prance) Sothers & Prance

Synonyms
- Licania morii Prance

Species of flowering plant

Leptobalanus morii, synonym Licania morii, is a species of plant in the family Chrysobalanaceae. It is a tree endemic to Panama.
