= Hunga mackeeana =

Conservation status
- Vulnerable (IUCN 3.1)

Scientific classification
- Kingdom: Plantae
- Clade: Tracheophytes
- Clade: Angiosperms
- Clade: Eudicots
- Clade: Rosids
- Order: Malpighiales
- Family: Chrysobalanaceae
- Genus: Hunga
- Species: H. mackeeana

Binomial name
- Hunga mackeeana Prance

Species of flowering plant

Hunga mackeeana is a species of plant in the family Chrysobalanaceae. It is endemic to New Caledonia.
