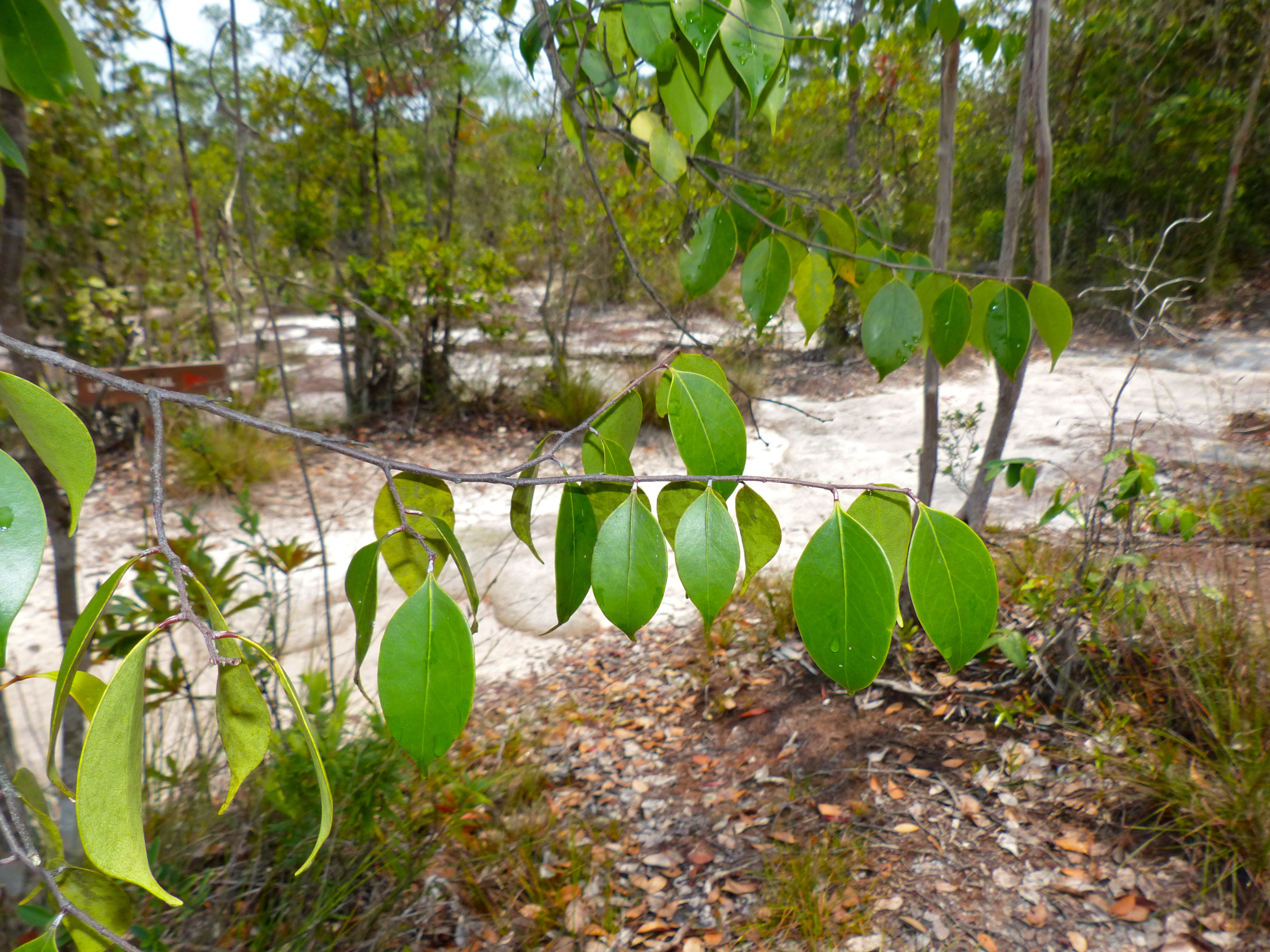

Scientific classification
- Kingdom: Plantae
- Clade: Tracheophytes
- Clade: Angiosperms
- Clade: Eudicots
- Clade: Rosids
- Order: Malpighiales
- Family: Chrysobalanaceae
- Genus: Parastemon
- Species: P. urophyllus

Binomial name
- Parastemon urophyllus (Wall. ex A.DC.) A.DC.

Synonyms
- Angelesia racemosa (Korth.) Kuntze; Diemenia racemosa Korth.; Embelia urophylla Wall. ex A.DC.; Parastemon spicatum Ridl.; Trichocarya racemosa (Korth.) Miq.

= Parastemon urophyllus =

Species of tree

Parastemon urophyllus is a tree in the family Chrysobalanaceae. The specific epithet urophyllus is from the Greek meaning "tail leaf", referring to how the leaf tapers to a sharp point.

== Description ==
Parastemon urophyllus grows up to 35 metres (110 ft) tall. The brownish bark is smooth. The ellipsoid fruits measure up to 1.5 cm (0.6 in) long. The timber is a heavy hardwood used in construction and as firewood.

== Distribution and habitat ==
Parastemon urophyllus grows naturally in the Nicobar Islands, Thailand and western Malesia. Its habitat is peat swamp, kerangas and secondary forests.
