= Angelesia splendens =

Conservation status
- Least Concern (IUCN 2.3)

Scientific classification
- Kingdom: Plantae
- Clade: Tracheophytes
- Clade: Angiosperms
- Clade: Eudicots
- Clade: Rosids
- Order: Malpighiales
- Family: Chrysobalanaceae
- Genus: Angelesia
- Species: A. splendens

Binomial name
- Angelesia splendens Korth.

Synonyms
- Atuna nitida (Hook.f.) Panigrahi & K.M.Purohit; Coccomelia nitida (Hook.f.) Ridl.; Ferolia nitida (Hook.f.) Kuntze; Licania splendens (Korth.) Prance; Parinari nitida Hook.f.; Trichocarya splendens (Korth.) Miq.

Species of tree

Angelesia splendens is a tree in the family Chrysobalanaceae. The specific epithet splendens is from the Latin meaning 'shining', referring to surfaces of the dried leaves.

== Description ==
Angelesia splendens grows up to 25 metres (80 ft) tall. The bark is smooth to scaly. The ellipsoid fruits measure up to 1.3 cm (0.5 in) long. The strong durable timber is locally used for railway ties and in saltwater construction. The fruit is considered edible.

== Distribution and habitat ==
Angelesia splendens is native to southern Thailand and western and central Malesia (Peninsular Malaysia, Sumatra, Borneo, Java, Sulawesi, and the Philippines). Its habitat is dipterocarp forests, swamps and seashores to 400 m (1,300 ft) elevation.
