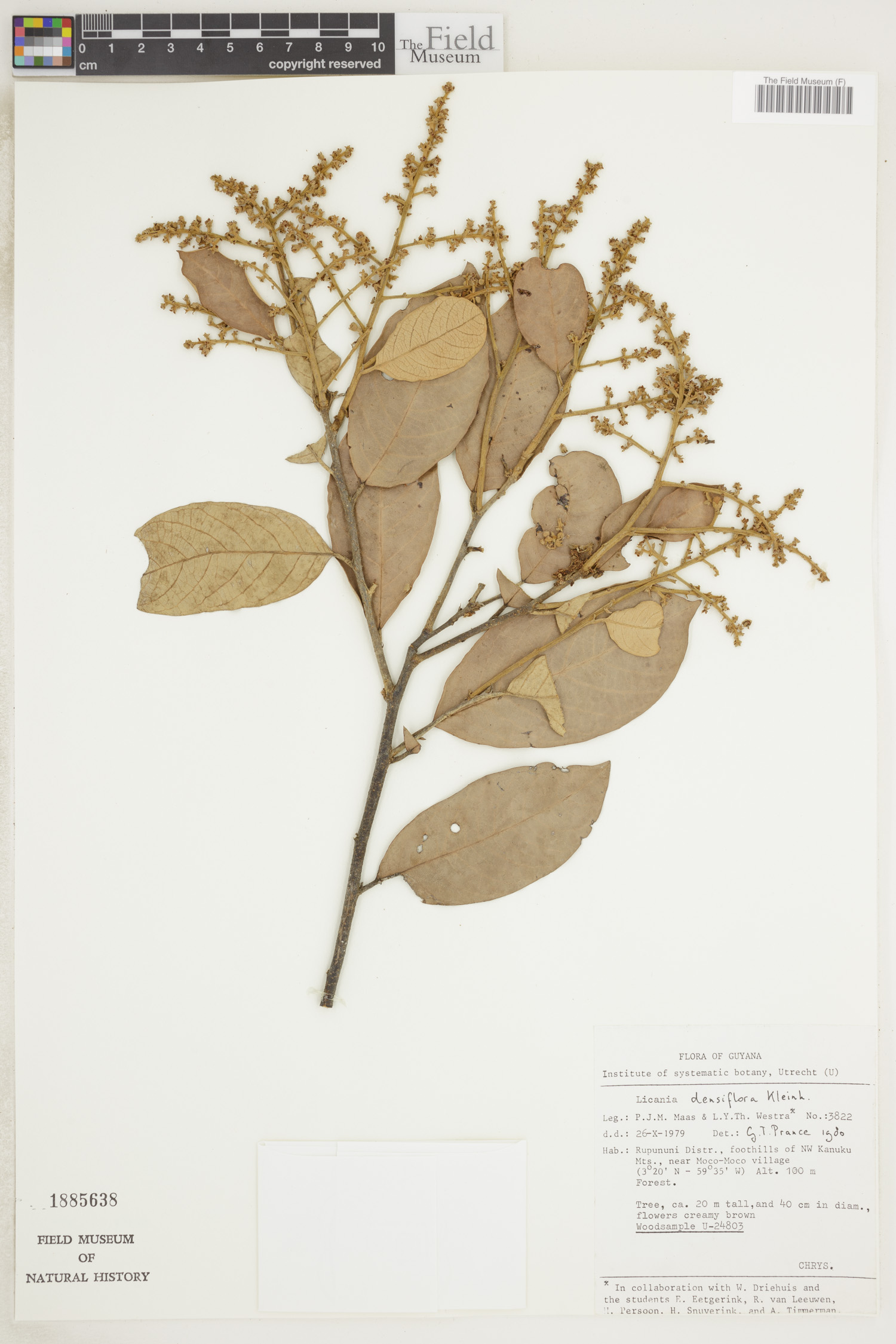
- A plant press specimen of Licania densiflora collected in Guyana

Conservation status
- Least Concern (IUCN 3.1)

Scientific classification
- Kingdom: Plantae
- Clade: Embryophytes
- Clade: Tracheophytes
- Clade: Spermatophytes
- Clade: Angiosperms
- Clade: Eudicots
- Clade: Rosids
- Order: Malpighiales
- Family: Chrysobalanaceae
- Genus: Licania
- Species: L. densiflora

Binomial name
- Licania densiflora Néerl. (1933)
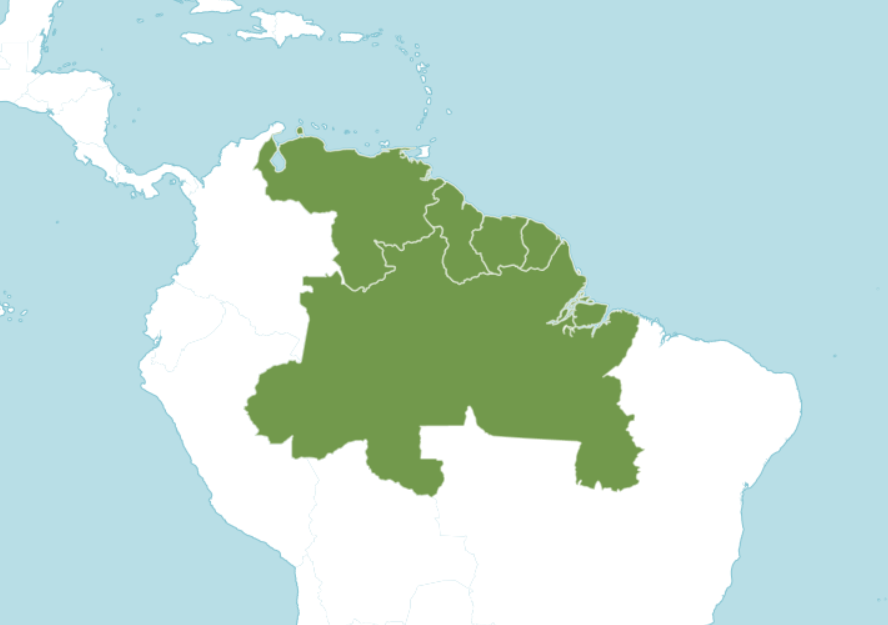
- Native range of Licania densiflora

= Licania densiflora =

Species of tree

Licania densiflora is a species of trees in the family Chrysobalanaceae. It can be used as a source of timber.

== Description ==
It grows as a tall single-trunk tree, which is noted to be around 30 meters tall, and has grey-brown bark with a slightly rough texture. Mature bark is darker grey with warty lenticels.

The sapwood and heartwood is a pastel reddish brown and almost cream color, while leaves have a glossy green top with a duller lighter green underside.

It is overall oblong shaped with entire margin and variation in leaf tips ranging from acuminate to obtuse, and has an alternate leave arrangement.

It can also have flowers in the form of tiny inconspicuous creamy white bundles arranged on a raceme inflorescence.

== Range ==
Its native range covers French Guiana, Guyana, Suriname, Venezuela and Northern Brazil. This range encompasses the wet tropical zone that the plant thrives in.

== Habitat ==
It is found in the forests and hills of Brazil, Venezuela, and the Guianas. An area characterized by a warm humid climate with many rivers.

In Guyana, it is a common canopy-dominant tree in seasonal forests. These evergreen seasonal forests are characterized by well-drained soils in areas where there is a marked period of rainfall distribution during the year. The essential distinction being the months of the dry season and the rainy season.

== Ecology ==
Fruits of the genus licania are noted to be an important food source for many animals and are edible for humans. It appears that the genus is facing a decline due to deforestation. This diminishes the sources of food of all those organisms that rely on these licania fruits.

== Etymology ==
In Venezuela, it has three common names which are Guanay, Hierrito and Merecurillo. Hierrito appears to root from the word 'hierro' which means iron, and if translated the word would mean little iron. On the other hand, Guanay and Mercurillo appear to be words used to refer to trees of the Coco Plum family(Chrysobalanaceae) and those related. There is an instance of the two words being used as common names for the species Parinari campestris which is in the family chrysobalanaceae. Perhaps these are a case of Spanish and indigenous language word fusion.

In Guyana and Suriname it is known as Marshiballi. The suffix -balli comes from Arawakan languages and it means 'like', which refers to a certain preceding plant that is similar and usually related to the named plant. It may also be used to distinguish plants found in the same habitat. This is somewhat similar to the use of 'maple' and 'oak' when referring to the species and relatives of genera acer and quercus respectively.

In French guiana, it has a couple common names of maroon, indigenous, creole and French origin. It is hard to infer the meanings of the words of maroon/indigenous languages as there are few sources on those languages.

- Paamaka (Maroon): bukutru-gateu-duwẽ
- Kali'na (Carib): pesisilan
- Nengee tongo (Maroon): baaka kookoo
- Creole: bwa-golèt- bwa which can mean timber in French creole +creole gaulette= little pole timber.
- French: gaulette-Reverse translation into French it returns the words "petite gaule" which has a variety of meanings. One of the meanings little pole, is reminiscent of the Hierrito (little iron) of Venezuela.
