= Magnistipula conrauana =

Conservation status
- Endangered (IUCN 3.1)

Scientific classification
- Kingdom: Plantae
- Clade: Tracheophytes
- Clade: Angiosperms
- Clade: Eudicots
- Clade: Rosids
- Order: Malpighiales
- Family: Chrysobalanaceae
- Genus: Magnistipula
- Species: M. conrauana

Binomial name
- Magnistipula conrauana Engl.

Synonyms
- Hirtella conrauana (Engl.) A.Chev.

Species of plant

Magnistipula conrauana is a species of plant in the family Chrysobalanaceae. It is endemic to Cameroon. Its natural habitats are subtropical or tropical moist lowland forests and subtropical or tropical moist montane forests. It is threatened by habitat loss.
