= Kostermanthus heteropetalus =

Conservation status
- Least Concern (IUCN 3.1)

Scientific classification
- Kingdom: Plantae
- Clade: Tracheophytes
- Clade: Angiosperms
- Clade: Eudicots
- Clade: Rosids
- Order: Malpighiales
- Family: Chrysobalanaceae
- Genus: Kostermanthus
- Species: K. heteropetalus

Binomial name
- Kostermanthus heteropetalus (Scort. ex King) Prance

Synonyms
- Acioa heteropetala (Scort. ex King) Kosterm.; Acioa percoriacea Kosterm.; Parinari heteropetala Scort. ex King; Parinari kunsteri King; Parinari myriandra Merr.

Species of tree

Kostermanthus heteropetalus is a tree in the family Chrysobalanaceae. The specific epithet heteropetalus is from the Greek meaning 'uneven or unequal petals'.

== Description ==
Kostermanthus heteropetalus grows up to 35 metres (110 ft) tall with a trunk diameter of up to 2 metres (6 ft 7 in). The fissured bark is grey-brown. The flowers are pink, tinged white. The ovoid fruits measure up to 4 cm (2 in) long.

== Distribution and habitat ==
Kostermanthus heteropetalus grows naturally in Sumatra, Peninsular Malaysia, Borneo, the Philippines and Sulawesi. Its habitat is mixed dipterocarp forests from sea-level to 500 metres (1,600 ft) elevation.
