= Hunga gerontogea =

Conservation status
- Near Threatened (IUCN 3.1)

Scientific classification
- Kingdom: Plantae
- Clade: Tracheophytes
- Clade: Angiosperms
- Clade: Eudicots
- Clade: Rosids
- Order: Malpighiales
- Family: Chrysobalanaceae
- Genus: Hunga
- Species: H. gerontogea

Binomial name
- Hunga gerontogea (Schltr.) Prance

Synonyms
- Licania gerontogea Schltr.; Parinari neocaledonica Baker f.

Species of plant

Hunga gerontogea is a species of flowering plant in the family Chrysobalanaceae. It is a shrub or tree endemic to northwestern New Caledonia.
