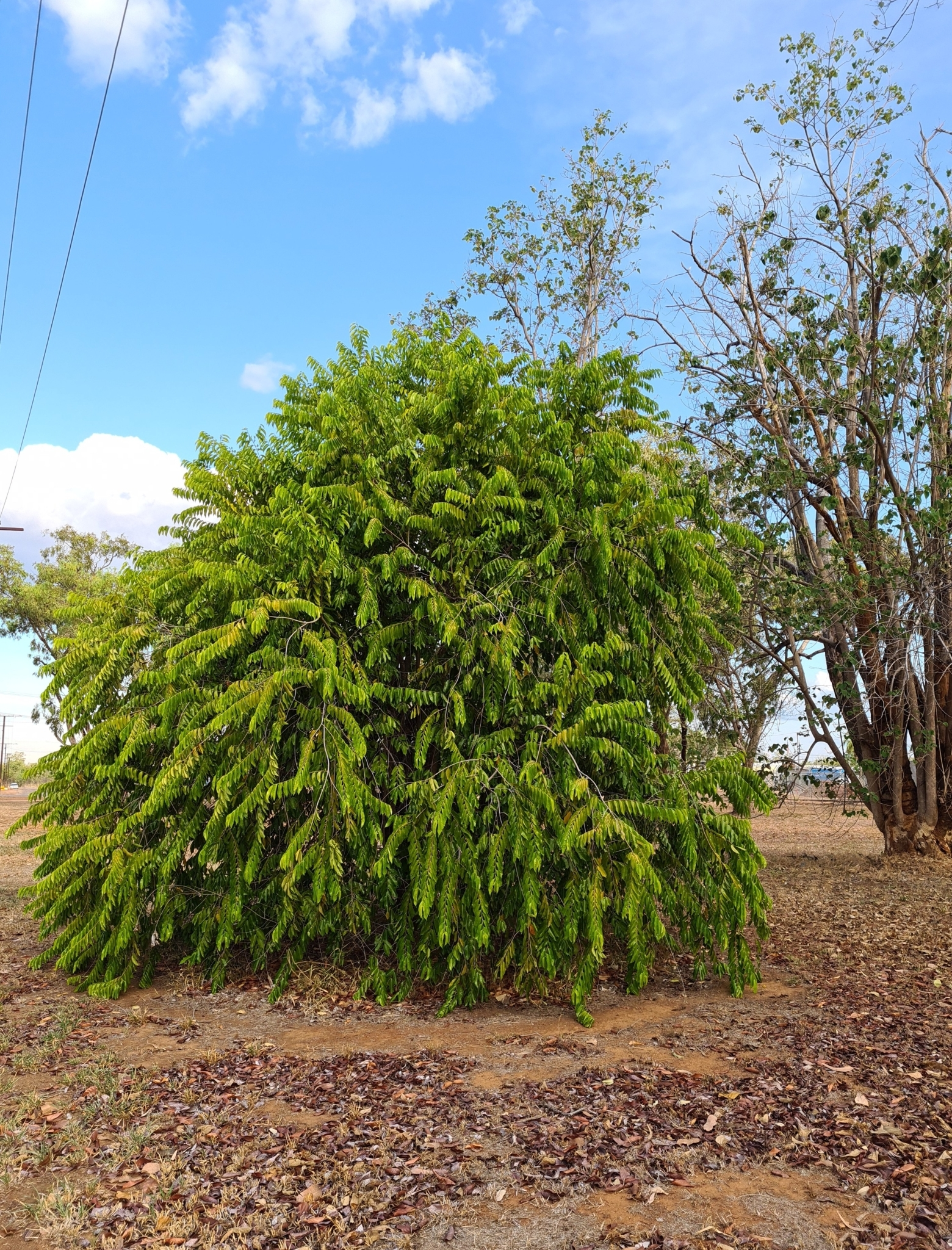

Conservation status
- Least Concern (IUCN 3.1)

Scientific classification
- Kingdom: Plantae
- Clade: Tracheophytes
- Clade: Angiosperms
- Clade: Eudicots
- Clade: Rosids
- Order: Malpighiales
- Family: Chrysobalanaceae
- Genus: Maranthes
- Species: M. corymbosa

Binomial name
- Maranthes corymbosa Blume

Synonyms
- List: Exitelia corymbosa (Blume) Blume; Exitelia multiflora (Korth.) Walp.; Ferolia corymbosa (Blume) Kuntze; Ferolia griffithiana (Benth.) Kuntze; Ferolia salicifolia (C.Presl) Kuntze; Grymania salicifolia C.Presl; Maranthes multiflora Korth.; Maranthes speciosa Miq.; Parinari corymbosa (Blume) Miq.; Parinari griffithiana Benth.; Parinari multiflora (Korth.) Miq.; Parinari palauensis Kaneh.; Parinari petiolata Malm; Parinari racemosa S.Vidal; Parinari salicifolia (C.Presl) Miq.; Petrocarya griffithiana (Benth.) Miers

= Maranthes corymbosa =

Species of tree

Maranthes corymbosa is a tree in the family Chrysobalanaceae. The specific epithet corymbosa is from the Greek meaning "cluster", referring to the clustered inflorescences.

== Description ==
Maranthes corymbosa grows up to 30 metres (100 ft) tall with a trunk diameter of up to 1.5 metres (5 ft). The smooth bark is grey-brown. The flowers are pink, tinged white. The edible fruits are ellipsoid and measure up to 4 cm (2 in) long. The wood is locally used in construction.

== Distribution and habitat ==
Maranthes corymbosa grows naturally in Thailand, Malesia, the Solomon Islands, the Caroline Islands and Australia. It is also found in Panama. Its habitat is forests from sea-level to 1,500 metres (5,000 ft) elevation.
