= Parastemon grandifructus =

Conservation status
- Vulnerable (IUCN 3.1)

Scientific classification
- Kingdom: Plantae
- Clade: Tracheophytes
- Clade: Angiosperms
- Clade: Eudicots
- Clade: Rosids
- Order: Malpighiales
- Family: Chrysobalanaceae
- Genus: Parastemon
- Species: P. grandifructus

Binomial name
- Parastemon grandifructus Prance

Species of tree

Parastemon grandifructus is a tree in the family Chrysobalanaceae. The specific epithet grandifructus is from the Latin meaning 'large fruit'.

== Description ==
Parastemon grandifructus grows up to 30 metres (100 ft) tall with a trunk diameter of up to 30 centimetres (10 in). The ellipsoid fruits measure up to 3.5 cm (1 in) long.

== Distribution and habitat ==
Parastemon grandifructus is endemic to Malaysian Borneo. Its habitat is lowland forests, including swamps, from sea-level to 150 metres (500 ft) elevation.
