= Hymenopus conferruminatus =

Conservation status
- Vulnerable (IUCN 2.3)

Scientific classification
- Kingdom: Plantae
- Clade: Embryophytes
- Clade: Tracheophytes
- Clade: Angiosperms
- Clade: Eudicots
- Clade: Rosids
- Order: Malpighiales
- Family: Chrysobalanaceae
- Genus: Hymenopus
- Species: H. conferruminatus

Binomial name
- Hymenopus conferruminatus (Prance) Sothers & Prance

Synonyms
- Licania conferruminata Prance

Species of flowering plant

Hymenopus conferruminatus is a species of plant in the family Chrysobalanaceae. It is endemic to Brazil.
