= Acioa longipendula =

Conservation status
- Least Concern (IUCN 3.1)

Scientific classification
- Kingdom: Plantae
- Clade: Tracheophytes
- Clade: Angiosperms
- Clade: Eudicots
- Clade: Rosids
- Order: Malpighiales
- Family: Chrysobalanaceae
- Genus: Acioa
- Species: A. longipendula

Binomial name
- Acioa longipendula (Pilg.) Sothers & Prance

Synonyms
- Couepia longipendula Pilg.

Species of tree

The tropical rainforest tree Acioa longipendula is known by the common names egg nut, castanha de galinha, and pendula nut. It is endemic to the Amazon Rainforest of northern Brazil.

Its nuts are used as a food source in rural South America, especially in Brazil. The nuts are useful for their oil.
