= Kostermanthus malayanus =

Conservation status
- Data Deficient (IUCN 3.1)

Scientific classification
- Kingdom: Plantae
- Clade: Embryophytes
- Clade: Tracheophytes
- Clade: Spermatophytes
- Clade: Angiosperms
- Clade: Eudicots
- Clade: Rosids
- Order: Malpighiales
- Family: Chrysobalanaceae
- Genus: Kostermanthus
- Species: K. malayanus

Binomial name
- Kostermanthus malayanus (Kosterm.) Prance

Synonyms
- Acioa malayana Kosterm.

Species of flowering plant

Kostermanthus malayanus is a species of plant in the family Chrysobalanaceae. It is endemic to Peninsular Malaysia. It is threatened by habitat loss.

== Distribution and habitat ==
K. malayanus is known only from the type locality on Mount Bintang, near the border of the states of Kedah and Perak in western Malaysia.
