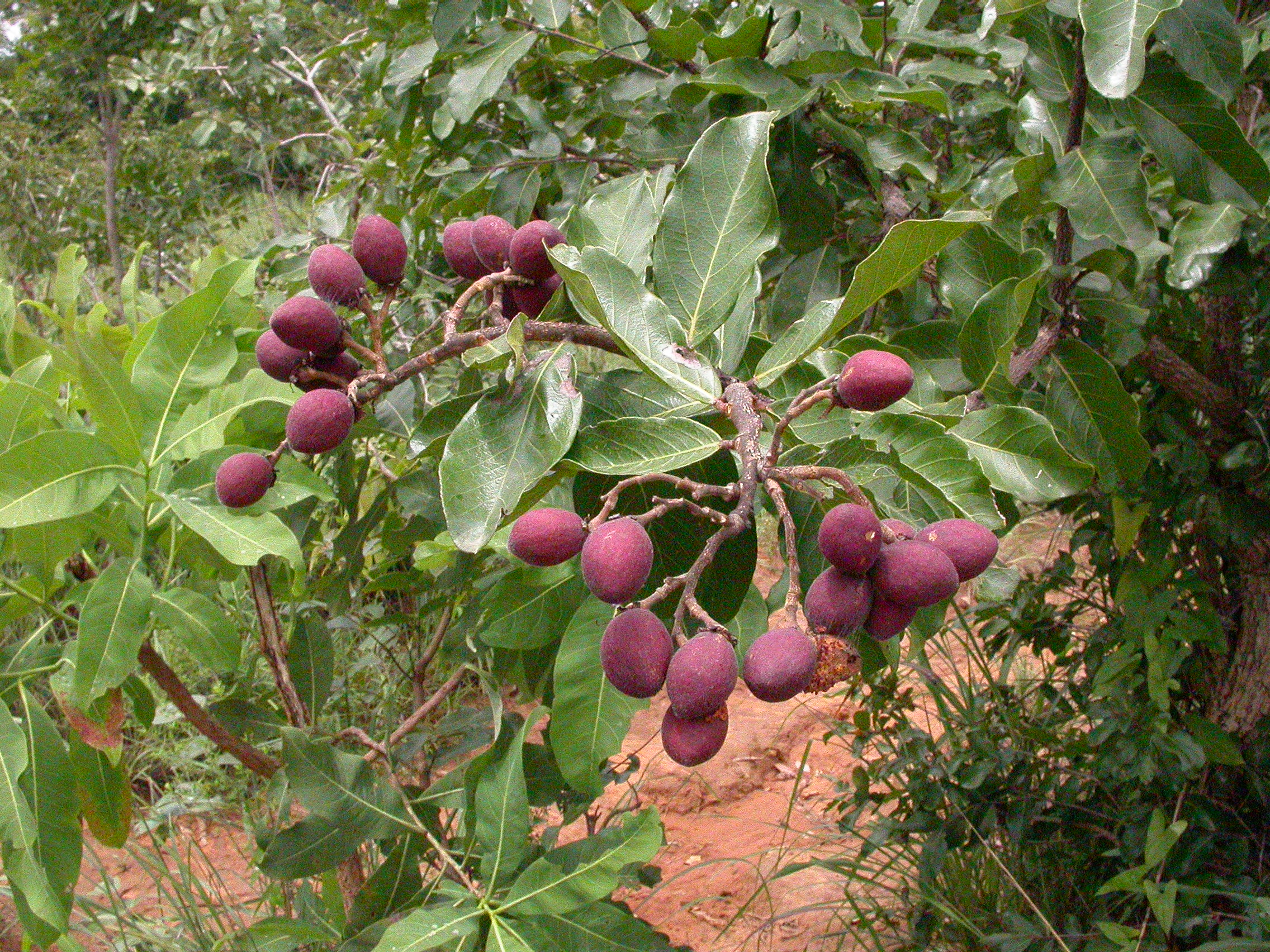
- Maranthes polyandra

Scientific classification
- Kingdom: Plantae
- Clade: Tracheophytes
- Clade: Angiosperms
- Clade: Eudicots
- Clade: Rosids
- Order: Malpighiales
- Family: Chrysobalanaceae
- Genus: Maranthes; Blume

Synonyms
- Exitelia Blume; Grymania C.Presl

= Maranthes =

Genus of flowering plants

Maranthes is a genus of plant in the family Chrysobalanaceae described as a genus in 1825.

Maranthes is native to tropical regions of Africa, Southeast Asia, Australia, Central America, and various oceanic islands.

Species

1. Maranthes aubrevillei (Pellegr.) Prance ex F.White - W Africa
2. Maranthes chrysophylla (Oliv.) Prance ex F.White - W + C Africa
3. Maranthes corymbosa Blume - Malaysia, Indonesia, Thailand, Papuasia, Philippines, Palau
4. Maranthes floribunda (Baker) F.White - C Africa
5. Maranthes gabunensis (Engl.) Prance - C Africa
6. Maranthes glabra (Oliv.) Prance - W + C Africa
7. Maranthes goetzeniana (Engl.) Prance - Tanzania, Mozambique, Zimbabwe
8. Maranthes kerstingii (Engl.) Prance ex F.White - W + C Africa
9. Maranthes panamensis (Standl.) Prance & F.White - Nicaragua, Costa Rica, Panama
10. Maranthes polyandra (Benth.) Prance - from Ivory Coast to South Sudan
11. Maranthes robusta (Oliv.) Prance ex F.White - W Africa
12. Maranthes sanagensis F.White - Cameroon
