= Kostermanthus =

Scientific classification
- Kingdom: Plantae
- Clade: Tracheophytes
- Clade: Angiosperms
- Clade: Eudicots
- Clade: Rosids
- Order: Malpighiales
- Family: Chrysobalanaceae
- Genus: Kostermanthus; Prance

Type species
- Kostermanthus heteropetalus (Scort. ex King) Prance

Species
- Kostermanthus heteropetalus (Scort. ex King) Prance; Kostermanthus malayanus (Kosterm.) Prance; Kostermanthus robustus Prance

Genus of plants

Kostermanthus is a genus of plants in the family Chrysobalanaceae described by British botanist Ghillean Prance in 1979. Species in this genus are large trees native to Malesia.

== Description ==
Plants in this genus are large trees with hairless leaves. The inflorescences are unbranched or minimally branched racemes, with hermaphroditic and strongly zygomorphic flowers. The fruits are hard drupes.

== Species ==
This genus includes the following species:

- Kostermanthus heteropetalus Scort. ex King Prance – Peninsular Malaysia, Borneo, Sumatra, Sulawesi, Philippines
- Kostermanthus malayanus (Kosterm.) Prance – Peninsular Malaysia
- Kostermanthus robustus Prance – Borneo
