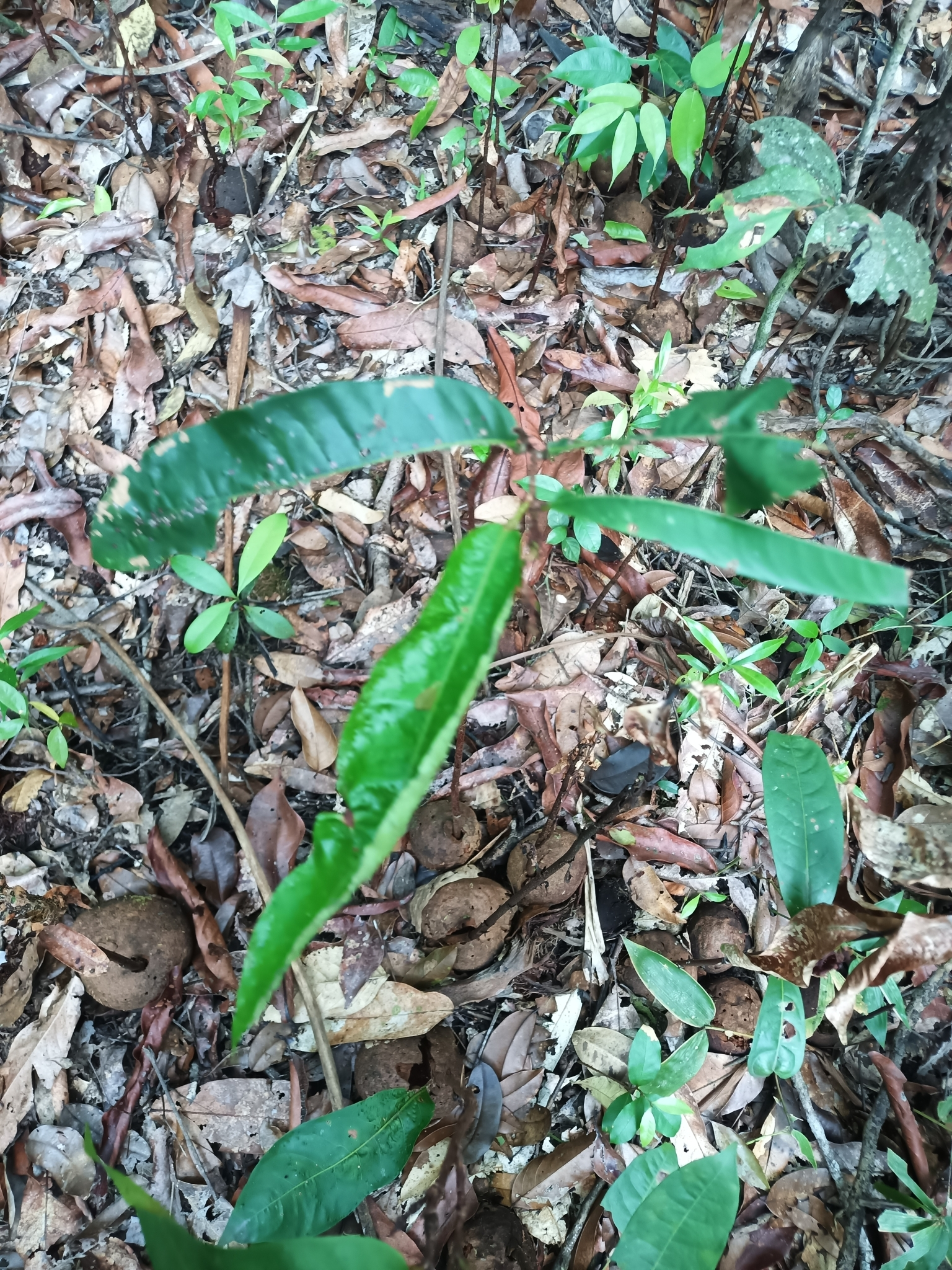
- Hymenopus macrophyllus

Scientific classification
- Kingdom: Plantae
- Clade: Tracheophytes
- Clade: Angiosperms
- Clade: Eudicots
- Clade: Rosids
- Order: Malpighiales
- Family: Chrysobalanaceae
- Genus: Hymenopus (Benth.) Sothers & Prance

Species
- See text

= Hymenopus (plant) =

Genus of plant

Hymenopus is a genus of plants in the family Chrysobalanaceae, native to Central and South America.

== Taxonomy ==
Species in Hymenopus were formerly placed in the genus Licania. As of July 2024, Plants of the World Online accepted the following species:

- Hymenopus adolphoduckei (Prance) Sothers & Prance
- Hymenopus amapaensis (Prance) Sothers & Prance
- Hymenopus arachicarpa (N.Zamora) Sothers & Prance
- Hymenopus arachnoideus (Fanshawe & Maguire) Sothers & Prance
- Hymenopus caudatus (Prance) Sothers & Prance
- Hymenopus conferruminatus (Prance) Sothers & Prance
- Hymenopus costaricensis (Standl. & Steyerm.) Sothers & Prance
- Hymenopus divaricatus (Benth.) Sothers & Prance
- Hymenopus glabriflorus (Prance) Sothers & Prance
- Hymenopus heteromorphus (Benth.) Sothers & Prance
- Hymenopus hirsutus (Prance) Sothers & Prance
- Hymenopus hispidus (Prance) Sothers & Prance
- Hymenopus intrapetiolaris (Spreng. ex Hook.f.) Sothers & Prance
- Hymenopus krukovii (Standl.) Sothers & Prance
- Hymenopus laevigatus (Prance) Sothers & Prance
- Hymenopus lasseri (Maguire) Sothers & Prance
- Hymenopus latifolius (Benth. ex Hook.f.) Sothers & Prance
- Hymenopus latistipulus (Prance) Sothers & Prance
- Hymenopus macrophyllus (Benth.) Sothers & Prance
- Hymenopus miltonii (Prance) Sothers & Prance
- Hymenopus minusculus (Cuatrec.) Sothers & Prance
- Hymenopus oblongifolius (Standl.) Sothers & Prance
- Hymenopus occultans (Prance) Sothers & Prance
- Hymenopus operculipetalus (Standl. & L.O.Williams) Sothers & Prance
- Hymenopus pakaraimensis (Prance) Sothers & Prance
- Hymenopus prismatocarpus (Spruce ex Hook.f.) Sothers & Prance
- Hymenopus reticulatus (Prance) Sothers & Prance
- Hymenopus sothersiae (Prance) Sothers & Prance
