= Licania velutina =

Conservation status
- Near Threatened (IUCN 3.1)

Scientific classification
- Kingdom: Plantae
- Clade: Tracheophytes
- Clade: Angiosperms
- Clade: Eudicots
- Clade: Rosids
- Order: Malpighiales
- Family: Chrysobalanaceae
- Genus: Licania
- Species: L. velutina

Binomial name
- Licania velutina Prance

Species of flowering plant

Licania velutina is a species of plant in the family Chrysobalanaceae. It is endemic to Ecuador. Its natural habitat is subtropical or tropical moist lowland forests.
