= Hunga =

Scientific classification
- Kingdom: Plantae
- Clade: Tracheophytes
- Clade: Angiosperms
- Clade: Eudicots
- Clade: Rosids
- Order: Malpighiales
- Family: Chrysobalanaceae
- Genus: Hunga; Prance

Type species
- Hunga rhamnoides (Guillaumin) Prance

Genus of plants

Hunga is a genus of plants in the family Chrysobalanaceae described by British botanist Ghillean Prance in 1979. Species in this genus are native to New Guinea and New Caledonia.

== Species ==
This genus includes the following species:

- Hunga cordata Prance – New Caledonia
- Hunga gerontogea (Schltr.) Prance – New Caledonia
- Hunga guillauminii Prance – New Caledonia
- Hunga lifouana (Däniker) Prance – New Caledonia, Loyalty Islands
- Hunga longifolia Prance – Papua New Guinea
- Hunga mackeeana Prance – New Caledonia
- Hunga minutiflora (Baker f.) Prance – New Caledonia
- Hunga myrsinoides (Schltr.) Prance – New Caledonia
- Hunga novoguineensis Prance – Papua New Guinea
- Hunga papuana (Baker f.) Prance – Papua New Guinea
- Hunga rhamnoides (Guillaumin) Prance – New Caledonia
