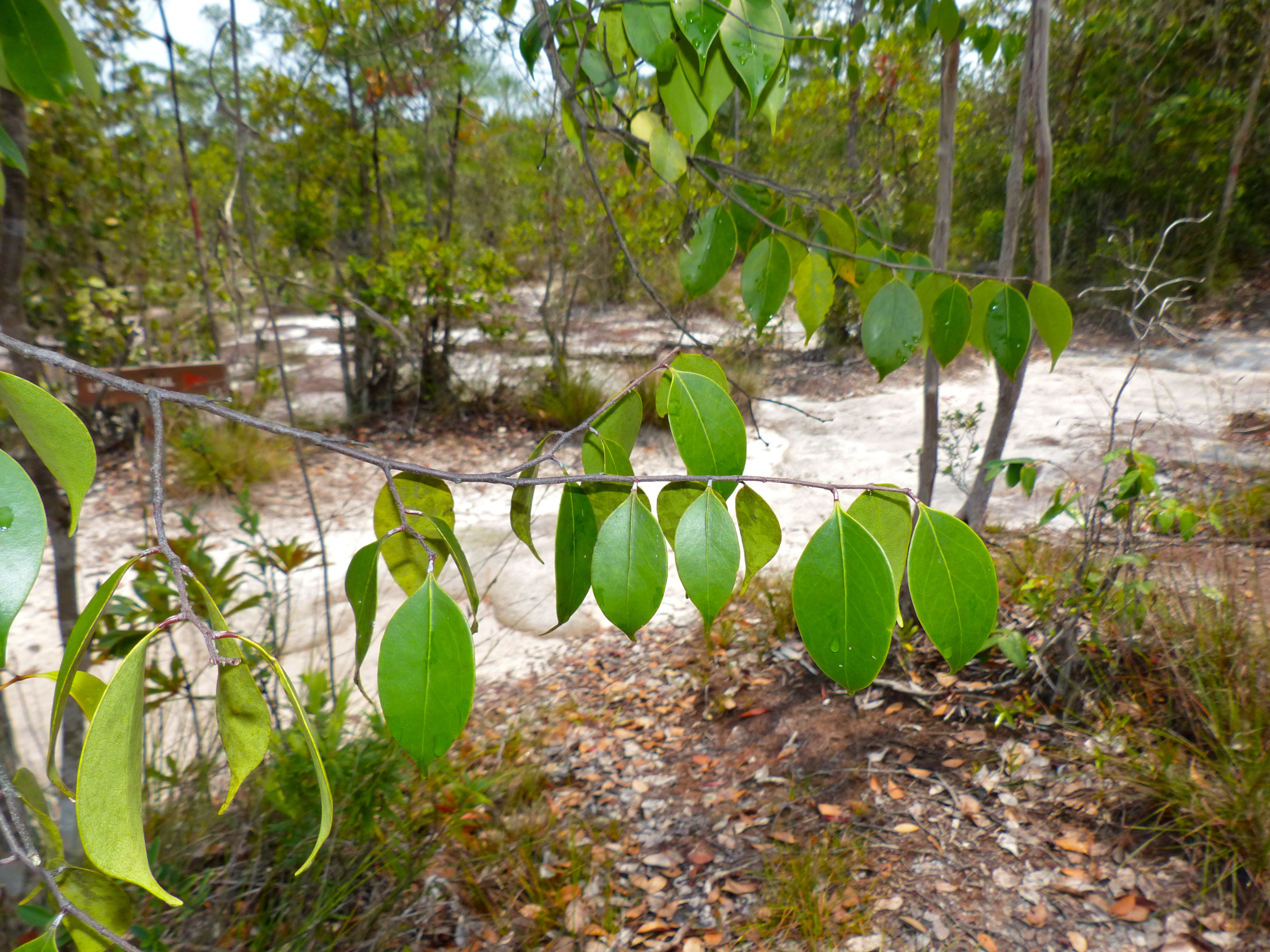
- Parastemon urophyllus

Scientific classification
- Kingdom: Plantae
- Clade: Tracheophytes
- Clade: Angiosperms
- Clade: Eudicots
- Clade: Rosids
- Order: Malpighiales
- Family: Chrysobalanaceae
- Genus: Parastemon; A.DC.

Synonyms
- Diemenia Korth.

= Parastemon =

Genus of flowering plants

Parastemon is a genus of plant in the family Chrysobalanaceae described as a genus in 1842. It is native to Southeast Asia and to Papuasia.

Species

1. Parastemon grandifructus Prance - Sarawak, Sabah
2. Parastemon urophyllus (Wall. ex A.DC.) A.DC. - Nicobar Islands, Thailand, Peninsular Malaysia, Borneo, Sumatra
3. Parastemon versteeghii Merr. & L.M.Perry - Sulawesi, Maluku, New Guinea, Admiralty Islands
