= Bafodeya =

Conservation status
- Vulnerable (IUCN 3.1)

Scientific classification
- Kingdom: Plantae
- Clade: Tracheophytes
- Clade: Angiosperms
- Clade: Eudicots
- Clade: Rosids
- Order: Malpighiales
- Family: Chrysobalanaceae
- Genus: Bafodeya; Prance ex F.White
- Species: B. benna

Binomial name
- Bafodeya benna (Scott-Elliot) Prance ex F.White

Synonyms
- Parinari benna Scott-Elliot

Genus of plants

Bafodeya is a genus of plants in the family Chrysobalanaceae described in 1976.

There is only one known species, Bafodeya benna, native to tropical West Africa (Mali, Guinea, Sierra Leone).

The species is listed as vulnerable.
