= Magnistipula =

Scientific classification
- Kingdom: Plantae
- Clade: Tracheophytes
- Clade: Angiosperms
- Clade: Eudicots
- Clade: Rosids
- Order: Malpighiales
- Family: Chrysobalanaceae
- Genus: Magnistipula; Engl.

Genus of flowering plants

Magnistipula is a genus of plant in family Chrysobalanaceae described as a genus in 1905.

Magnistipula is native to tropical Africa and Madagascar.

Species

1. Magnistipula bimarsupiata Letouzey - Gabon
2. Magnistipula butayei De Wild. - from Liberia to Malawi
3. Magnistipula cerebriformis (Capuron) F.White - Madagascar
4. Magnistipula conrauana Engl. - Cameroon
5. Magnistipula cuneatifolia Haum. - Cameroon, Gabon
6. Magnistipula cupheiflora Mildbr. - Cameroon, Gabon, Sierra Leone
7. Magnistipula devriesii Breteler - Gabon
8. Magnistipula glaberrima Engl. - Cameroon, Gabon
9. Magnistipula multinervia Burgt - Cameroon
10. Magnistipula sapinii De Wild. - Katanga, Angola, Zambia
11. Magnistipula tamenaka (Capuron) F.White - Madagascar
12. Magnistipula tessmannii (Engl.) Prance - from Nigeria to Zaire
13. Magnistipula zenkeri Engl. - from Guinea to Equatorial Guinea
