= Exellodendron =

Scientific classification
- Kingdom: Plantae
- Clade: Tracheophytes
- Clade: Angiosperms
- Clade: Eudicots
- Clade: Rosids
- Order: Malpighiales
- Family: Chrysobalanaceae
- Genus: Exellodendron; Prance

Genus of plants

Exellodendron is a genus of plant in the family Chrysobalanaceae described as a genus in 1972.

The entire genus Exellodendron is native to South America.

Species

1. Exellodendron barbatum (Ducke) Prance - Bolívar, Guyana, Suriname, French Guiana, Brazil (Amazonas, Maranhão, Pará)
2. Exellodendron cordatum (Hook.f.) Prance - NE Brazil
3. Exellodendron coriaceum (Benth.) Prance - Venezuela (Amazonas, Bolívar), Guyana, Brazil (Amazonas, Roraima, Pará)
4. Exellodendron gardneri (Hook.f.) Prance - Brazil (Rondônia, Bahia, Goiás)
5. Exellodendron gracile (Kuhlm.) Prance - Brazil (Espírito Santo)
