= Leptobalanus =

Scientific classification
- Kingdom: Plantae
- Clade: Tracheophytes
- Clade: Angiosperms
- Clade: Eudicots
- Clade: Rosids
- Order: Malpighiales
- Family: Chrysobalanaceae
- Genus: Leptobalanus (Benth.) Sothers & Prance

Genus of plants

Leptobalanus is a genus of flowering plants belonging to the family Chrysobalanaceae.

Its native range is Mexico to Southern Tropical America and Trinidad. Leptobalanus consists of species formerly placed in the genus Licania.

Species:

- Leptobalanus albiflorus (Fanshawe & Maguire) Sothers & Prance
- Leptobalanus apetalus (E.Mey.) Sothers & Prance
- Leptobalanus bullatus (Prance) Sothers & Prance
- Leptobalanus calvescens (Cuatrec.) Sothers & Prance
- Leptobalanus cardiophyllus (Prance) Sothers & Prance
- Leptobalanus cuatrecasasii (Prance) Sothers & Prance
- Leptobalanus cuspidatus (Rusby) Sothers & Prance
- Leptobalanus diegogomezii (Prance) Sothers & Prance
- Leptobalanus emarginatus (Spruce ex Hook.f.) Sothers & Prance
- Leptobalanus foveolatus (Prance) Sothers & Prance
- Leptobalanus fuchsii (Prance) Sothers & Prance
- Leptobalanus gardneri (Hook.f.) Sothers & Prance
- Leptobalanus granvillei (Prance) Sothers & Prance
- Leptobalanus humilis (Cham. & Schltdl.) Sothers & Prance
- Leptobalanus jefensis (Prance) Sothers & Prance
- Leptobalanus joseramosii (Prance) Sothers & Prance
- Leptobalanus latus (J.F.Macbr.) Sothers & Prance
- Leptobalanus longistylus (Hook.f.) Sothers & Prance
- Leptobalanus maguirei (Prance) Sothers & Prance
- Leptobalanus mexicanus (Lundell) Sothers & Prance
- Leptobalanus morii (Prance) Sothers & Prance
- Leptobalanus octandrus (Hoffmanns. ex Schult.) Sothers & Prance
- Leptobalanus parvifolius (Huber) Sothers & Prance
- Leptobalanus persaudii (Fanshawe & Maguire) Sothers & Prance
- Leptobalanus sclerophyllus (Mart. ex Hook.f.) Sothers & Prance
- Leptobalanus sparsipilis (S.F.Blake) Sothers & Prance
- Leptobalanus sprucei (Hook.f.) Sothers & Prance
- Leptobalanus stevensii (Prance) Sothers & Prance
- Leptobalanus turbinatus (Benth.) Sothers & Prance
- Leptobalanus undulatus (Prance) Sothers & Prance
- Leptobalanus wurdackii (Prance) Sothers & Prance
