= Acioa edulis =

Conservation status
- Least Concern (IUCN 3.1)

Scientific classification
- Kingdom: Plantae
- Clade: Tracheophytes
- Clade: Angiosperms
- Clade: Eudicots
- Clade: Rosids
- Order: Malpighiales
- Family: Chrysobalanaceae
- Genus: Acioa
- Species: A. edulis

Binomial name
- Acioa edulis Prance

Synonyms
- Couepia edulis (Prance) Prance

Species of tree

Acioa edulis, syn. Couepia edulis (Prance) Prance, is a fruit and timber tree in the family Chrysobalanaceae, which is native to the Amazon rainforest in Brazil. The tree's Portuguese common name is Castanha-de-cutia. The tree grows naturally only within a small area of Brazil; however, they proliferate widely within this area. The tree is around 25 m (82 ft) tall, with entire leaves that are oval or round, measuring 8–10 cm (3.1–3.9 in) diameter, with a petiole up to 2.5 cm (0.98 in) long. Its fruit ranges from 8–9 cm (3.1–3.5 in) long and 4–5 cm (1.6–2.0 in) diameter. and contain a single nut. Later these nuts float on the waters and have been collected for centuries as the source of a valuable oil, but their source was unknown until 1978 when botanical explorer Ghillean Prance discovered the species of tree which produces them.

== Cultivation ==
The fruit is edible or can be pressed to extract oil used in cooking or soap making. The kernel is also edible.

== See also ==
- List of plants of Amazon Rainforest vegetation of Brazil
