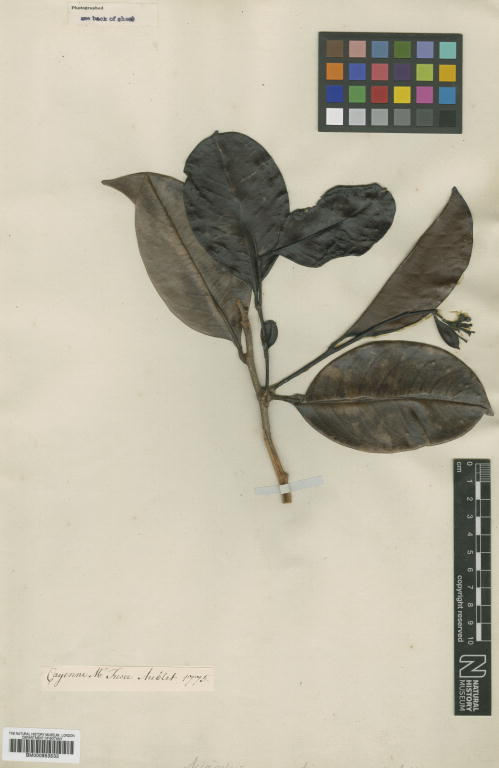
- A. guianensis

Scientific classification
- Kingdom: Plantae
- Clade: Embryophytes
- Clade: Tracheophytes
- Clade: Spermatophytes
- Clade: Angiosperms
- Clade: Eudicots
- Clade: Rosids
- Order: Malpighiales
- Family: Chrysobalanaceae
- Genus: Acioa; Aubl.

Type species
- Acioa guianensis Aubl.

= Acioa =

Genus of plants

Acioa is a genus of flowering plants in the family Chrysobalanaceae described as a genus in 1775. It is native to northeastern South America.

== Species ==
Six species are accepted.

- Acioa dolichopoda (Prance) Sothers & Prance
- Acioa edulis Prance – Amazonas in Brazil
- Acioa guianensis Aubl. – French Guiana, N Brazil
- Acioa longipendula (Pilg.) Sothers & Prance – northern Brazil
- Acioa schultesii Maguire – SE Colombia, S Venezuela, NW Brazil
- Acioa somnolens Maguire – French Guiana, N Brazil

=== Formerly placed here ===
- Dactyladenia barteri (Hook.f. ex Oliv.) Prance & F.White (as Acioa barteri (Hook.f. ex Oliv.) Engl.)
