= Angelesia =

Scientific classification
- Kingdom: Plantae
- Clade: Tracheophytes
- Clade: Angiosperms
- Clade: Eudicots
- Clade: Rosids
- Order: Malpighiales
- Family: Chrysobalanaceae
- Genus: Angelesia; Korth.

Genus of flowering plants

Angelesia is a genus of flowering plants belonging to the family Chrysobalanaceae.

Its native range is Thailand to New Guinea.

Species:

- Angelesia fusicarpa (Kosterm.) Sothers & Prance
- Angelesia palawanensis (Prance) Sothers & Prance
- Angelesia splendens Korth.
