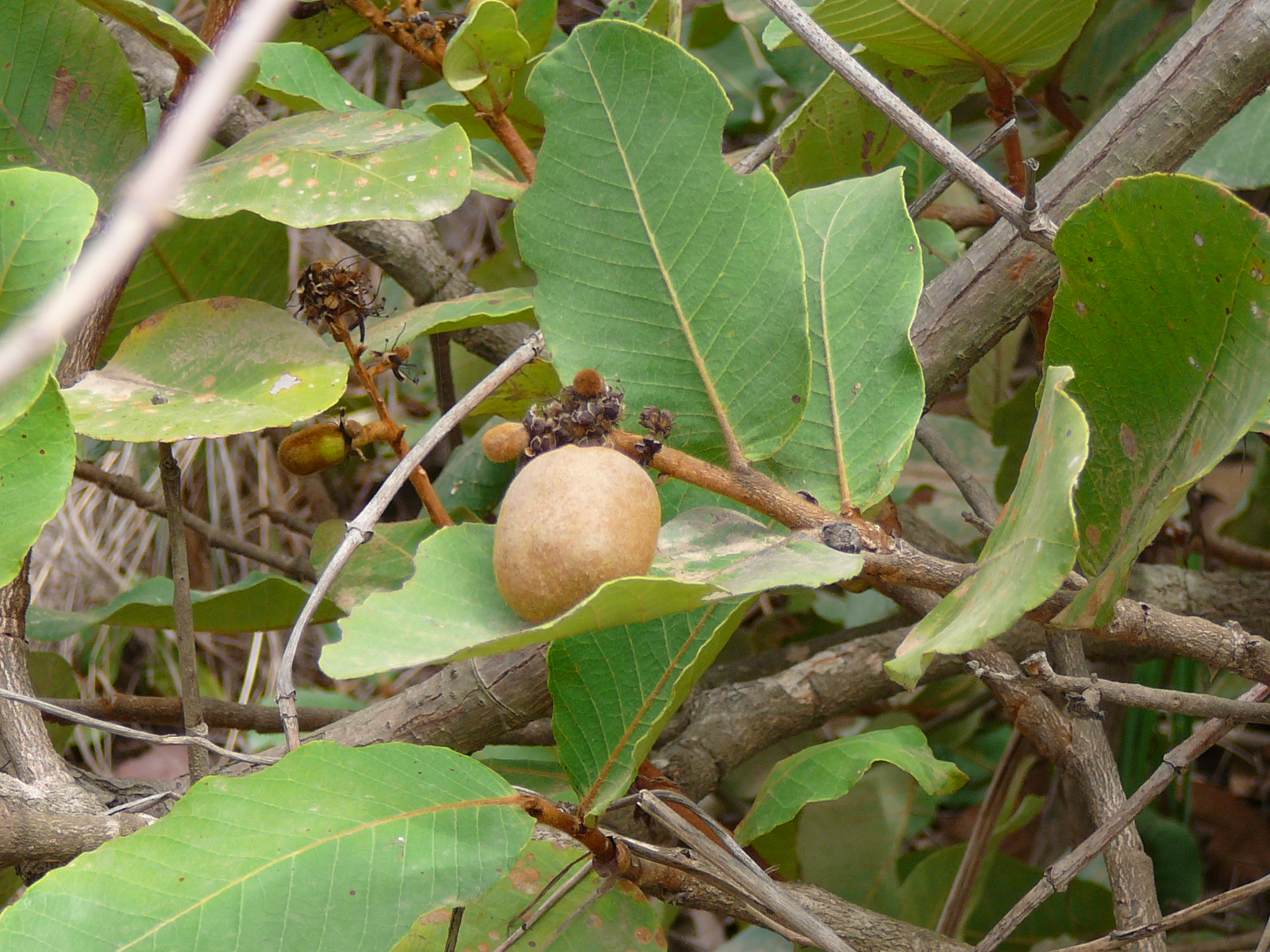

Scientific classification
- Kingdom: Plantae
- Clade: Tracheophytes
- Clade: Angiosperms
- Clade: Eudicots
- Clade: Rosids
- Order: Malpighiales
- Family: Chrysobalanaceae
- Genus: Neocarya (DC.) Prance ex F.White
- Species: N. macrophylla

Binomial name
- Neocarya macrophylla (Sabine) Prance ex F.White

Synonyms
- Parinari sect. Neocarya DC.; Parinari subgen. Neocarya (DC.) Blume ex Fürnr.; Parinari macrophylla Sabine; Petrocarya macrophylla (Sabine) Steud.; Ferolia macrophylla (Sabine) Kuntze; Parinari senegalensis Perr. ex DC.; Petrocarya senegalensis (Perr. ex DC.) Steud.

= Neocarya =

Genus of flowering plants

Neocarya is a genus of plant in family Chrysobalanaceae described as a genus in 1976.

It contains only one known species, Neocarya macrophylla, native to western and central Africa from Senegal to the Nigeria, and also in South Sudan. It is commonly known in English as the Gingerbread Plum, despite not being related to the true Plum (Prunus sp.).
