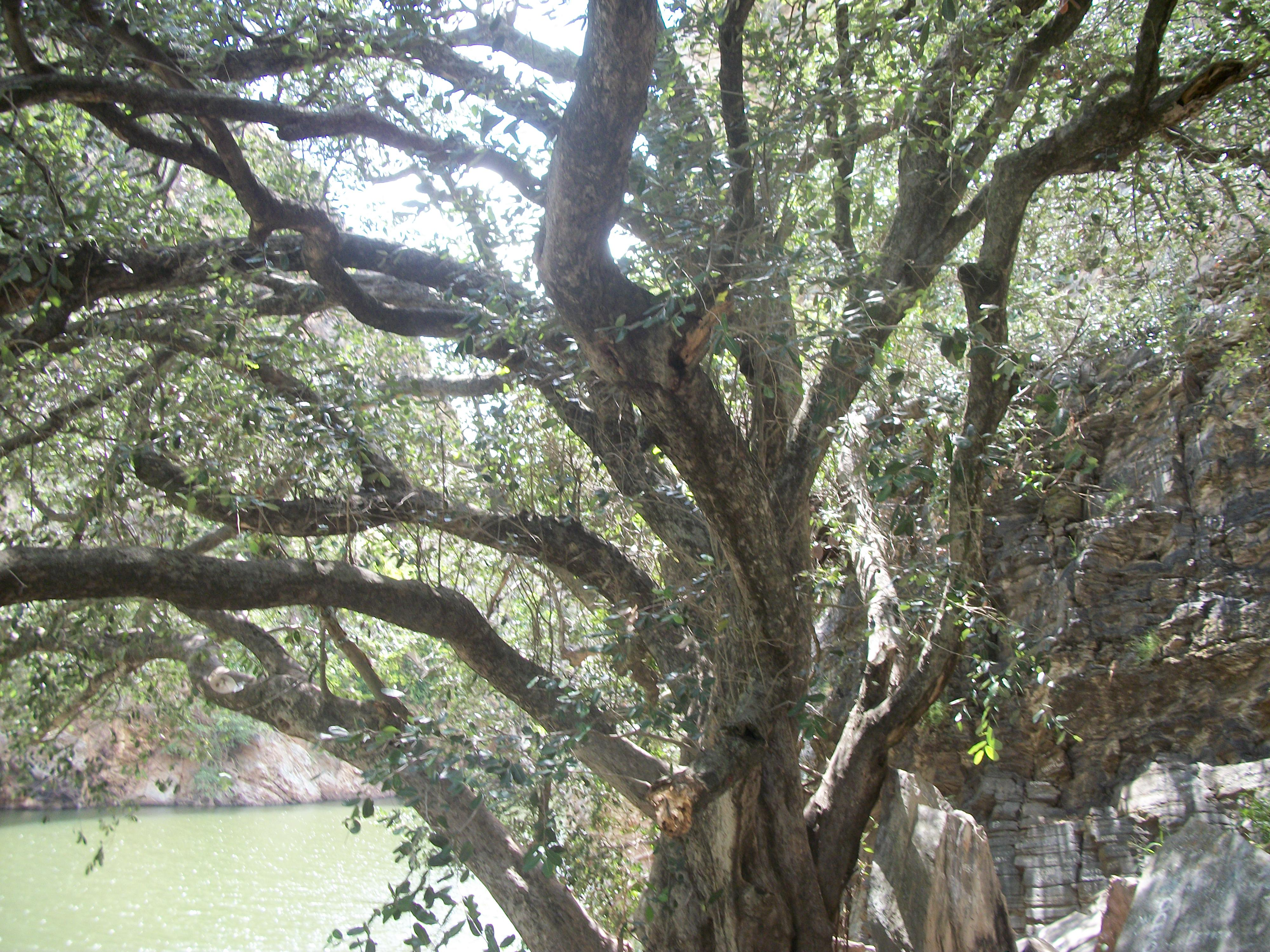
- Microdesmia rigida

Scientific classification
- Kingdom: Plantae
- Clade: Tracheophytes
- Clade: Angiosperms
- Clade: Eudicots
- Clade: Rosids
- Order: Malpighiales
- Family: Chrysobalanaceae
- Genus: Microdesmia (Benth.) Sothers & Prance

= Microdesmia =

Genus of plants

Microdesmia is a genus of flowering plants belonging to the family Chrysobalanaceae.

Its native range is Mexico to Southern Tropical America. Microdesmia consists of species formerly placed in the genus Licania.

Species:

- Microdesmia arborea (Seem.) Sothers & Prance
- Microdesmia rigida (Benth.) Sothers & Prance
