= Afrolicania =

Conservation status
- Least Concern (IUCN 3.1)

Scientific classification
- Kingdom: Plantae
- Clade: Tracheophytes
- Clade: Angiosperms
- Clade: Eudicots
- Clade: Rosids
- Order: Malpighiales
- Family: Chrysobalanaceae
- Genus: Afrolicania; Mildbr.
- Species: A. elaeosperma

Binomial name
- Afrolicania elaeosperma Mildbr.

Synonyms
- Licania elaeosperma (Mildbr.) Prance & F.White

Genus of flowering plants

Afrolicania is a genus of plant in family Chrysobalanaceae described as a genus in 1921. It contains only one known species, Afrolicania elaeosperma, native to western and central Africa from Liberia to the Republic of the Congo.
