= Gaulettia =

Scientific classification
- Kingdom: Plantae
- Clade: Tracheophytes
- Clade: Angiosperms
- Clade: Eudicots
- Clade: Rosids
- Order: Malpighiales
- Family: Chrysobalanaceae
- Genus: Gaulettia; Sothers & Prance

Genus of flowering plants

Gaulettia is a genus of flowering plants belonging to the family Chrysobalanaceae.

Its native range is Southern Tropical America.

Species:

- Gaulettia amaraliae (Prance) Sothers & Prance
- Gaulettia canescens (Gleason) Sothers & Prance
- Gaulettia canomensis (Mart.) Sothers & Prance
- Gaulettia cognata (Steud.) Sothers & Prance
- Gaulettia elata (Ducke) Sothers & Prance
- Gaulettia foveolata (Prance) Sothers & Prance
- Gaulettia parillo (DC.) Sothers & Prance
- Gaulettia racemosa (Benth. ex Hook.f.) Sothers & Prance
- Gaulettia steyermarkii (Maguire) Sothers & Prance
