= Licania caldasiana =

Conservation status
- Data Deficient (IUCN 3.1)

Scientific classification
- Kingdom: Plantae
- Clade: Tracheophytes
- Clade: Angiosperms
- Clade: Eudicots
- Clade: Rosids
- Order: Malpighiales
- Family: Chrysobalanaceae
- Genus: Licania
- Species: L. caldasiana

Binomial name
- Licania caldasiana Cuatrec.

Species of tree

Licania caldasiana is a species of tree in the family Chrysobalanaceae. It was endemic to Colombia. This mostly neotropical family has over 500 species, over 100 of them in the genus Licania alone. The species is only known from its type locality, it was collected by Mutis in the 18th century, who left no detailed notes about the location site or date.
