= Cordillera platycalyx =

Conservation status
- Least Concern (IUCN 3.1)

Scientific classification
- Kingdom: Plantae
- Clade: Tracheophytes
- Clade: Angiosperms
- Clade: Eudicots
- Clade: Rosids
- Order: Malpighiales
- Family: Chrysobalanaceae
- Genus: Cordillera; Sothers & Prance
- Species: C. platycalyx

Binomial name
- Cordillera platycalyx (Cuatrec.) Sothers & Prance

Synonyms
- Couepia platycalyx Cuatrec.; Licania platycalyx (Cuatrec.) Sothers & Prance

Species of flowering plant

Cordillera platycalyx is a species of flowering plant in the family Chrysobalanaceae, and the sole species in genus Cordillera. It is a tree native to Costa Rica, Colombia, Venezuela, and Ecuador. It is a large tree which grows 25 to 35 meters tall, flowers in March, and fruits in March and October. It grows in lowland tropical rain forest and wet or pluvial submontane and montane rain forest from 250 to 2,725 meters elevation.

The species was first described as Couepia platycalyx by José Cuatrecasas in 1950. In 2016 Sothers & Prance placed it in the newly described genus Cordillera as C. platycalyx.
