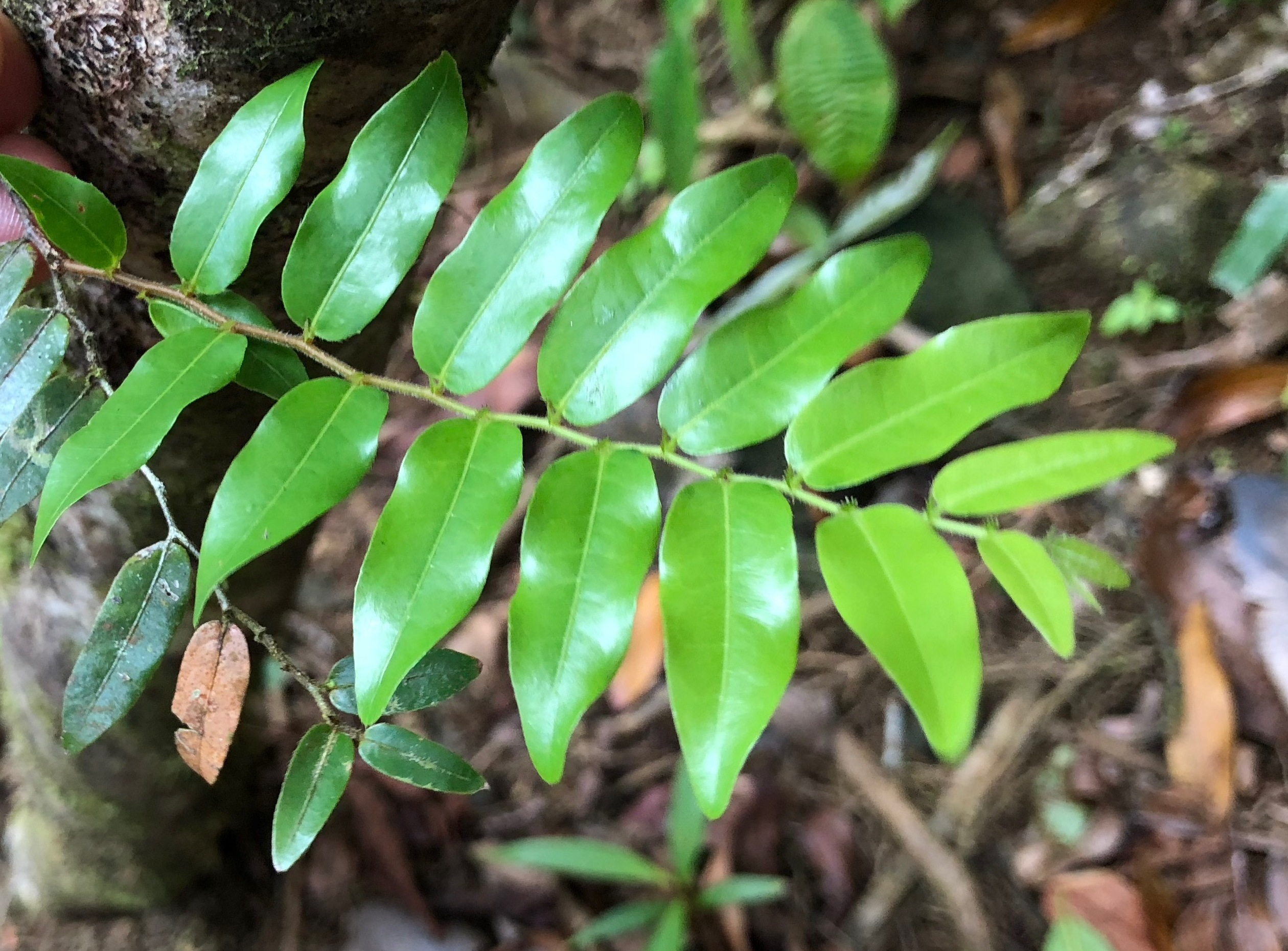
- Grangeria borbonica

Scientific classification
- Kingdom: Plantae
- Clade: Tracheophytes
- Clade: Angiosperms
- Clade: Eudicots
- Clade: Rosids
- Order: Malpighiales
- Family: Chrysobalanaceae
- Genus: Grangeria; Comm. ex Juss.

= Grangeria =

Genus of plants

Grangeria is a genus of plant in the family Chrysobalanaceae described as a genus in 1789.

Grangeria is native to certain islands in the Indian Ocean: Madagascar, Mauritius, and Réunion.

Species

1. Grangeria borbonica Lam. - Mauritius, Réunion
2. Grangeria porosa Boivin ex Baill. - Madagascar

Formerly included

Grangeria brasiliensis Hoffmanns. ex Mart. & Zucc - Hirtella ciliata Mart. & Zucc. - South America
