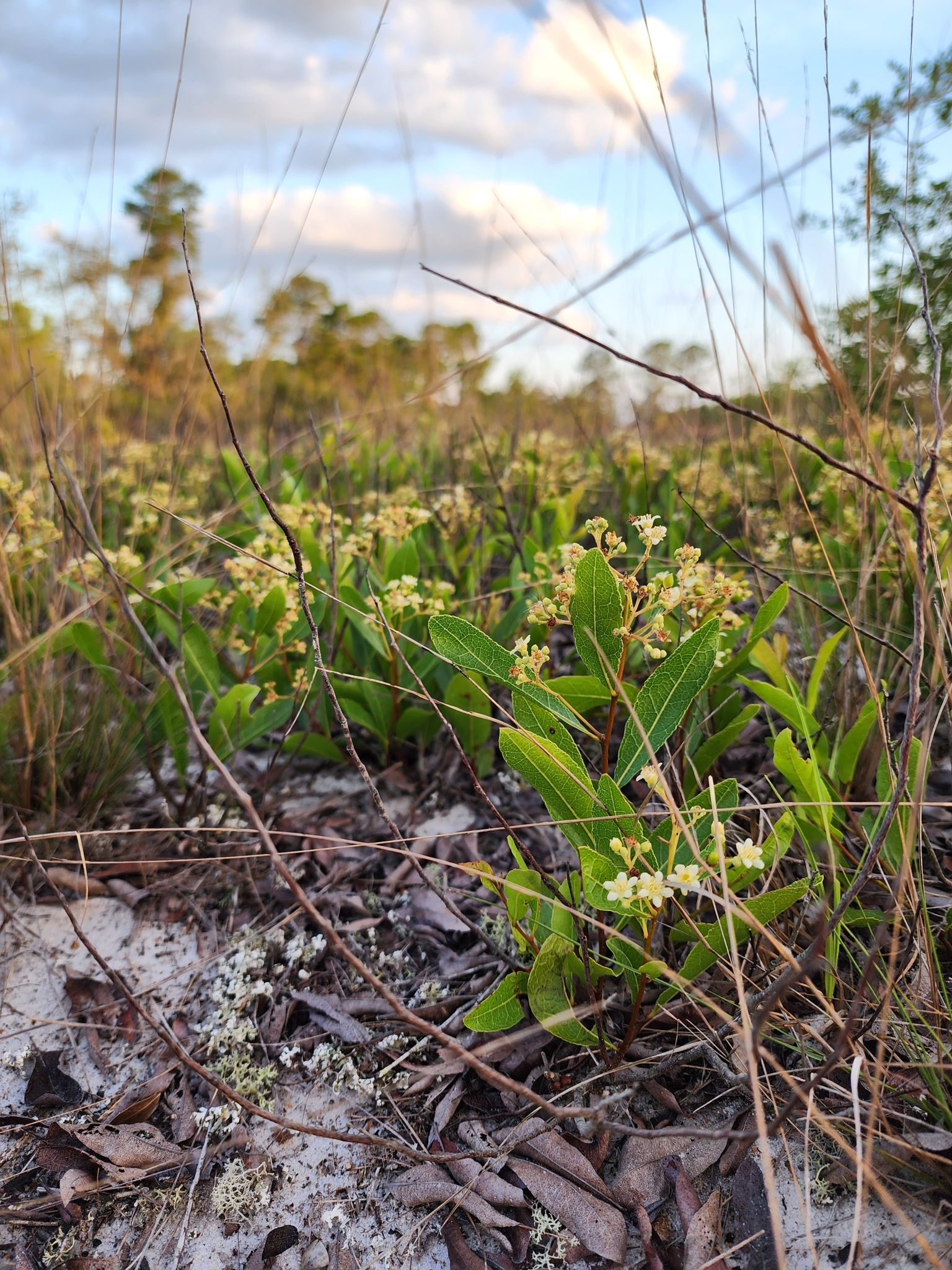
- Geobalanus oblongifolius

Scientific classification
- Kingdom: Plantae
- Clade: Tracheophytes
- Clade: Angiosperms
- Clade: Eudicots
- Clade: Rosids
- Order: Malpighiales
- Family: Chrysobalanaceae
- Genus: Geobalanus; Small

= Geobalanus =

Genus of plants

Geobalanus is a genus of flowering plants belonging to the family Chrysobalanaceae.

Its native range is the southeastern USA, Western Mexico to Central America.

Species:

- Geobalanus oblongifolius (Michx.) Small
- Geobalanus retifolius (S.F.Blake) Sothers & Prance
- Geobalanus riverae (Prance) Sothers & Prance
