= Parinariopsis =

Conservation status
- Least Concern (IUCN 3.1)

Scientific classification
- Kingdom: Plantae
- Clade: Tracheophytes
- Clade: Angiosperms
- Clade: Eudicots
- Clade: Rosids
- Order: Malpighiales
- Family: Chrysobalanaceae
- Genus: Parinariopsis (Huber) Sothers & Prance
- Species: P. licaniiflora

Binomial name
- Parinariopsis licaniiflora (Sagot) Sothers & Prance

Synonyms
- Licania bracteosa Fritsch; Licania capinensis Huber; Licania huberiana Maguire; Licania licaniiflora (Sagot) S.F.Blake; Licania obovatifolia Maguire; Licania obtusifolia Fritsch; Licania parinarioides Huber; Licania parinarioides var. latifolia Maguire; Licania parviflora (Blume) Lemée; Licania wilson-brownei Maguire; Moquilea licaniiflora Sagot; Moquilea parviflora Blume

Genus of plants

Parinariopsis is a monotypic genus of flowering plants belonging to the family Chrysobalanaceae. The only species is Parinariopsis licaniiflora. It is a tree native to northern Brazil, Colombia, the Guianas, Peru, and Venezuela in tropical South America.
