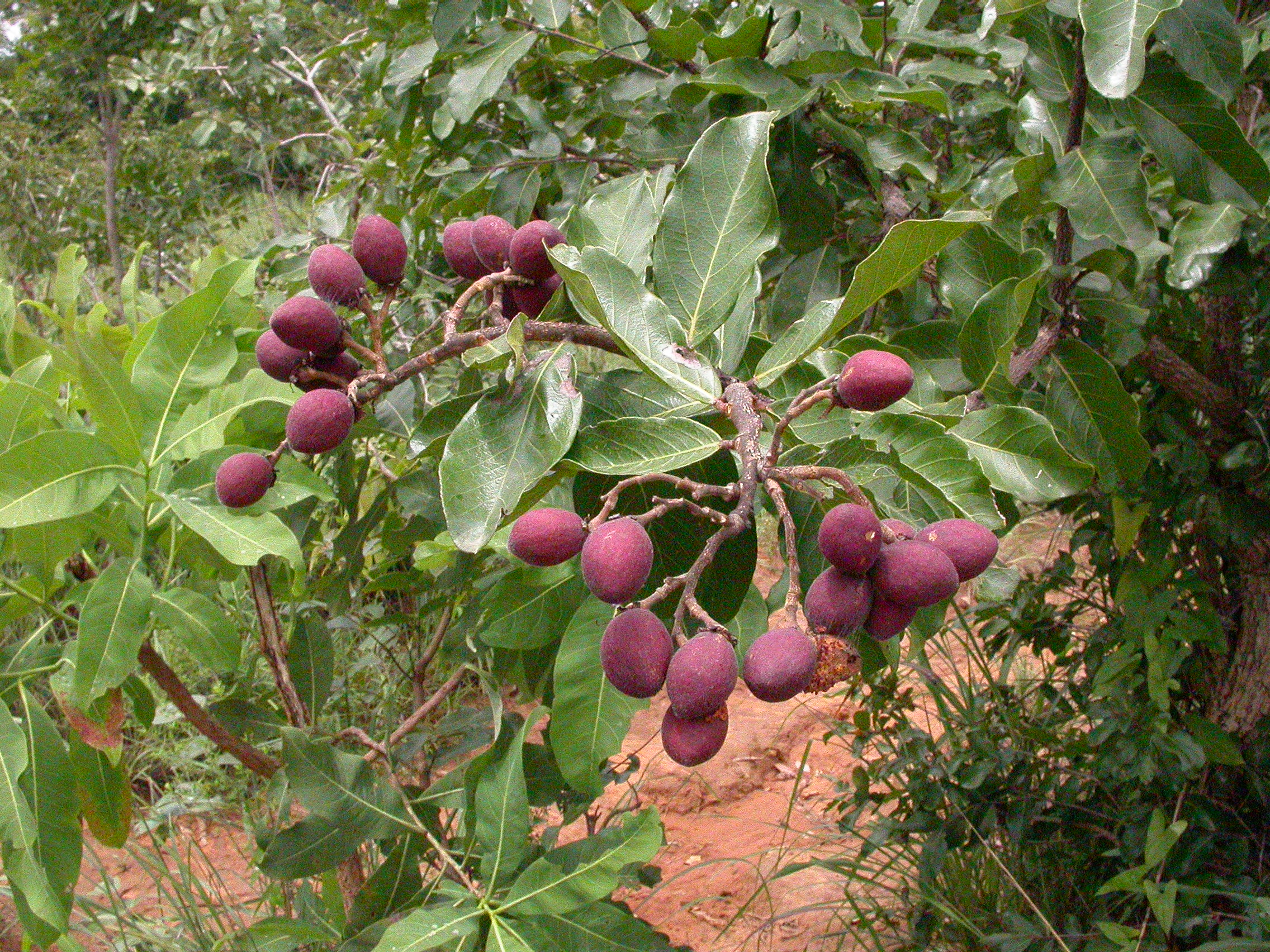
- Maranthes polyandra

Scientific classification
- Kingdom: Plantae
- Clade: Tracheophytes
- Clade: Angiosperms
- Clade: Eudicots
- Clade: Rosids
- Order: Malpighiales
- Family: Chrysobalanaceae; R.Br.

Genera
- See text.

= Chrysobalanaceae =

Family of flowering plants

Chrysobalanaceae is a family of flowering plants, consisting of trees and shrubs in 27 genera and about 700 species of pantropical distribution with a centre of diversity in the Amazon. Some of the species contain silica in their bodies for rigidity and so the mesophyll often has sclerenchymatous idioblasts. The widespread species Chrysobalanus icaco produces a plum-like fruit and the plant is commonly known as the coco plum.

The family was traditionally placed as subfamily Chrysobalanoideae in the rose family (Rosaceae) or as a family in the rose order and exceptionally as an order in Myrtiflorae by Dahlgren. In the phenotypic cladistic analysis of Nandi et al., it branched with Elaeagnaceae as sister group of Polygalaceae, in their molecular cladistic analysis it was in Malpighiales and also in their combined analysis.

== Genera ==
As of May 2026, Plants of the World Online accepted the following genera:

- Acioa Aubl.
- Afrolicania Mildbr.
- Angelesia Korth.
- Atuna Raf.
- Bafodeya Prance ex F.White
- Chrysobalanus L.
- Cordillera Sothers & Prance
- Couepia Aubl.
- Dactyladenia Welw.
- Exellodendron Prance
- Gaulettia Sothers & Prance
- Geobalanus Small
- Grangeria Comm. ex Juss.
- Hirtella L.
- Hunga Prance
- Hymenopus (Benth.) Sothers & Prance
- Kostermanthus Prance
- Leptobalanus (Benth.) Sothers & Prance
- Licania Aubl.
- Magnistipula Engl.
- Maranthes Blume
- Microdesmia (Benth.) Sothers & Prance
- Moquilea Aubl.
- Neocarya (DC.) Prance ex F.White
- Parastemon A.DC.
- Parinari Aubl.
- Parinariopsis (Huber) Sothers & Prance
