= Zapote amarillo =

Zapote amarillo is a common name for three separate tree species native to Central America:

- Couepia polyandra, also known as olosapo or baboon cap
- Licania platypus, also known as sansapote or sun sapote
- Pouteria campechiana, also known as canistel or cupcake fruit
