= Lekima =

Lekima may refer to:

- Typhoon Lekima, the name of four tropical cyclones in the Pacific Ocean
- A common name for Lucuma campechiana or Lucuma bifera, evergreen trees
