= Juan Domínguez (Colombian footballer) =

Colombian footballer (born 1986)

Juan Guillermo Domínguez
Personal information
- Full name: Juan Guillermo Domínguez Cabezas
- Date of birth: 17 December 1986 (age 39)
- Place of birth: El Cerrito, Colombia
- Height: 1.73 m (5 ft 8 in)
- Position: Left-back

Youth career
- 1997–2004: Deportivo Cali

Senior career*
Years	Team	Apps	(Gls)
2005–2010	Deportivo Cali	130	(13)
2005–2006	→ Real Cartagena (loan)	32	(1)
2011	Millonarios	20	(1)
2011–2012	Estudiantes LP	9	(0)
2012	→ Newell's Old Boys (loan)	9	(0)
2012–2013	Colo-Colo	27	(1)
2013–2016	Junior	105	(6)
2017–2019	Millonarios	65	(1)
2019	Alianza Petrolera	9	(0)
2021	Cortuluá	41	(5)
2022	Boca Juniors Cali	21	(0)
2023	Llaneros	9	(2)
Total		477	(30)
- * Club domestic league appearances and goals

Juan Guillermo Domínguez Cabezas (Spanish pronunciation: [ˈxwaŋ ɡiˈʎeɾmo ðoˈmiŋɡeθ kaˈβeθas], born 17 December 1986) is a Colombian former footballer who played as a left-back.

== Career ==
Domínguez played for Chilean club Colo-Colo from 2012 to 2013.

== Personal life ==
He is nicknamed "Carachito" after his older brother of former Switzerland's FC Sion and Colombia national football team player, Álvaro "Caracho" Domínguez.

== Honours ==
Deportivo Cali

- Torneo Finalización (1): 2005
- Copa Colombia (1): 2010

Junior

- Copa Colombia (1): 2015
