= Juan Carlos Caicedo =

Colombian footballer (born 1998)

Personal information
- Full name: Juan Carlos Caicedo Solís
- Date of birth: 4 January 1998 (age 28)
- Place of birth: El Cerrito, Colombia
- Height: 1.82 m (6 ft 0 in)
- Position: Defensive midfielder

Team information
- Current team: Patriotas Boyacá
- Number: 8

Youth career
- Semillero FC
- Deportivo Cali

Senior career*
Years	Team	Apps	(Gls)
2018–2020	Deportivo Cali	11	(0)
2020	→ Cúcuta Deportivo (loan)	9	(0)
2021–2023	Cortuluá	55	(1)
2024–	Patriotas Boyacá	11	(0)
- * Club domestic league appearances and goals as of 20:58, 1 September 2024 (UTC)

Juan Carlos Caicedo Solís (born 4 January 1998) is a Colombian footballer who plays as a defensive midfielder for Categoría Primera B side Patriotas Boyacá.

== Career ==
=== Club career ===
Caicedo started his career at Semillero FC in El Cerrito, where he played until he was 17, before moving to Deportivo Cali.

Caicedo was the first player ever from Deportivo Cali's Escuelas Filiales (Subsidiary Schools) to be called up for the clubs professional team in March 2020 at the age of 20. A few days later, on 28 March 2018, Caicedo made his professional debut for the club against Deportes Tolima, when he came on as a substitute for Christian Rivera in the half time. He played one more game in 2018 in the following month and sat on the bench for three more games the rest of the year.

In 2019, he got a few more games, making a total of nine league appearances. On 21 January 2020, 22-year old Caicedo moved to fellow league club Cúcuta Deportivo on loan for the 2020 season. He got his debut five days later, on 26 January 2020, against Patriotas Boyacá.

Caicedo returned to Cali for the 2021 season. On 23 February 2021, Caicedo joined Categoría Primera B club Cortuluá. Ahead of the 2024 season, Caicedo joined Categoría Primera A side Patriotas Boyacá.

== Personal life ==
Caicedo is the cousin of Colombian international player Jefferson Lerma.

In July 2019, Caicedo became a victim of a theft, when two men tried to close his way in the Capri neighborhood, El Cerrito, Valle del Cauca. Caicedo reacted by speeding up the car he was driving in, ending up crashing into a tree. However, he escaped unharmed and was not seriously injured.
