= Lucuma dominigensis =

Conservation status
- Endangered (IUCN 2.3)

Scientific classification
- Kingdom: Plantae
- Clade: Tracheophytes
- Clade: Angiosperms
- Clade: Eudicots
- Clade: Asterids
- Order: Ericales
- Family: Sapotaceae
- Genus: Lucuma
- Species: L. dominigensis

Binomial name
- Lucuma dominigensis C.F.Gaertn. (1807)

Synonyms
- Lucuma serpentaria var. dominigensis (C.F.Gaertn.) Dubard (1912); Pouteria dominigensis (C.F.Gaertn.) Baehni (1942); Pouteria dominigensis var. typica Baehni (1942), not validly publ.; Pouteria moaensis Alain; Radlkoferella dominigensis (C.F.Gaertn.) Pierre (1890)

Species of flowering plant

Lucuma dominigensis is a species of plant in the family Sapotaceae. It is native to Cuba, Hispaniola (Haiti and the Dominican Republic), the Bahamas, and Florida. It is threatened by habitat loss. This plant produces a round yellow fruit with an exotic flavor, a mixture between canistel (Lucuma campechiana) and Carica papaya. The pulp has with a sweet texture and is similar Lucuma campechiana. This fruit, commonly referred to as the egg-fruit due to its association with the aforementioned and more commonly known Lucuma campechiana, is what the plant is cultivated and collected for.

As the synonym Pouteria moaensis it is listed by the IUCN as an endangered species endemic to Cuba.
