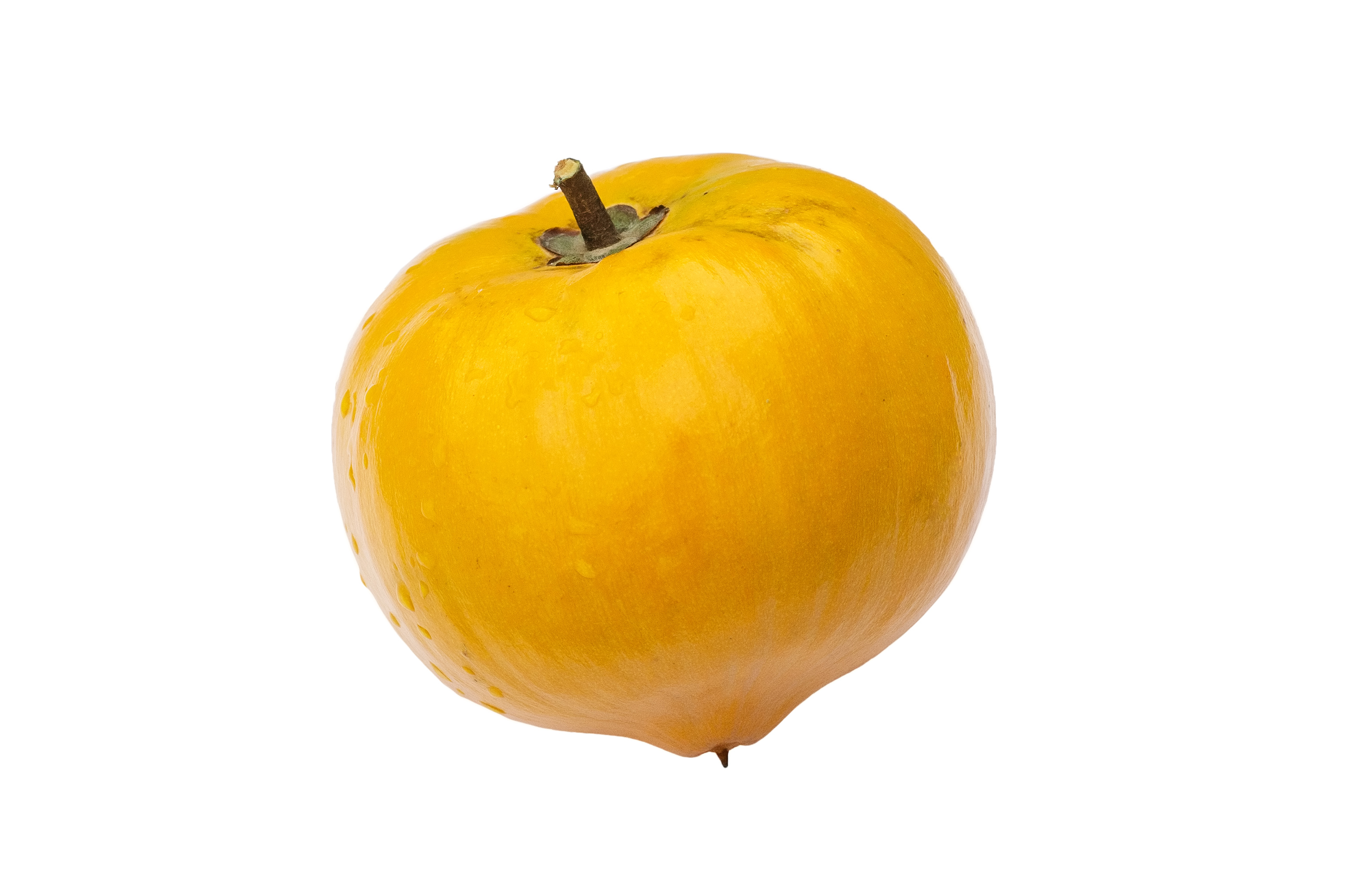
- Lucuma campechiana fruit

Scientific classification
- Kingdom: Plantae
- Clade: Tracheophytes
- Clade: Angiosperms
- Clade: Eudicots
- Clade: Asterids
- Order: Ericales
- Family: Sapotaceae
- Subfamily: Chrysophylloideae
- Genus: Lucuma; Molina

Species
- 19; see text

Synonyms
- Radlkoferella Pierre; Richardella Pierre

= Lucuma =

Genus of flowering plants

Lucuma is a genus of flowering plants in the family Sapotaceae. It includes 19 species native to the tropical and subtropical Americas, from Mexico and Florida to southern Brazil and northern Chile. The canistel (L. campechiana), and the lúcuma (L. bifera) are cultivated for their edible fruits.

== Species ==
There are 19 species assigned to this genus:

- Lucuma arguacoensium H.Karst.
- Lucuma bifera Molina
- Lucuma brachyandra (Aubrév. & Pellegr.) Swenson
- Lucuma campechiana Kunth
- Lucuma capacifolia (Pilz) Swenson
- Lucuma dominigensis C.F.Gaertn.
- Lucuma grandiflora A.DC.
- Lucuma grandis (Eyma) Swenson
- Lucuma kossmanniae (C.C.Vasconc. & Terra-Araujo) C.C.Vasconc.
- Lucuma littoralis Mart. ex Miq.
- Lucuma manaosensis (Aubrév. & Pellegr.) Swenson
- Lucuma multiflora A.DC.
- Lucuma oxypetala (T.D.Penn.) Swenson
- Lucuma pachycalyx (T.D.Penn.) Swenson
- Lucuma rivicoa C.F.Gaertn.
- Lucuma rodriguesiana (Pires & T.D.Penn.) Swenson
- Lucuma stenophylla (Baehni) Swenson
- Lucuma trigonosperma (Eyma) Swenson
- Lucuma venosa (Mart.) Mart. & Miq.
