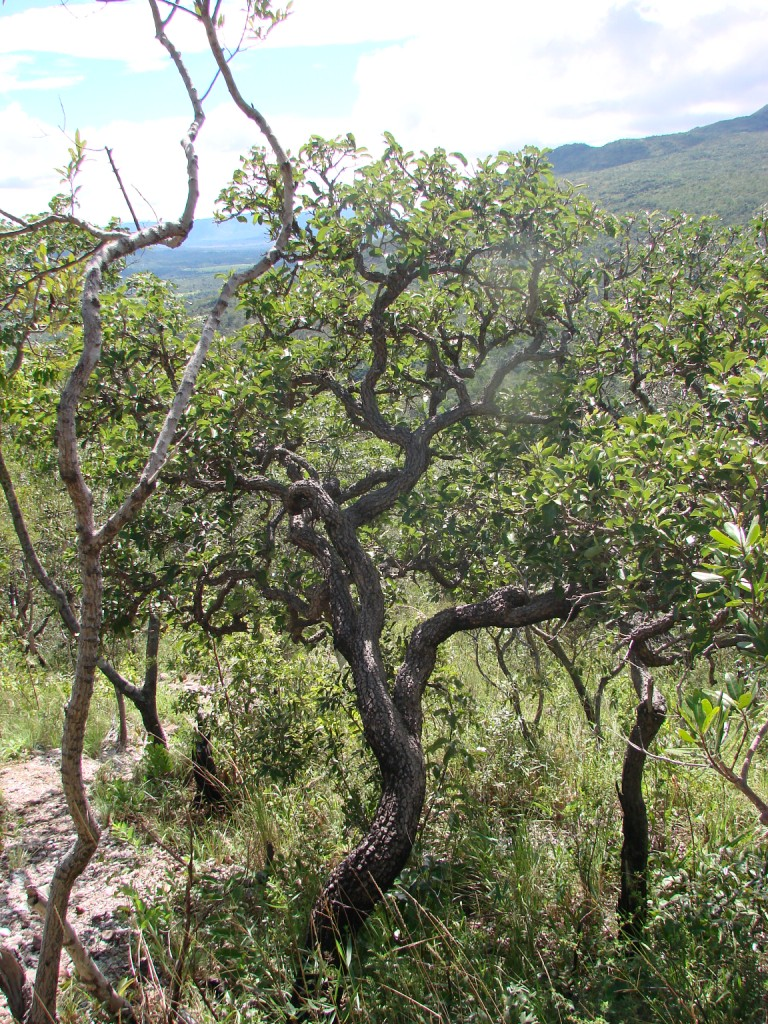
- Couepia grandiflora

Scientific classification
- Kingdom: Plantae
- Clade: Tracheophytes
- Clade: Angiosperms
- Clade: Eudicots
- Clade: Rosids
- Order: Malpighiales
- Family: Chrysobalanaceae
- Genus: Couepia; Aubl.

Synonyms
- Acia Schreb., nom. illeg. superfl.; Dulacia Neck., opus utique oppr.; Pleragina Arruda, nom. nud.

= Couepia =

Genus of fowering plants

Couepia is a genus of flowering plants in the family Chrysobalanaceae described as a genus in 1775.

Couepia is native to the tropical Americas, ranging from western and southern Mexico through Central America and tropical South America to Bolivia, Paraguay, and southern Brazil.

== Species ==
63 species are accepted.

- Couepia belemii Prance – Bahia, Espírito Santo
- Couepia bernardii Prance – NW Brazil, N Peru
- Couepia bondarii Prance – Bahia
- Couepia bracteosa Benth. – Suriname to Bolivia
- Couepia brevistaminea Barb.Silva & Antar – Goiás, Tocantins
- Couepia carautae Prance – Espírito Santo
- Couepia caryophylloides Benoist – Suriname, Fr Guiana, N Brazil
- Couepia cataractae Ducke – Rondônia, Pará
- Couepia chrysocalyx (Poepp.) Benth. ex Hook.f. – NW South America
- Couepia cidiana Prance – Pará
- Couepia coarctata Prance – Bahia
- Couepia comosa Benth. – Bolívar, Guyana
- Couepia eriantha Spruce ex Hook.f. – N Brazil
- Couepia excelsa Ducke – Fr Guiana, N Brazil
- Couepia exflexa Fanshawe & Maguire – Fr Guiana, Guyana
- Couepia froesii Prance – N Brazil
- Couepia glabra Prance – Amazonas B
- Couepia grandiflora (Mart. & Zucc.) Benth. ex Hook.f. – Brazil, Bolivia, Paraguay
- Couepia guianensis Aubl. – N South America
- Couepia habrantha Standl. – N South America
- Couepia hallwachsiae D.Santam. & Lagom. – Costa Rica
- Couepia hondurasensis Prance – Honduras
- Couepia impressa Prance – NE Brazil
- Couepia insignis Fritsch – Bahia
- Couepia janzenii D.Santam. & Lagom. – Costa Rica and Panama
- Couepia joaquinae Prance – Fr Guiana, Amapá
- Couepia krukovii Standl. – NW Brazil, Bolivia, Colombia
- Couepia latifolia Standl. – NW Brazil, Bolivia, Colombia, Peru
- Couepia leitaofilhoi Prance – São Paulo
- Couepia longipetiolata Prance – Bahia
- Couepia macrophylla Spruce ex Hook.f. – NW South America, Panama
- Couepia magnoliifolia Benth. ex Hook.f. – Amazonas B, Fr Guiana
- Couepia maguirei Prance – S Venezuela, N Brazil
- Couepia marleneae Prance – Amazonas B
- Couepia martini Prance – French Guiana
- Couepia meridionalis Prance – São Paulo
- Couepia monteclarensis Prance – Bahia, Rio de Janeiro
- Couepia morii Prance – Amazonas B
- Couepia multiflora Benth. – Guyana, Roraima
- Couepia nutans Prance – Colombia
- Couepia obovata Ducke – tropical South America
- Couepia osaensis Aguilar & D.Santam. – Costa Rica
- Couepia ovalifolia (Schott) Benth. ex Hook.f. – E Brazil
- Couepia oxossii Amorim & Asprino – Bahia
- Couepia paraensis (Mart. & Zucc.) Benth. – tropical South America
- Couepia parvifolia Prance – Rio de Janeiro
- Couepia pernambucensis Prance – Pernambuco, Bahia
- Couepia polyandra (Kunth) Rose – Mexico, Central America
- Couepia rankiniae Prance – Amazonas B, Fr Guiana
- Couepia recurva Ducke – Ecuador, Peru
- Couepia reflexa Ducke – Pará
- Couepia robusta Huber – NE Brazil
- Couepia rufa Ducke – E Brazil
- Couepia sandwithii Prance – Venezuela, Guyana
- Couepia schottii Fritsch – Bahia, Rio de Janeiro
- Couepia scottmorii Prance – Panama
- Couepia spicata Ducke – Amazonas B
- Couepia stipularis Ducke – Amazonas B
- Couepia subcordata Benth. ex Hook.f. – NW South America
- Couepia trapezioana Cuatrec. – NW South America
- Couepia uiti (Mart. & Zucc.) Benth. ex Hook.f. – Brazil, Bolivia, Paraguay
- Couepia ulei Pilg. – NW South America
- Couepia venosa Prance – SE Brazil
- Couepia williamsii J.F.Macbr. – NW South America

=== Formerly placed here ===
- Acioa dolichopoda (Prance) Sothers & Prance (as Couepia dolichopoda Prance)
- Acioa longipendula (Pilg.) Sothers & Prance (as Couepia longipendula Pilg.)
- Cordillera platycalyx (Cuatrec.) Sothers & Prance (as Couepia platycalyx Cuatrec.)
- Gaulettia canescens (Gleason) Sothers & Prance (as Couepia canescens (Gleason) Prance)
- Gaulettia canomensis (Mart.) Sothers & Prance (as Couepia canomensis (Mart.) Benth. ex Hook.f.)
- Gaulettia cognata (Steud.) Sothers & Prance (as Couepia cognata (Steud.) Fritsch)
- Gaulettia elata (Ducke) Sothers & Prance (as Couepia elata Ducke)
- Gaulettia foveolata (Prance) Sothers & Prance (as Couepia foveolata Prance)
- Gaulettia parillo (DC.) Sothers & Prance (as Couepia parillo DC.)
- Gaulettia racemosa (Benth. ex Hook.f.) Sothers & Prance (as Couepia racemosa Benth. ex Hook.f.)
- Gaulettia steyermarkii (Maguire) Sothers & Prance (as Couepia steyermarkii Maguire)
