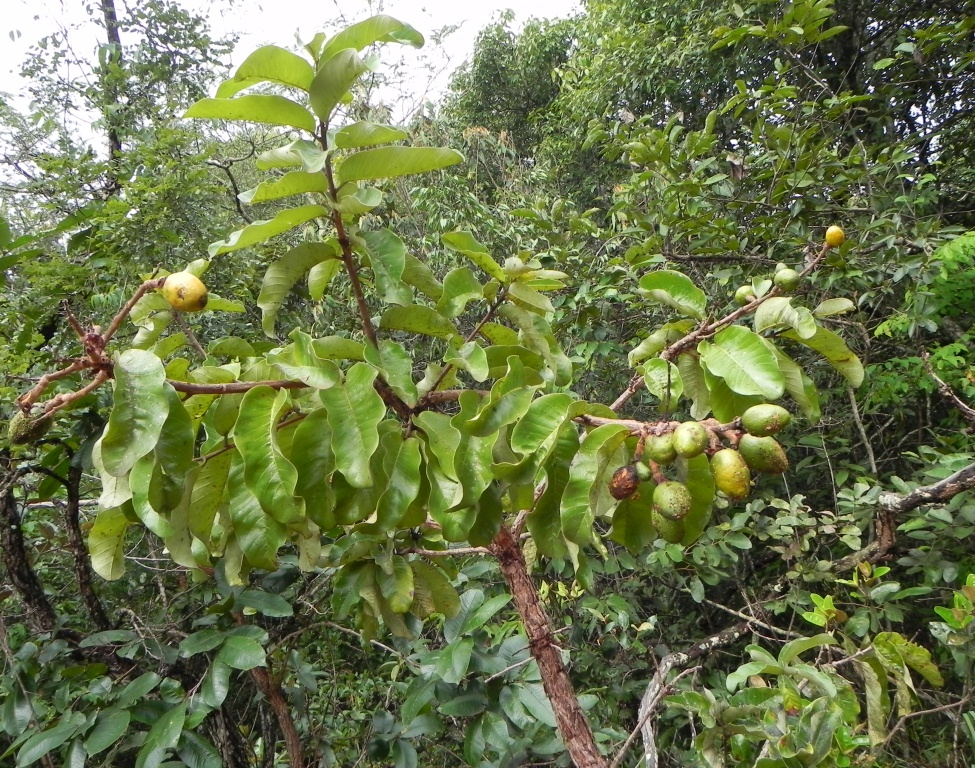

Scientific classification
- Kingdom: Plantae
- Clade: Tracheophytes
- Clade: Angiosperms
- Clade: Eudicots
- Clade: Rosids
- Order: Malpighiales
- Family: Chrysobalanaceae
- Genus: Couepia
- Species: C. grandiflora

Binomial name
- Couepia grandiflora (Mart. & Zucc.) Benth. ex Hook. f. 1867

Synonyms
- Couepia formosana Taub.; Couepia suberosa Pilg.; Moquilea grandiflora Mart. & Zucc.

= Couepia grandiflora =

Species of tree

Couepia grandiflora, or sweet angelim, is a Brazilian fruit tree found in the Cerrado.
