= Álvaro Domínguez (footballer, born 1981) =

Colombian footballer

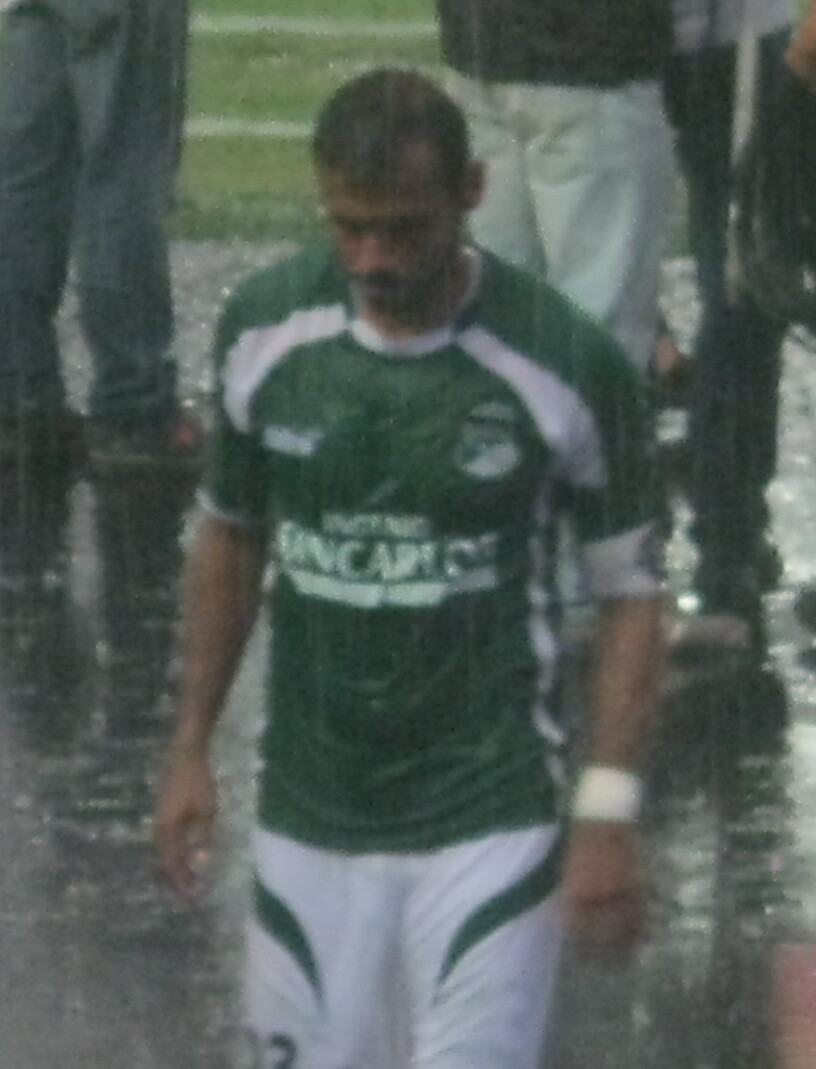
- Domínguez in 2012

Personal information
- Full name: Álvaro José Domínguez Cabezas
- Date of birth: 10 June 1981 (age 45)
- Place of birth: El Cerrito, Valle del Cauca, Colombia
- Height: 1.75 m (5 ft 9 in)
- Position: Midfielder

Youth career
- 2000: Deportivo Cali

Senior career*
Years	Team	Apps	(Gls)
2000–2007	Deportivo Cali	154	(29)
2002	→ Deportivo Pasto (loan)	9	(0)
2002	→ Atlético Huila (loan)	19	(2)
2007–2010	Sion	122	(21)
2011	→ Samsunspor (loan)	16	(2)
2012–2014	Deportivo Cali	29	(9)
2014	Junior de Barranquilla	12	(1)

International career
2003–2007	Colombia	7	(1)
- * Club domestic league appearances and goals as of 17 July 2009]

Álvaro José Domínguez Cabezas (born 10 June 1981) is a Colombian former professional footballer.

He is the older brother of the fellow footballer Juan Guillermo Domínguez.

== Career ==
=== Club ===
Álvaro Domínguez, a native of the town of El Cerrito from the center of Valle del Cauca, began his career with Deportivo Cali in 2000. In 2002, he played on loan with Deportivo Pasto and with Atlético Huila. Upon returning to Cali, Domínguez became an important player for his team. In 2005, he helped Cali to capture the Finalización title. In 2007, he joined Swiss side FC Sion, where he was recognized for his sacrifice, long-distance shots and vision of the game. While with Sion he made 122 league appearances and scored 21 goals. During this period Domínguez was a key player in helping Sion to two Swiss Cup titles. In 2011, he left Sion and joined Turkish club Samsunspor on loan. At the end of the season he returned to his native Colombia signing with his first club Deportivo Cali.

=== International ===
He played for Colombia at the 2007 Copa America against Paraguay, as well as in friendlies before the tournament.

== Honours ==
Deportivo Cali

- Copa Mustang (1): 2005-II
- Superliga Colombiana (1): 2014

Sion

- Swiss Cup (1): 2010–11
