= Couepia polyandra =

Conservation status
- Least Concern (IUCN 3.1)

Scientific classification
- Kingdom: Plantae
- Clade: Tracheophytes
- Clade: Angiosperms
- Clade: Eudicots
- Clade: Rosids
- Order: Malpighiales
- Family: Chrysobalanaceae
- Genus: Couepia
- Species: C. polyandra

Binomial name
- Couepia polyandra (Kunth) Rose ([1824] 1899)

Synonyms
- Couepia dodecandra (Moc. & Sesse ex DC.) Hemsl.; Couepia floccosa Fritsch; Couepia kunthiana (Mart. & Zucc.) Benth.; Grymania polyandra (Kunth) C.Presl; Hirtella dodecandra Moc. & Sessé; Hirtella dodecandra Moc. & Sessé ex DC.; Hirtella polyandra Kunth; Moquilea kunthiana Mart. & Zucc.

Species of plant

Couepia polyandra, also known as olosapo, zapote amarillo, baboon cap, and monkey cap, is a flowering tree in the family Chrysobalanaceae.

== Distribution ==
Couepia polyandra is native to southern Mexico south to Panama and has been introduced to Florida. It grows wild in damp thickets, riverine forests, and low woodland up to 2,000 feet (610 meters) in elevation.

== Description ==
It is an evergreen shrub or small tree with a spreading crown that grows to 3–15 meters (9.8–49.2 feet) in height. The leaves are dark green and are elliptic to ovate in shape and measure 6–13 centimeters (2.4–5.1 inches) in length and 2.5–5.5 centimeters (0.98–2.17 inches) in width. They are round to cuneate at the base and acuminate at the apex. The acumen measures 2–10 millimeters in length. They are glabrous above when mature and have a caducous pubescence when young. The underside is strongly arachnoid. The midrib is prominent above and is pubescent when young; primary veins are in pairs of 8–15 and are prominent on both surfaces. The stipules of the leaves measure 2–4 millimeters in length and are linear, membranous, and caducous. The petioles measure 4–7 millimeters in length and are terete with 2 inconspicuous medial glands. The inflorescences are terminal and axillary panicles. The rachis and branches have a short, light brown pubescence and the bracts and bracteoles measure 1–3.5 millimeters in length and are ovate and caducous. The receptacle is subcylindrical and measures around 4 millimeters in length and has a short, appressed pubescence on the exterior and is glabrous within except for the deflexed hairs at the throat. The calyx lobes are rounded and the petals number 5 and are white and glabrous but have ciliate margins. It has 11–21 stamens, which are inserted in an arc of 180–240 degrees with a few staminodes opposite. The ovary is villous and pubescent for half its length. The bark is brown in color and mostly smooth. The fruit is edible and is yellow to orange-yellow in color when ripe and is green when unripe. It is ovoid in shape and measures 5–8 centimeters (2.0–3.1 inches) in length and 3–4 centimeters (1.2–1.6 inches) in width. It contains one large seed. The epicarp is glabrous, smooth, and thin. The mesocarp is thick and fleshy. The endocarp is thin, fragile, fibrous, and glabrous within. The flesh is fibrous, semi-dry, and egg yolk-like in consistency. It is said to have a mild, sweet flavor similar to canistel when ripe but to have a very astringent flavor when unripe. The plant requires a sunny position to grow and is fairly drought-resistant. Trees begin fruiting at about 6 years of age.

== Uses ==
The fruit is gathered from the wild and eaten and it is occasionally cultivated for its fruit.

== Chemistry ==
A new triterpene, 3beta,16beta,23-triacetoxyolean-12-en-28-oic acid, was isolated from Couepia polyandra, as well as four known compounds, oleanolic acid, betulinic acid, stigmasterol, and beta-sitosterol. All five compounds inhibited DNA polymerase beta lyase activity.

== Pests ==
The trees are largely disease-free but may be attacked by seed weevils.

== See also ==
- List of culinary fruits
