= Lucuma stenophylla =

Conservation status
- Vulnerable (IUCN 3.1)

Scientific classification
- Kingdom: Plantae
- Clade: Tracheophytes
- Clade: Angiosperms
- Clade: Eudicots
- Clade: Asterids
- Order: Ericales
- Family: Sapotaceae
- Genus: Lucuma
- Species: L. stenophylla

Binomial name
- Lucuma stenophylla (Baehni) Swenson

Synonyms
- Pouteria stenophylla Baehni; Radlkoferella stenophylla (Baehni) Aubrév.

Extinct species of flowering plant

Lucuma stenophylla was a species of flowering plant in the family Sapotaceae. It is a tree endemic to southeastern Brazil, where it grows in restinga (coastal moist forests growing on sand) in the states of Rio de Janeiro and Espírito Santo, and in moist Atlantic Forest and the transition between Atlantic Forest and Cerrado grasslands in the state of Minas Gerais.

The species has been subject to habitat loss. The IUCN assesses the species as vulnerable, while Plants of the World Online assesses it as extinct.
