= Lucuma oxypetala =

Conservation status
- Near Threatened (IUCN 3.1)

Scientific classification
- Kingdom: Plantae
- Clade: Tracheophytes
- Clade: Angiosperms
- Clade: Eudicots
- Clade: Asterids
- Order: Ericales
- Family: Sapotaceae
- Genus: Lucuma
- Species: L. oxypetala

Binomial name
- Lucuma oxypetala (T.D.Penn.) Swenson

Synonyms
- Pouteria oxypetala T.D.Penn.

Species of flowering plant

Lucuma oxypetala is a species of flowering plant in the family Sapotaceae. It is endemic to eastern Brazil, ranging from southeastern Bahia state to eastern São Paulo state. It is threatened by habitat loss.
