= Lucuma venosa =

Conservation status
- Least Concern (IUCN 3.1)

Scientific classification
- Kingdom: Plantae
- Clade: Tracheophytes
- Clade: Angiosperms
- Clade: Eudicots
- Clade: Asterids
- Order: Ericales
- Family: Sapotaceae
- Genus: Lucuma
- Species: L. venosa

Binomial name
- Lucuma venosa (Mart.) Mart. & Miq.

Synonyms
- List: Achras venosa Mart.; Pouteria venosa (Mart.) Baehni; Radlkoferella venosa (Mart.) Pierre; Sapota venosa (Mart.) A.DC.; Vitellaria venosa (Mart.) Radlk.; Achras laurifolia Casar.; Lucuma casarettii A.DC.; Lucuma curvifolia Mart. & Eichler; Lucuma marginata Mart. & Eichler; Lucuma warmingii Eichler; Pouteria casarettii (A.DC.) Baehni; Pouteria marginata (Mart. & Eichler) Rizzini; Pouteria venosa subsp. venosa; Radlkoferella casarettii (A.DC.) Aubrév.; Radlkoferella curvifolia (Mart. & Eichler) Pierre; Radlkoferella marginata (Mart. & Eichler) Pierre; Radlkoferella warmingii (Eichler) Pierre; Sapota curvifolia (Mart. & Eichler) Klotzsch ex Miq.; Sapota sellowiana Klotzsch ex Miq.; Vitellaria casarettii (A.DC.) Radlk.; Vitellaria curvifolia (Mart. & Eichler) Radlk.; Vitellaria marginata (Mart. & Eichler) Radlk.; Vitellaria warmingii (Eichler) Engl.

Species of flowering plant

Lucuma venosa, also known as aboirana, is a species of plant in the family Sapotaceae. It is a species of evergreen tree native to the forests of Southern and Southeast Brazil.

== Description ==
Lucuma venosa grows from about 12 m (40 ft) to 24 m (80 ft) in height. Its fruit is edible, about 1 to 4 cm in diameter, and has a slightly sweet flavor.

Bark

Fruit

Leaves

== Taxonomy ==
The Lucuma genus was reinstated in 2023 alongside several other genera. Prior to this, L. venosa was considered part of the Pouteria genus.

== Distribution and habitat ==
Lucuma venosa grows mainly in rainforests. It prefers partial shade.

== Uses ==
Lucuma venosa's wood may be used for construction. Other parts of the plant have medicinal uses, such as the bark and grated fruit, which may be used as an antidiarrheal, or the seeds, which may be used to treat chest pain or arrhythmia.
