= Lucuma pachycalyx =

Conservation status
- Critically Endangered (IUCN 2.3)

Scientific classification
- Kingdom: Plantae
- Clade: Tracheophytes
- Clade: Angiosperms
- Clade: Eudicots
- Clade: Asterids
- Order: Ericales
- Family: Sapotaceae
- Genus: Lucuma
- Species: L. pachycalyx

Binomial name
- Lucuma pachycalyx (T.D.Penn.) Swenson

Synonyms
- Pouteria pachycalyx T.D.Penn.

Species of flowering plant

Lucuma pachycalyx is a species of flowering plant in the family Sapotaceae. It is a tree endemic to eastern Brazil. Its common name is Cutite de Restinga or Manteiguinha. It is native to lowland rainforest on sandy soils.
