= Lucuma arguacoensium =

Conservation status
- Least Concern (IUCN 3.1)

Scientific classification
- Kingdom: Plantae
- Clade: Tracheophytes
- Clade: Angiosperms
- Clade: Eudicots
- Clade: Asterids
- Order: Ericales
- Family: Sapotaceae
- Genus: Lucuma
- Species: L. arhuacoensium

Binomial name
- Lucuma arhuacoensium H.Karst.

Synonyms
- Lucuma deliciosa Linden; Lucuma arhuacoensium (H.Karst.) Baehni; Radlkoferella arhuacoensium (H.Karst.) Pierre

Species of flowering plant

Lucuma arhuacoensium is a species of plant in the family Sapotaceae. It is a tree endemic to the Sierra Nevada de Santa Marta in northeastern Colombia, where it grows in montane moist forest and shrubland from 1300 to 2300 meters elevation. It is used as a medicine and for food.
