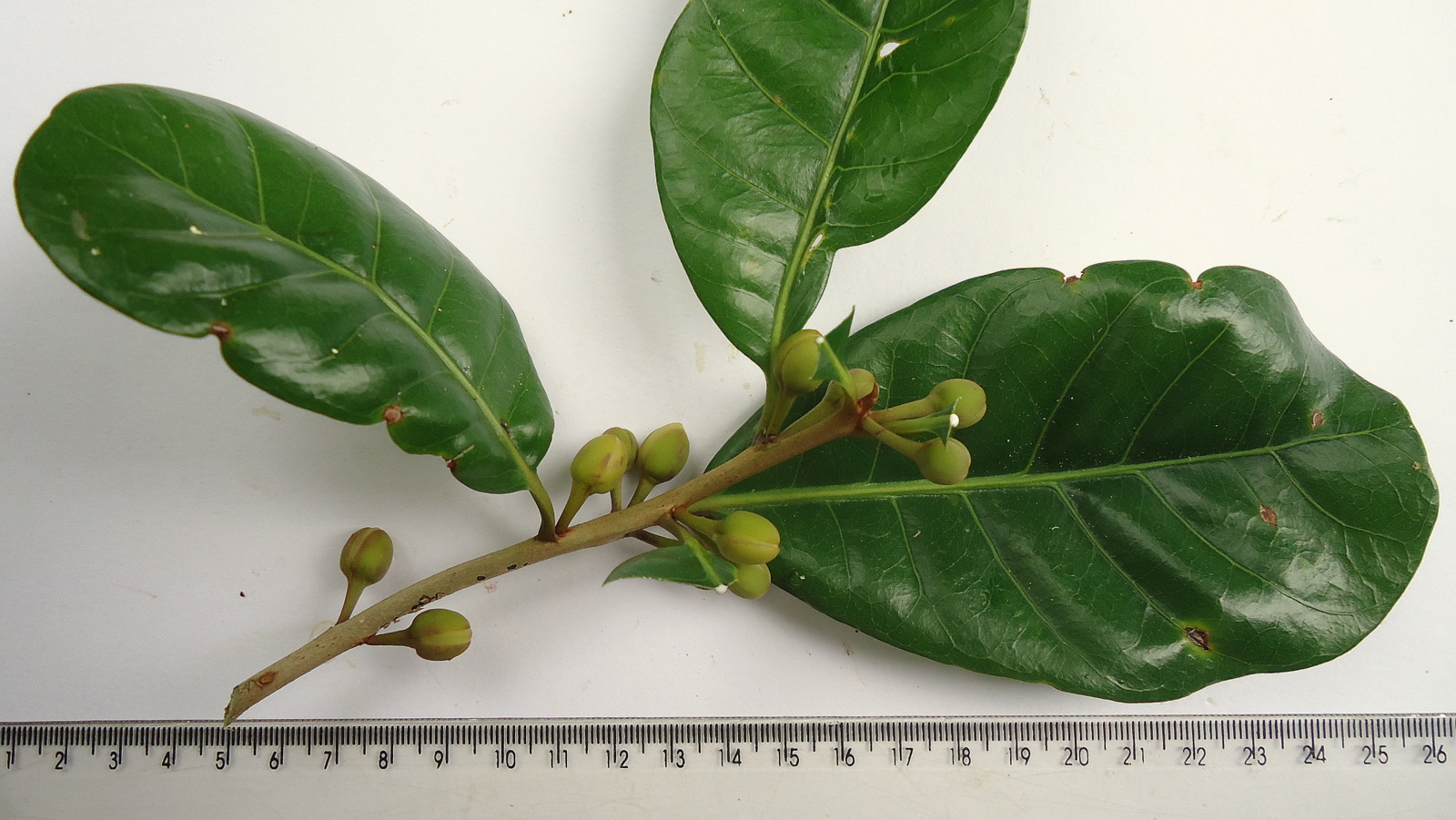

Conservation status
- Near Threatened (IUCN 2.3)

Scientific classification
- Kingdom: Plantae
- Clade: Tracheophytes
- Clade: Angiosperms
- Clade: Eudicots
- Clade: Asterids
- Order: Ericales
- Family: Sapotaceae
- Genus: Lucuma
- Species: L. grandiflora

Binomial name
- Lucuma grandiflora A.DC.

Synonyms
- Pouteria grandiflora (A.DC.) Baehni; Radlkoferella eichleri (Engl.) Pierre; Radlkoferella grandiflora (A.DC.) Pierre; Vitellaria eichleri Engl.; Vitellaria grandiflora (A.DC.) Radlk.

= Lucuma grandiflora =

Species of flowering plant

Lucuma grandiflora is a species of plant in the family Sapotaceae. It is endemic to eastern Bahia state of northeastern Brazil, where it is native to coastal restinga forests.

The seeds are large and quite unique with a glossy brown patch surrounded by a dull grey coating. This gives them their common name Eye of Tandera (Olho de Tandera). It is also known as the Bread of Christ (Pão de Cristo).
