= Lucuma capacifolia =

Conservation status
- Endangered (IUCN 3.1)

Scientific classification
- Kingdom: Plantae
- Clade: Tracheophytes
- Clade: Angiosperms
- Clade: Eudicots
- Clade: Asterids
- Order: Ericales
- Family: Sapotaceae
- Genus: Lucuma
- Species: L. capacifolia

Binomial name
- Lucuma capacifolia (Pilz) Swenson

Synonyms
- Pouteria capacifolia Pilz

Species of flowering plant

Lucuma capacifolia is a species of flowering plant in the family Sapotaceae. It is a tree endemic to northwestern Ecuador, where it is known as mamey. It is native to the provinces of Esmeraldas, Manabí, Santo Domingo de los Tsáchilas, and Pichincha, where it grows in lowland and foothill evergreen tropical moist forest from 80 to 920 meters elevation. It threatened by habitat loss from the deforestation and conversion to agriculture of its native forests. It has an estimated extent of occurrence (EOO) of 9,949 km^{2}, and an area of occupancy of 72 km^{2}, and its remaining populations are often small and fragmented. The species is assessed as endangered by the IUCN.
