= Lucuma rodriguesiana =

Conservation status
- Near Threatened (IUCN 2.3)

Scientific classification
- Kingdom: Plantae
- Clade: Tracheophytes
- Clade: Angiosperms
- Clade: Eudicots
- Clade: Asterids
- Order: Ericales
- Family: Sapotaceae
- Genus: Lucuma
- Species: L. rodriguesiana

Binomial name
- Lucuma rodriguesiana (Pires & T.D.Penn.) Swenson

Synonyms
- Pouteria rodriguesiana Pires & T.D.Penn.

Species of flowering plant

Lucuma rodriguesiana is a species of plant in the family Sapotaceae. It is a tree native to northern Brazil (Amapá and Pará states), French Guiana, and Suriname. It grows in lowland terre firme (non-flooded) rainforest up to 700 meters elevation.
