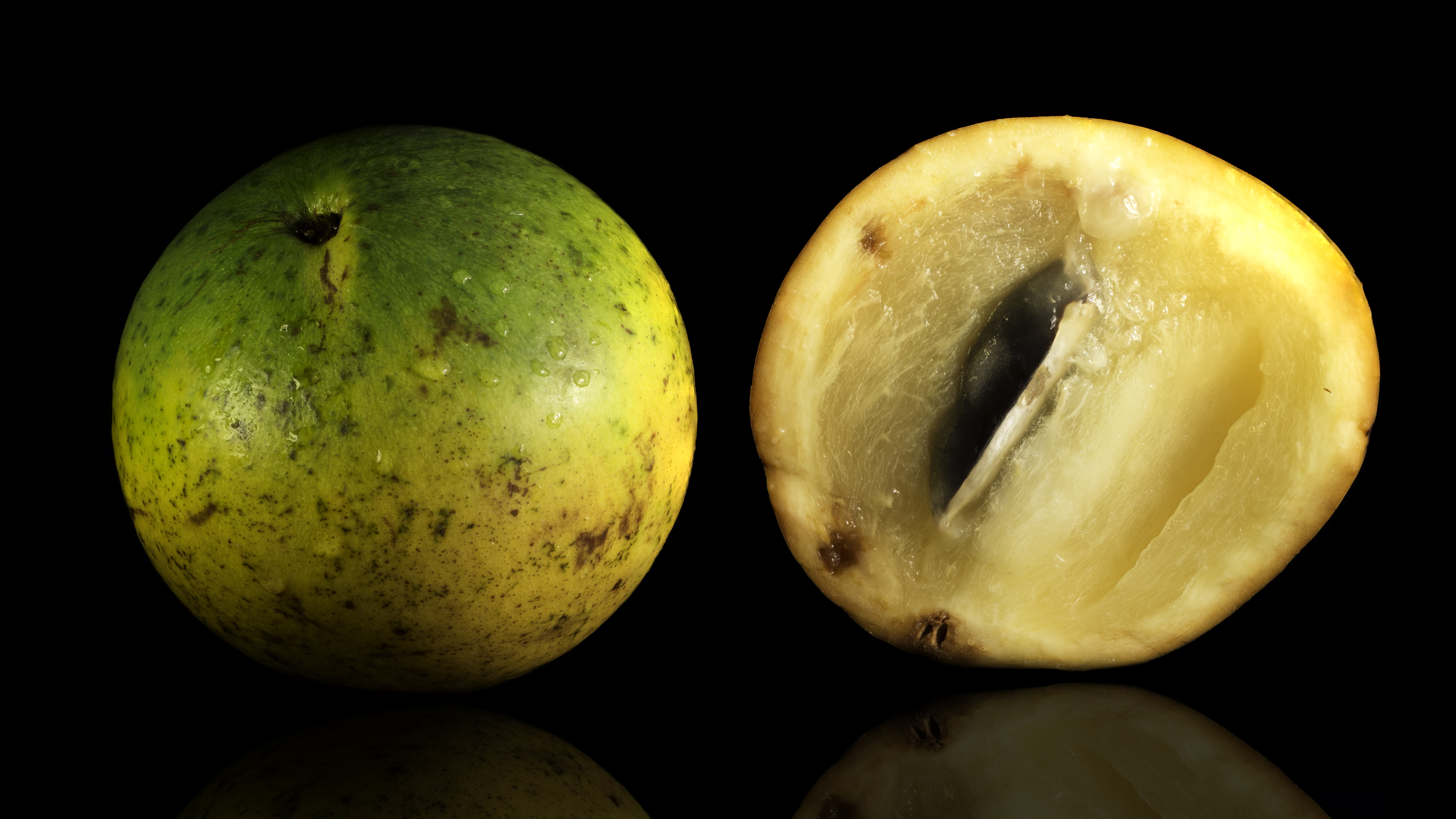
- Fruit, whole and halved

Conservation status
- Least Concern (IUCN 3.1)

Scientific classification
- Kingdom: Plantae
- Clade: Embryophytes
- Clade: Tracheophytes
- Clade: Angiosperms
- Clade: Eudicots
- Clade: Asterids
- Order: Ericales
- Family: Sapotaceae
- Genus: Pouteria
- Species: P. caimito

Binomial name
- Pouteria caimito (Ruiz & Pav.) Radlk.

Synonyms
- List: Achras caimito Ruiz & Pav.; Caleatia caimito (Ruiz & Pav.) Mart. ex Steud.; Guapeba caimito (Ruiz & Pav.) Pierre; Labatia caimito (Ruiz & Pav.) Mart.; Lucuma caimito (Ruiz & Pav.) Roem. & Schult.; Pouteria caimito var. typica Baehni; Achras guapeda Casar.; Guapeba lasiocarpa (Mart.) Pierre; Guapeba laurifolia Gomes; Guapebeira brasiliensis Steud.; Guapebeira laurifolia Gomes; Labatia lasiocarpa Mart.; Labatia reticulata Mart.; Lucuma lasiocarpa (Mart.) A.DC.; Lucuma laurifolia (Gomes) A.DC.; Lucuma laurifolia var. reticulata (Mart.) A.DC.; Lucuma temare Kunth; Pouteria caimito var. laurifolia (Gomes) Baehni; Pouteria lasiocarpa (Mart.) Radlk.; Pouteria laurifolia (Gomes) Radlk.; Pouteria leucophaea Baehni; Pouteria temare (Kunth) Aubrév.; Richardella temare (Kunth) Pierre

= Pouteria caimito =

Species of plant

Pouteria caimito, the abiu (Portuguese pronunciation: [ɐˈbiw]), is a tropical fruit tree in the family Sapotaceae. It grows in the Amazonian region of South America, and this type of fruit can also be found in Cuba, the Philippines and other countries in Southeast Asia. It grows to an average of 10 metres (33 feet) high, with ovoid fruits. The inside of the fruit is translucent and white. It has a creamy and jelly-like texture with a taste resembling caramel custard.^{†}

== Description ==
P. caimito grows to an average of 10 metres (33 feet) high, and can grow as high as 35 metres (115 ft) under good conditions.

The leaves range from oblong to elliptical. They can be 10–20 centimetres (4–8 inches) in length and 3.5–6.5 cm (1 1/2–2 1/2 in) in width.

Abiu may have several flowering periods a year, with potential for both flowers and fruit on the tree at one time. The development time from flower to ripe fruit is about 3 months. The main crop season varies by climate.

The flowers on the tree may occur either singly or in clusters of two to five flowers. They appear on the leaf axils on long, thin shoots. The flowers are small with four to five petals. The petals are cylindrical and are white to greenish in color. The flowers are hermaphroditic, meaning they are both sexes. The flowers open in the morning and can stay open for about two days.

=== Aroma and volatile compounds ===
Volatile profiling by GC–MS indicates defensive and aroma-related compounds vary by organ: leaves show compounds associated with plant protection, including capsaicin and 1-fluorododecane; Unripe fruit includes 5-hydroxy-4-methyl-6-hepten-3-one, methylcyclopentane, 2-hexenal and 3-hexanol; ripe pulp and peel are dominated by ketones and C6 aldehydes such as hexanal and 2-hexenal that contribute to ripening aroma.

In Ecuador, the fruits are in season during March and April, but may also produce in other times of the year. In some Brazilian markets, they are sold from September to April, but at this time, they are sparse. Bahia has a short season in February and March. In Florida, the fruits ripen from August to October. In northern Queensland, Australia, the main crop ripens January to March.

Mature abiu trees produce 100 to 1,000 fruits each year. They measure 3–9 cm (1–3 1/2 in) across, vary from round to oval, and are pointed at the distal end. When ripe, they have smooth, bright yellow skin. Inside is a pale, translucent pulp of a custard consistency that is easily scooped out with a spoon; also, a few bits of tougher gel may be found. The fruits have one to four ovate seeds, which are easily removed and are covered with a thin layer of adherent pulp. The fruit has a sweet, mild taste, which may have a hint of pineapple, but is best described as reminiscent of caramel flan. It is often used in ice cream or eaten out of hand.

Unripe fruits contain a gummy and unpalatable latex that hardens upon exposure to air. The skin of the ripe fruit is a pale yellow color with a leathery texture and residual latex. Because mature fruits continue to ripen when picked, the harvest can be timed to allow for transportation to market. However, this period may be as short as five days. Maturation can be recognized by the pale green-to-yellow color break and the ripe fruit can be identified by its yellow coloration and a slight softness.

The abiu varies in form, size, and quality of the fruit. Some have soft and others firm flesh. Some taste bland while others have very nice flavor. In Colombia along the Putamayo River, one variety has large, round fruits that are produced after four years. In Vaupes, Colombia, a variety bears fruit just one year after seeding; however, these fruits are small and contain little pulp.

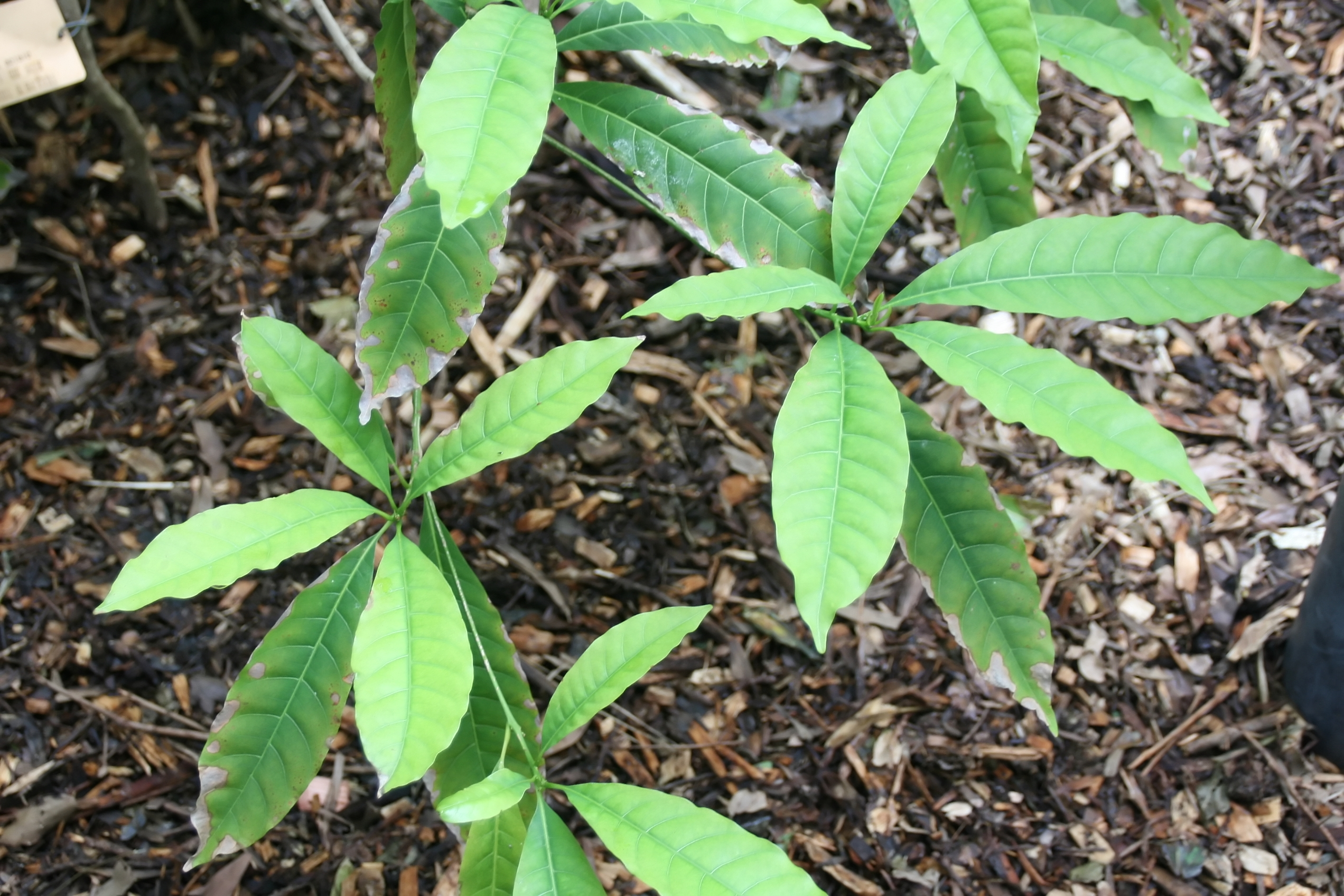
Leaves

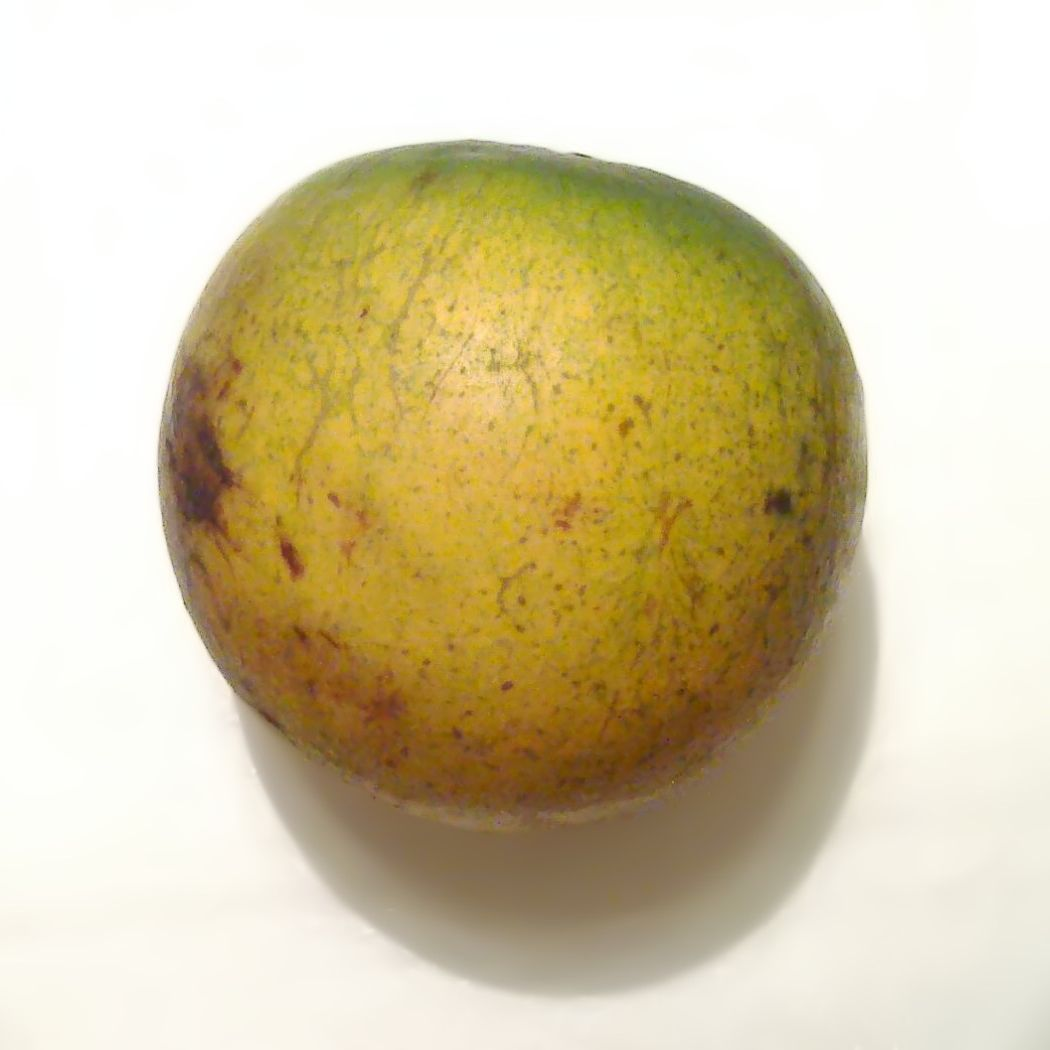
P. caimito fruit

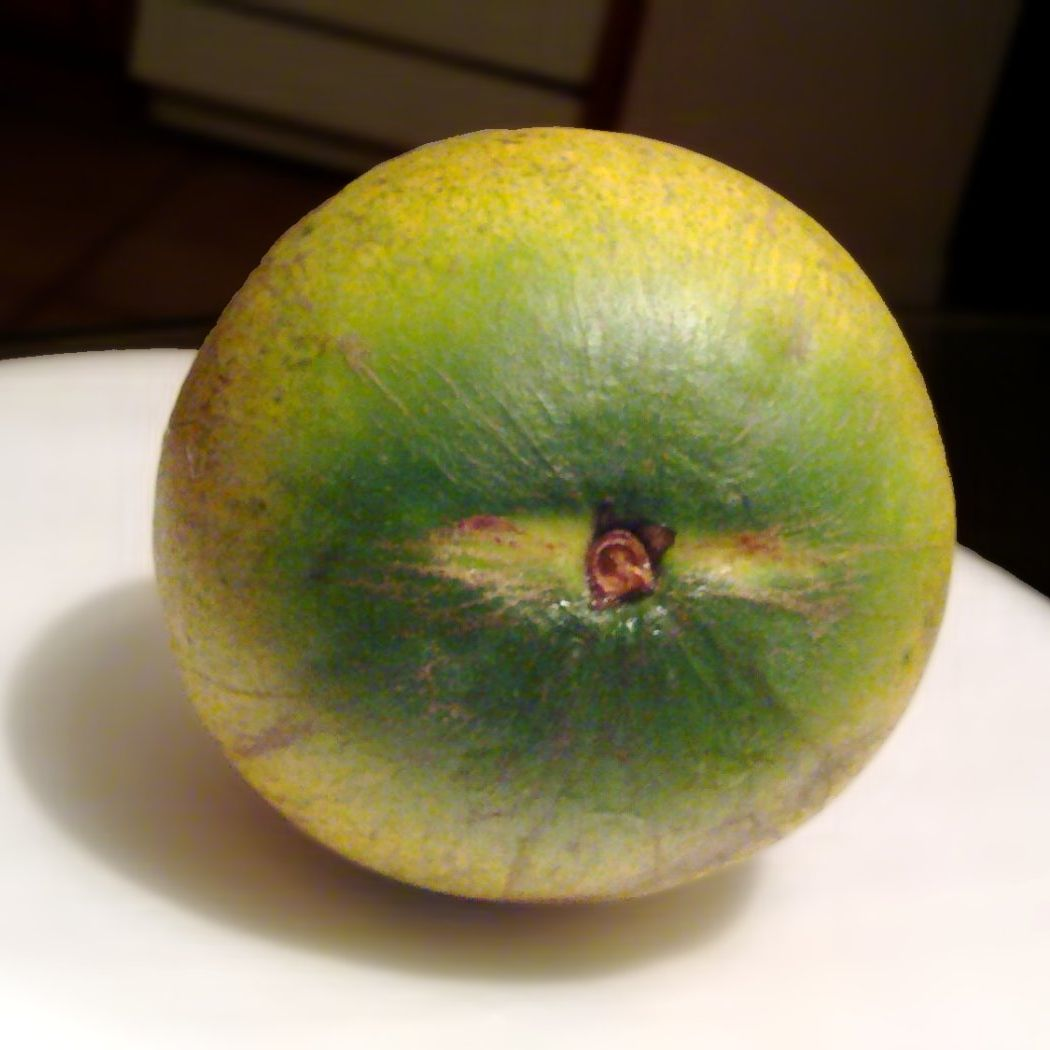
The short-stemmed fruit breaks off cleanly.

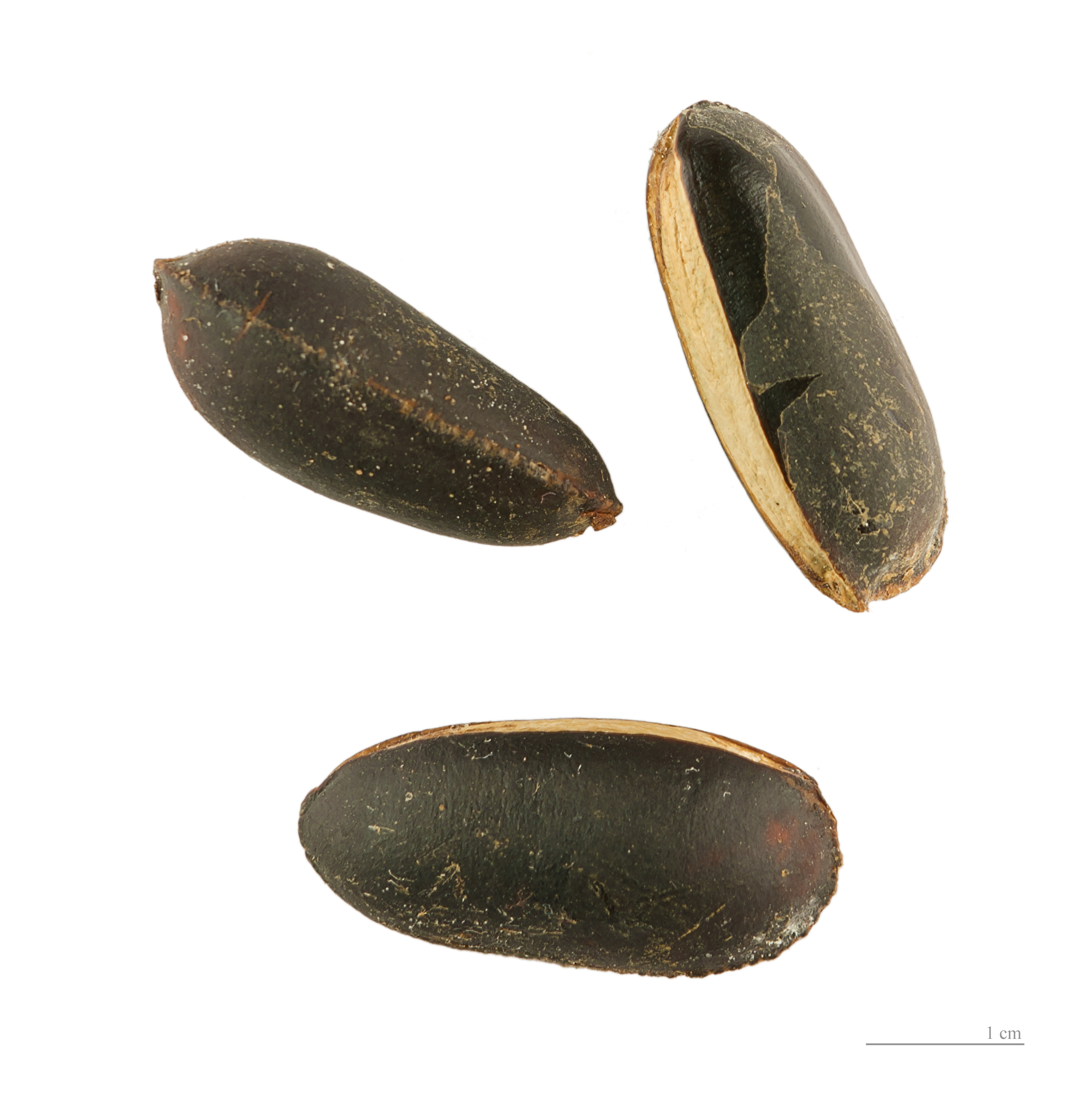
P. caimito seeds

=== Similar species ===
The abiu tree is very similar in appearance to the canistel.

== Distribution and habitat ==
P. caimito is commonly considered to be native to the headwaters of the Amazon. It grows wild in the lower eastern part of the Andes from southwestern Venezuela to Peru. It also grows around Tingo Maria and Iquitos, Peru, and it can commonly be found in the Province of Guayas in Ecuador, where it is sold in the markets. The abiu was cultivated by Amerindians and it became widespread in the Amazon, but the origins of the fruit's distribution outside the Amazon is uncertain. In the Amazon basin, it is found to grow heavily in the northern Brazilian state of Pará, but is also found sparsely in collections from the Atlantic rainforest near Rio de Janeiro and Bahia. It can also be found in Colombia in areas such as the regions of Caquetá, Meta, and Vaupes and it is very plentiful in Amazonas, Venezuela and in Cuba. It has also been growing for a very long time in Trinidad and it is endemic in some parts of Southeast Asia like Indonesia and the Philippines.

The abiu grows best in areas that have a year-round moist and warm climate. It can now be found throughout most of the Amazon basin. It is a common dooryard tree in the backyards and streets in the city of many Brazilian towns, but it is not usually grown commercially. It has also been introduced outside of the Americas; for example, it is grown on the Pacific island of Tahiti since 1993. The abiu habitats are nearly all tropical. It thrives in a place that has a year-round warm and moist climate, although it has been known to grow well in Rio de Janeiro, which is a somewhat cooler climate. In Peru, it cannot grow above 610 metres (2,000 ft) feet in elevation, but in Colombia, it has been found growing up to an elevation of 1,800 m (6,000 ft).

== Cultivation ==
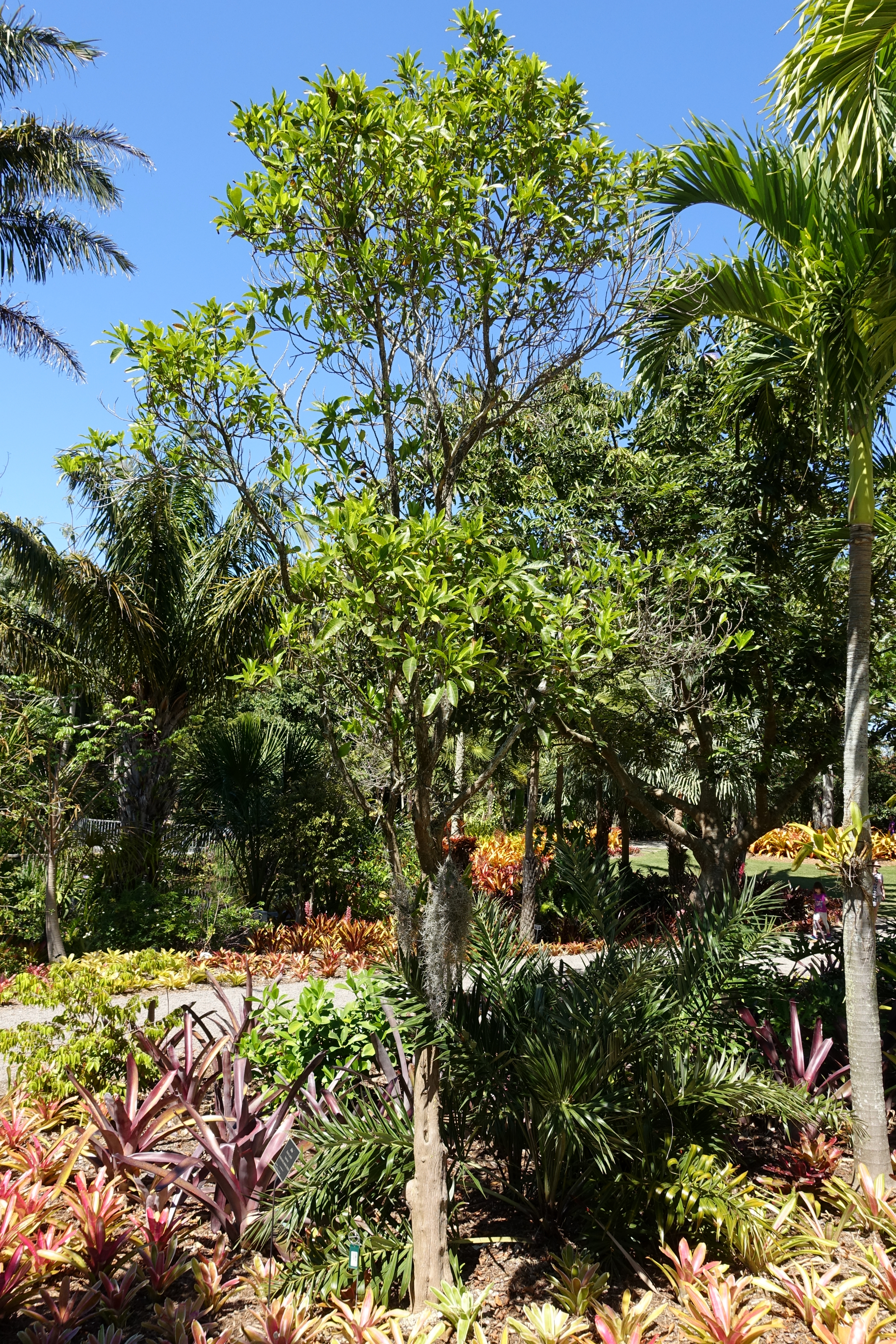
Young tree

The tree grows best in tropical areas and in places that have a warm, moist climate all year long, and is slightly less hardy than related sapotes such as the canistel and sapodilla (nispero). Within the United States, it grows well in South Florida as far north as Palm Beach County, and has survived brief freezes. It prefers wet, slightly acidic soil with high organic content, and may suffer from iron deficiency (chlorosis) in alkaline soils. A tree that has just been planted is fragile and needs protection from wind and cold weather. Only light pruning is necessary and feeding should be frequent, but light.

=== Propagation ===
Propagation is nearly always by seeds, but the fruit of seedling trees is variable. Fresh seeds need to be planted within a few days if they are to remain viable, and germinate in two to three weeks. The lower branches of the seedling may be pruned after a year, and the first fruit can be expected in three years, with substantial yields at five years. Grafting, budding, and air layering can be used to propagate superior strains and advance the production schedule.

=== Pests and diseases ===
The commercial value of the fruit in its native range is limited because it is often damaged by small insects. In Brazil, the main pest that destroys the fruit is thought to be the fruit fly. Thrips are known to attack buds, leaves, and young fruits, but in exotic locations, abiu can be relatively pest-free, especially if fruit is harvested at maturity and ripened off the tree.

=== Postharvest preservation ===
Immersion of harvested fruit in 10 mM ascorbic acid has been shown to extend shelf life to 12 days—around nine days longer than untreated fruit. The treatment reduced weight loss and browning, delayed the climacteric peak, lowered respiration and ethylene production, and helped maintain vitamin C content and firmness.

== Uses ==
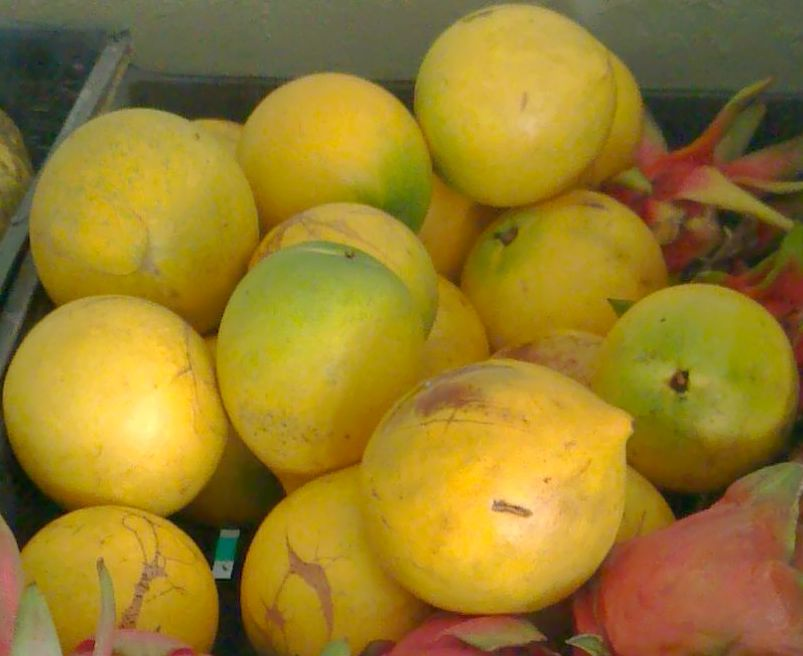
P. caimito fruits at a Miami fruit stand in August

The wood of the abiu tree is dense, heavy, and hard and is used as lumber in construction.

=== Culinary ===
The fruit of the abiu tree is edible and considered one of the best of the sapotes due to having the sweet, caramel-like taste of sapodilla with a smoother texture. It is commonly eaten out of hand, although in Colombia, those eating the fruit this way are advised to grease their lips to keep the gummy latex from sticking; this hazard can be avoided by selecting fully ripe fruits and scooping out the flesh with a utensil. The tartness of a bit of added lime juice may enhance the flavor, especially when chilled. The melting, sweet pulp of the abiu is also used to flavor ice cream and cut into yogurt for a light and delicious breakfast. The subtlety of the flavor limits its use in more complex confections and salads. Abiu fruit is a significant source of calcium, phosphorus, vitamin A, and vitamin C.

=== Nutritional and phytochemical studies ===
Compositional work on Amazonian fruits reports that abiu pulp has high soluble solids and sugars and a comparatively high pH among surveyed species. A 2025 study on P. caimito ("abiu-do-mato") found the peel had the highest antioxidant activity and phenolic content, followed by pulp and seeds; GC–MS of hexane extracts identified 19 major compounds including palmitic, elaidic, and linoleic acids, while methanolic extracts contained catechin derivatives; in vitro assays reported no cytotoxicity under the tested conditions.

=== Bioproducts and postharvest applications ===
Nanoparticles synthesized using abiu fruit extract and calcium chloride inhibited apple ring rot caused by Botryosphaeria dothidea and extended the shelf life of fresh-cut apples by about seven days in storage tests, with increases in antioxidant and defense enzyme activities in treated fruit.

== Vernacular names ==
The fruit is known by different regional names in countries of production; in Brazil, it is known as abiu, in Trinidad it is the yellow star apple or caimitt, there are also the purple and green skin caimitt varieties (distinct from the star apple); Colombians know it as the caimo, caimito amarillo (again not to be confused with Chrysophyllum cainito, which is known as caimito in some countries) or madura verde; in Ecuador it is known as the luma or cauje; in Venezuela as temare; in Portugal as abieiro; in Bolivia is known as kepi; and in Ghana as alasa. It is also known as abio.

== Notes ==
- ^†Morton's book was the original basis for this article and uncited information can be assumed to come from that source.
