= El Cerrito, Valle del Cauca =

El Cerrito
- Municipality and town
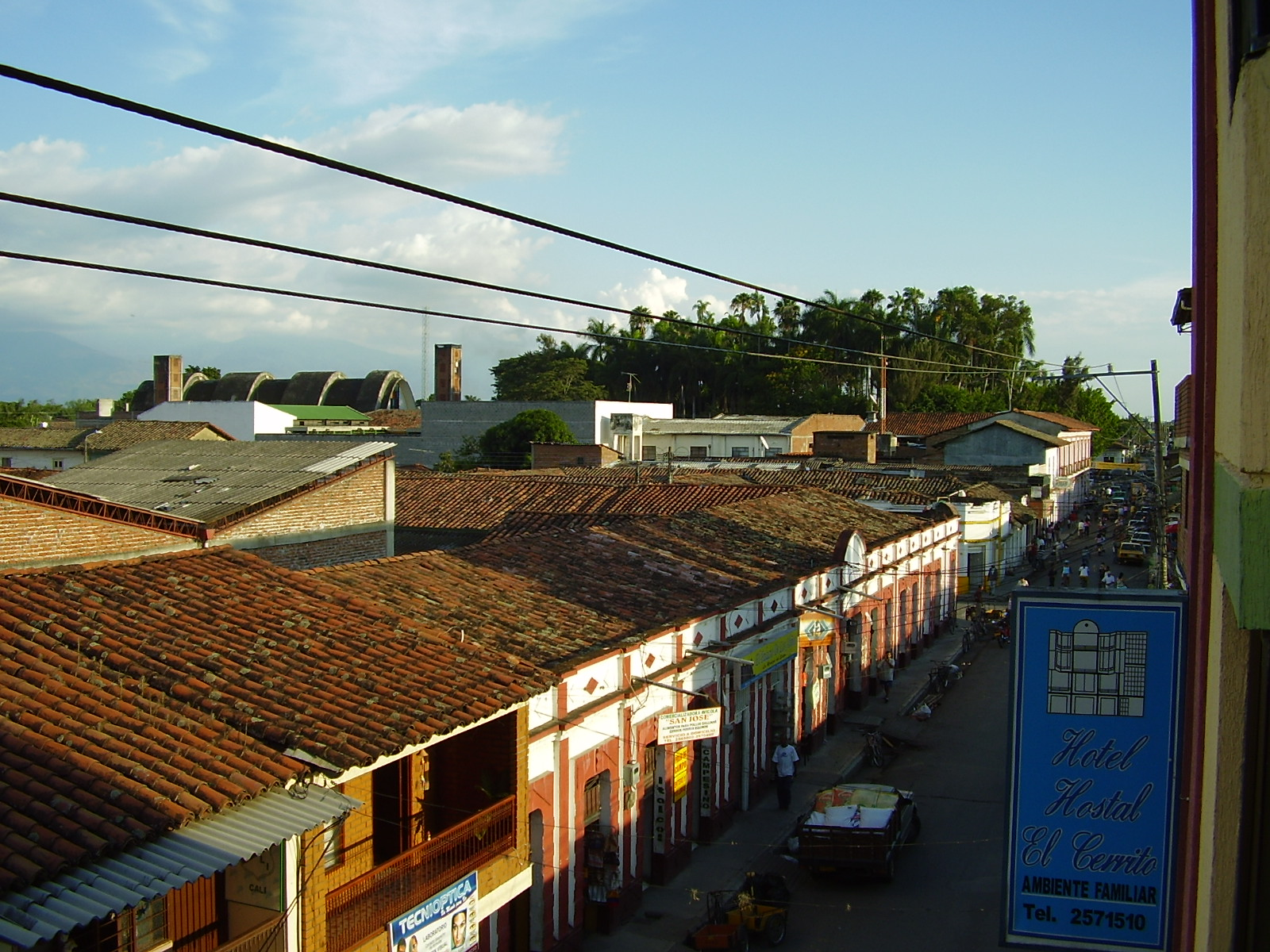

- Flag Coat of arms
- Nickname: Ciudad Cariño
- Motto: Paz y Virtud
- Location of the municipality and town of El Cerrito, Valle del Cauca in the Valle del Cauca Department of Colombia.

- Location in Colombia
- Coordinates: 3°40′N 76°10′W
- Country: Colombia
- Department: Valle del Cauca Department

Area
  - Municipality and town: 441.9 km^{2} (170.6 sq mi)
  - Urban: 3.52 km^{2} (1.36 sq mi)
- Elevation: 967 m (3,173 ft)

Population (2018 census)
  - Municipality and town: 56,470
  - Density: 127.8/km^{2} (331.0/sq mi)
  - Urban: 35,977
  - Urban density: 10,200/km^{2} (26,500/sq mi)
- Time zone: UTC-5 (Colombia Standard Time)
- Website: http://elcerrito-valle.gov.co/

El Cerrito is a town and municipality located in the Department of Valle del Cauca, Colombia. This is one of the 42 municipalities of the department.

The town is known for having within its jurisdiction the hacienda "El Paraíso", where the writer Jorge Isaacs lived and set his novel María. Part of its territory also belongs to the Parque Nacional Natural Las Hermosas. Is situated 47 km east to Cali, the capital of the department.

== Toponym ==
The name of the municipality and the head is of Spanish origin (El Cerrito translates literally into English as The Small Hill), and it refers to the hill where the population resides. It is a massif in the Colombian Andean Region.

== Geography ==
It is located on a plain by the river that bears its name, on the western slope of the Cordillera Central.

Its coordinates are between 1°13' to 2° West longitude and 4° to 5° North latitude, at an altitude of 987 m over sea level and its average temperature is 24 °C.

Its topography comprises two areas: The first one is the mountainous western side of Cordillera Central; its highest peaks are Paramo de las Hermosas (3,500 meters high), the Cerro Pan de Azúcar and El Alto de la Cruz. The second area is flat or slightly wavy and belongs to the valley of the Cauca River. The territory corresponds to the thermal floors warm, half cold and wilderness. The hydrography of the municipality is composed by the rivers Amaime, Cauca, Cerrito and Sabaletas, along with several creeks and smaller streams, and the lagoon Three Americas.

=== Boundaries ===
This municipality is bordered by Guacari and Ginebra to the North, by Chaparral in the Department of Tolima on the East, Palmira to the south and by Vijes to the West.

=== Precinct and districts ===
Their townships are: Santa Elena, El Placer, San Antonio, Santa Luisa, El Pomo, El Castillo, El Moral, El Carrizal, Aují, Los Andes and Tenerife.

The municipal seat is divided into neighborhoods San Rafael, Santa Bárbara, Chapinero, Buenos Aires, Eduardo Cabal Molina, La Estrella, El Rosario, Sagrado Corazón, Álvaro Navia Prado, El Cincuentenario, La Esperanza, Sajonia, Pueblito Valluno, Coincer, Villa del Carmen, Los Samanes, Villa Cariño, Villa La Paz, Brisas de la Merced (El Teatrino), Nuevo Amanecer and El Porvenir.

== Climate ==
Climate data for El Cerrito (Tenerife), elevation 2,609 m (8,560 ft), (1981–2010)
Month	Jan	Feb	Mar	Apr	May	Jun	Jul	Aug	Sep	Oct	Nov	Dec	Year
Mean daily maximum °C (°F)	17.6 (63.7)	17.8 (64.0)	17.8 (64.0)	17.7 (63.9)	17.7 (63.9)	17.8 (64.0)	18.1 (64.6)	18.3 (64.9)	18.2 (64.8)	17.7 (63.9)	16.9 (62.4)	16.8 (62.2)	17.7 (63.9)
Daily mean °C (°F)	13.4 (56.1)	13.5 (56.3)	13.7 (56.7)	13.8 (56.8)	13.9 (57.0)	13.9 (57.0)	13.8 (56.8)	13.9 (57.0)	13.7 (56.7)	13.5 (56.3)	13.3 (55.9)	13.3 (55.9)	13.6 (56.5)
Mean daily minimum °C (°F)	9.7 (49.5)	9.8 (49.6)	10.0 (50.0)	10.4 (50.7)	10.5 (50.9)	10.3 (50.5)	10.1 (50.2)	10.0 (50.0)	10.0 (50.0)	9.9 (49.8)	9.9 (49.8)	9.7 (49.5)	10.0 (50.0)
Average precipitation mm (inches)	95.6 (3.76)	80.2 (3.16)	123.3 (4.85)	135.6 (5.34)	108.6 (4.28)	55.1 (2.17)	41.0 (1.61)	42.6 (1.68)	72.1 (2.84)	168.0 (6.61)	158.1 (6.22)	129.7 (5.11)	1,209.8 (47.63)
Average precipitation days	14	14	18	20	20	15	14	13	14	21	22	19	201
Average relative humidity (%)	85	84	84	85	85	83	80	78	81	84	87	86	84
Mean monthly sunshine hours	155.0	124.2	120.9	96.0	105.4	123.0	139.5	139.5	120.0	108.5	99.0	127.1	1,458.1
Mean daily sunshine hours	5.0	4.4	3.9	3.2	3.4	4.1	4.5	4.5	4.0	3.5	3.3	4.1	4.0
Source: Instituto de Hidrologia Meteorologia y Estudios Ambientales

== A brief history ==
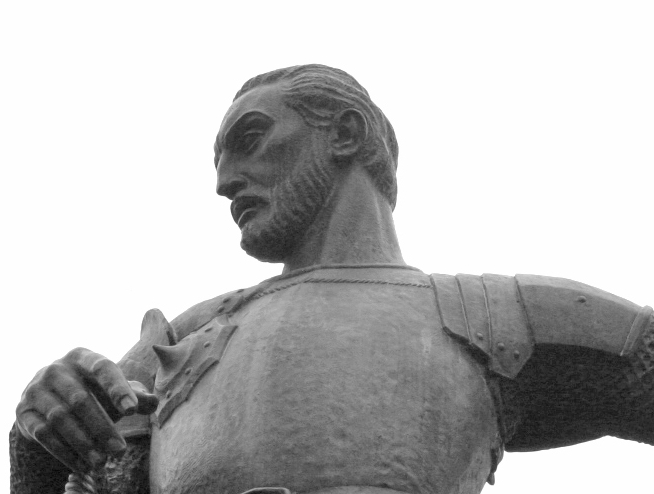
Statue of Sebastián de Belalcázar in Cali.

Sebastián de Belalcázar and his troops conquered this territory, that was populated by Native Pijaos, who, under the command of cacique Calarcá, were submitted by the Europeans.

An important figure in the era of conquest is Maria Luisa de la Espada, who was born in Canton Buga. Daughter of a Spaniard, she inherited the family's trust, writing a story and legend of charm that attracts thousands of tourists to walk the roads that climb to the district of Tenerife to visit the many houses on the road and the ruins of her castle.

In the region of Guazábara -where the Amerindians worshiped the tree "Totujandi"- Captain Gregorio de Astigarreta built the hacienda San Jerónimo de los Ingenios, that was placed in jurisdiction of Guacari county, and where the village originally settled in 1797. The Cabildo of Cali created Pantanillo county with jurisdiction between the rivers Las Guabas and Nima, and in 1821 it was transferred to the Canton of Buga, then it was finally moved to the land that was donated by ladies Petrona and Sebastiana Cárdenas.

The first Mass was offered by Father Manuel José Guzmán on August 30, 1825 and the place was named San Jerónimo. By Ordinance No. 21 of October 14, 1854 of the Legislature of Cauca, declared the creation of a district named Guzmán, as homage to the forementioned priest. The Ordinance of August 30, 1864 upgraded the district to a municipal district under the name of El Cerrito.

== Economy ==
Its main economic activities are cattle breeding (especially the processing of leather) and agriculture (grapes, sugar cane, corn, soybeans, rice, millet, beans, peppers and tropical flowers like orchids).

El Cerrito is also the main producer of 'Panderitos' baked goods produced with the flour of the cassava root.

Special mention also deserve the furniture manufacturing -especially in wood-, fruit crops and the promotion of tourism in hotels and restaurants in the mainly rural area. The cliffs of the area attract many tourists keen on extreme sports and tourism of exploration.

== Events ==
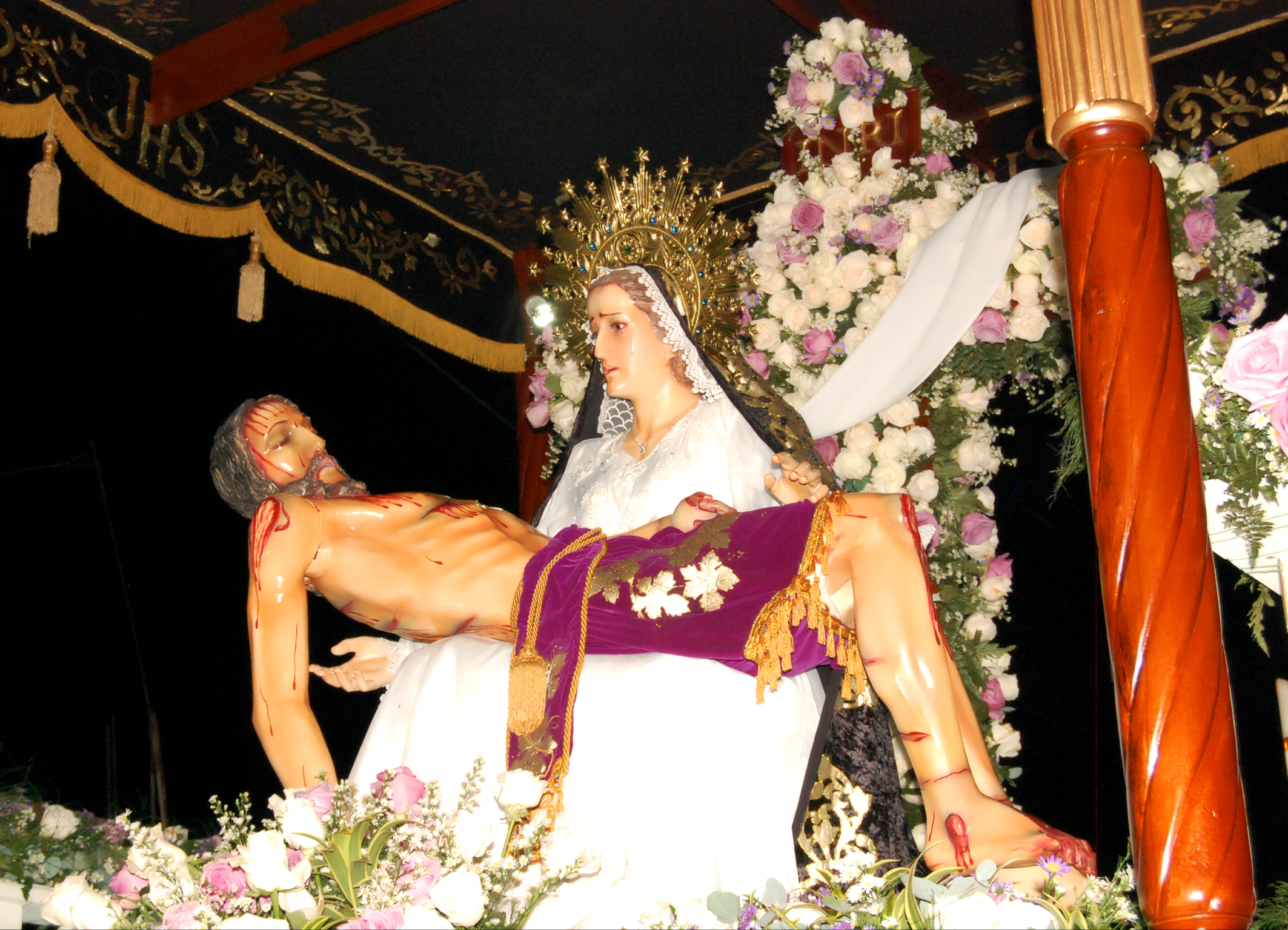
Procession of Holy Friday in El Cerrito

- Onion Festival in the village of Tenerife during August.
- Peasant's Festivities in the village of Auji, with the traditional child reign (July).
- Holy Week (traditional).
- Anniversary fairs.
- Grape's Festival in the village of Santa Elena.
- Blacks and Whites' Day in the village of El Placer.
- Kite contests during July and August.
- Celebrations in Honor of the Our Lady of Chiquinquirá.
- Isaacsian Culture Festival Held by the Universitas Foundation Cultural Center (Casa de la Cultura).

== Attractions for tourism ==
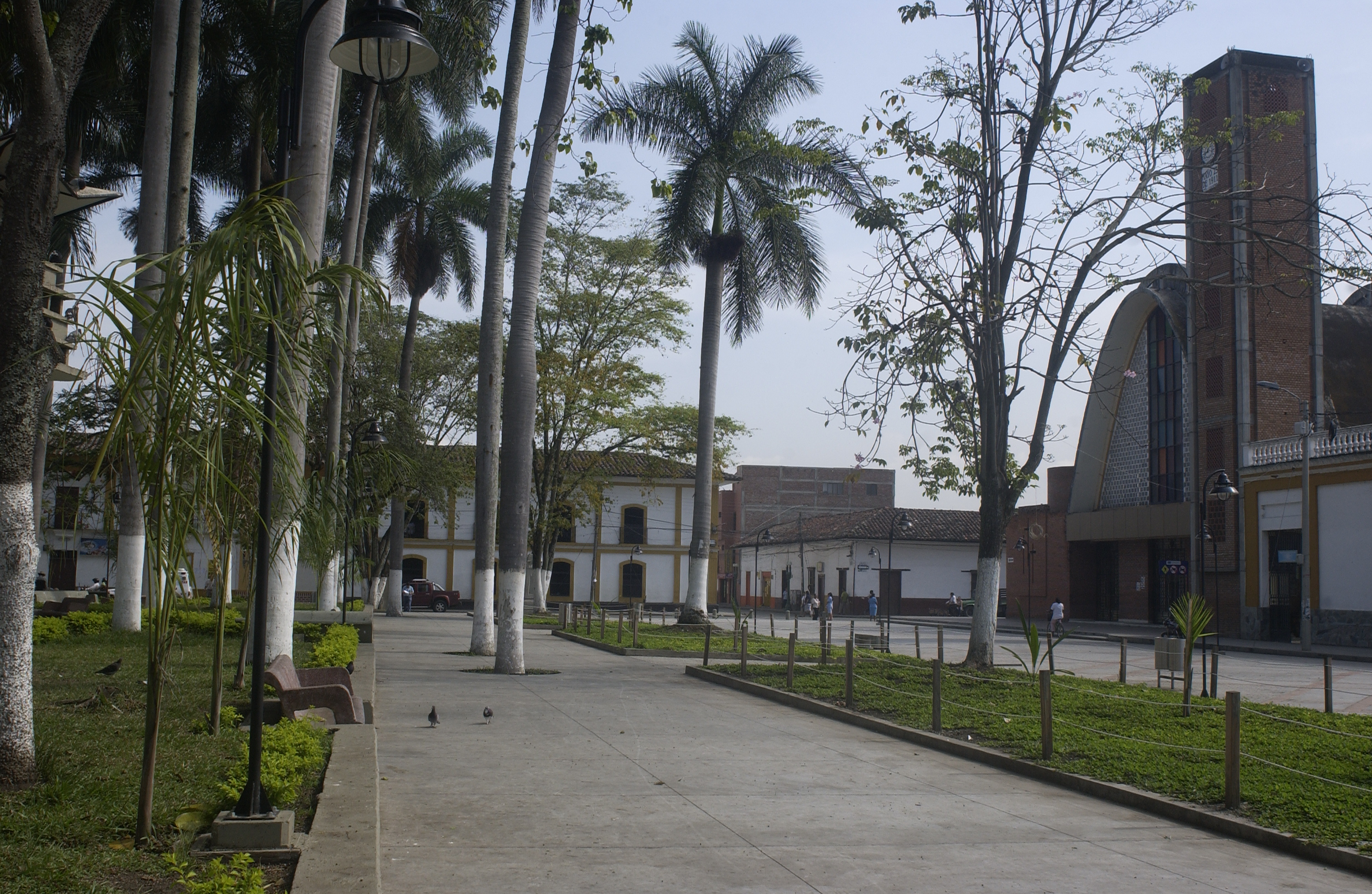
Parque Francisco Antonio Rada

Many colonial country properties (haciendas in Spanish) have great historical value, such as: El Albión, Trejitos, La Merced, La María, La Cruz, El Paraíso, Piedechinche, La Concepción, Novillero, La Argelia, La Aurora, San Miguel, Trapiche de San Fernando, El Hatico, Milán, El Trejo, Villa Mercedes and San Joaquín.

- Casa Cural.
- Education Center "Pedro Antonio Molina".
- Education See "María Inmaculada".
- "El Trincho" bridge.
- Outdoors Theatre «Marina Arango».
- Hotel Club "El Paraíso".
- Ancient House of the Colegio "Jorge Isaacs".
- Universitas Cultural Center
- Railroad station and plazoleta (small square) Santa Bárbara.
- Municipal Football stadium «Alfredo Vásquez Cobo»
- Park "Francisco Antonio Rada"
- Former hospital's gate and cemetery.
- Gallery.

== Infrastructure and transport ==
=== Roads ===
A road system connects El Cerrito with neighboring towns: Buga, Rozo (Palmira) and Costa Rica (Ginebra). It also has internal roads connecting with Ginebra.

== Religion ==
=== Catholic parishes in the Roman Catholic Church ===
The three parishes of El Cerrito belong to the diocese of Palmira: the parish of Our Lady of Chiquinquirá, established by the founding of El Cerrito, the parish of Perpetual Help, founded July 16, 1990, and the Lord of Mercy Parish, established November 8, 2000.

== Other jurisdictions ==
It belongs also to the Judicial District of Cali, the Circle of Registry and Notary in Buga, and the electoral district of Valle del Cauca; it also holds a Notary Circle.

== Tourism ==
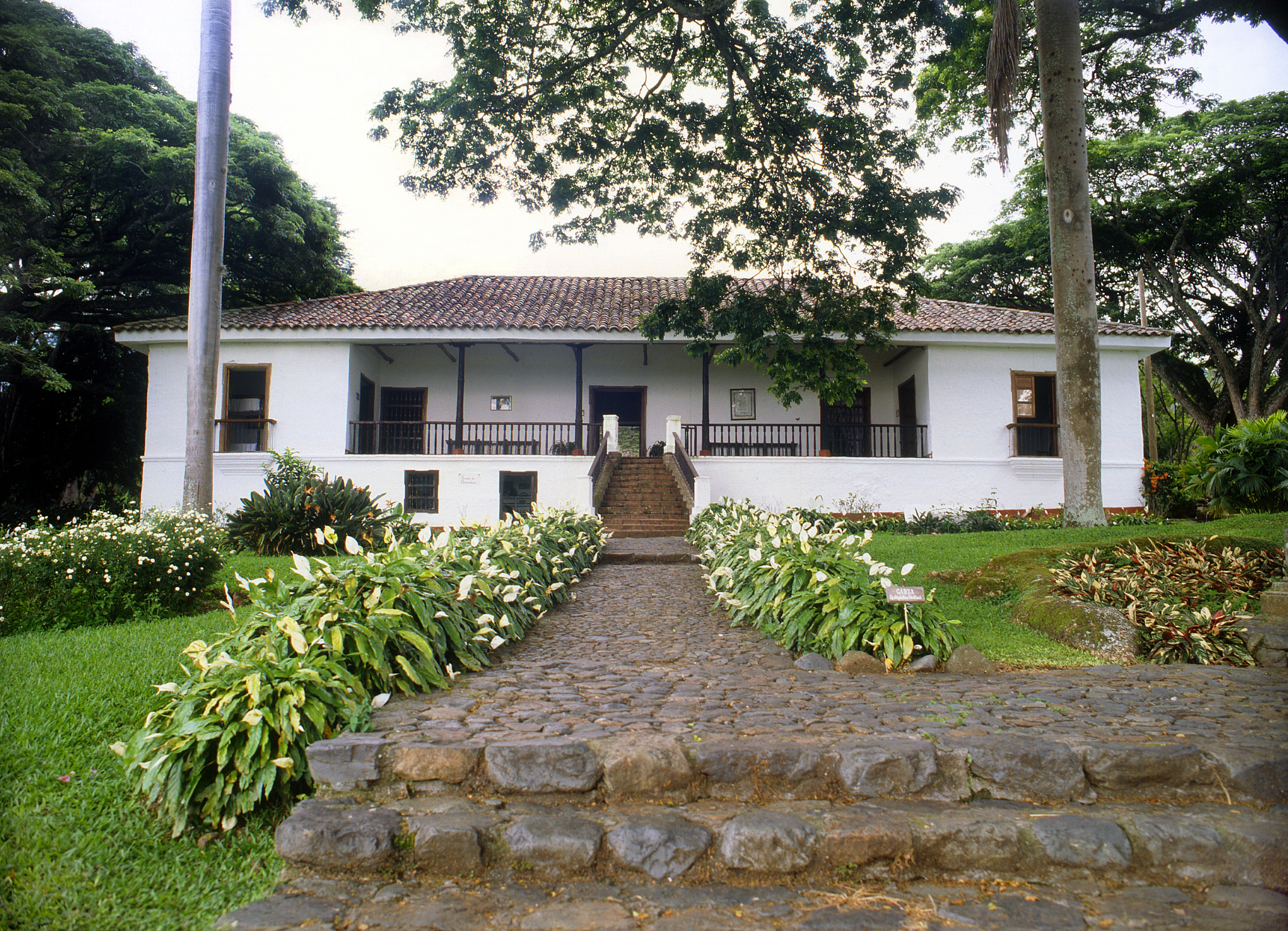
Hacienda el Paraiso

- Hacienda de El Paraíso (16 km from the municipal seat, on the road to Santa Elena, El Pomo and El Castillo, in the Cordillera Central). This is the place described in the novel María, by Jorge Isaacs (1867) and has become the most important tourist destination. From its name comes the name "Territorio Paraiso", used to refer to the tourist area between Guacari, Ginebra, El Cerrito and Palmira. It is located in the ski area called "Paseo de la olla" where you can also practice extreme sports like paragliding, mountain biking, horse riding and canoeing.
- National Day of the Onion in Tenerife. It is one of the most famous and beautiful festivals and is considered as the "agricultural exemption of Valle del Cauca". You can admire palm wax as high as 70 meters.
- The museum of sugar cane, which is part of the Hacienda Piedechinche, in the town center. The House of Piedechinche hacienda, built in the eighteenth century, is a typical demonstration of vallecaucana colonial architecture. The furniture and furnishings of the nineteenth century and the beginning of the twentieth century, acquired from different collections in the country, are characteristic of an ancient house. This area of the department of Valle del Cauca was the cradle of the first sugar mills that gave rise to industry.
- The Farmer's Celebration in Ajui. It is a rural community celebration, made in the district of Auji as part of celebrations for the Our Lady of Carmen. It displays a great cultural and festive variety, and it spreads the community's values in events like the "Reinado infantil campesino" (child's peasant kingship).

=== Project Territorio Paraíso ===
It is a Government's project that includes the expansion of roads, legal and economic incentives for the development of tourism in the municipalities of Guacara, Ginebra, El Cerrito and Palmira.

== Gastronomy ==
Among the dishes we can find the arroz atollado, sancocho, pandebono and empanada.

Among the desserts we may find the sponge cake and the blancmange.

There are many varieties of fruit including grapes, chontaduro (fruit of the palm Bactris gasipaes), mangoes, bananas, oranges, papayas, medlar and caimos (Pouteria caimito).

== People from El Cerrito ==
=== Independence Period ===
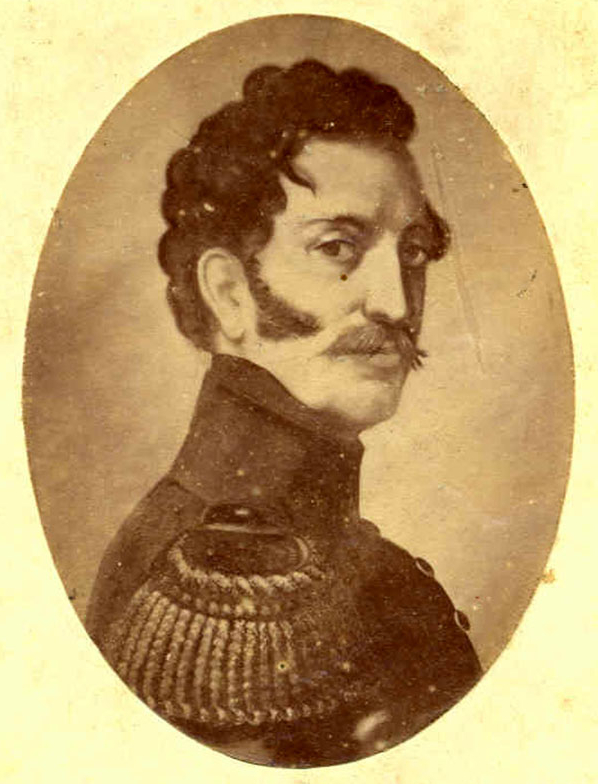
José María Cabal

- José María Cabal (general during the War of Independence of Nueva Granada) born in the hacienda de la Concepción del Alisal, El Cerrito on 25 May 1769 (when it belonged to the canton of Buga, which is why he is honored to Buga). He participated with Antonio Nariño in the enactment of Human Rights, and for this case he was confined to Europe. He fought against Juan Samano in Cauca, defending the city of Popayán, won the battle of Río Palo, in the municipality of Caloto, Cauca. Later he returned to his hacienda, where he was captured and transferred to Popayán; there he was shot on the main square, 19 August 1816.
- María Antonia Ruiz, the "black heroine", grown on the hacienda of San Agustín; after the beginning of the independence movements, she vowed to Colonel Joaquín Riascos that she would give his life if necessary for freedom. When the Royalist troops led by Simón Muñoz came to the hacienda, María Antonia went with a group of soldiers armed with a drum and a battle trumpet, shouting: "Long live the Motherland," "Long live the victorious Army of Boyacá!" "Long live the Free Cauca." Muñoz -who thought it was the whole Republican Army- then withdrew to Bermúdez Tulu. Thanks to this heroic act, Simón Bolívar himself visited her in her hacienda in San Agustín.
- The History also mentions the names of José Julián Arango Ruiz and José Toribio Arango Ruiz.

=== Twentieth century ===
- Francisco Antonio Campo: Catholic priest of the town.
- Francisco Antonio Rada: Catholic priest of the town.
- Henry Nieto Navia (July 2, 1945 - May 22, 2007), son of Alfredo Nieto G. and Rosa E. Navia Varón, he completed his studies in El Cerrito, Valle Central Gymnasium (Buga), and in the Santiago de Cali University (Cali). He obtained his law degree in 1970, and he practiced as a judge in Buenaventura. Being a founding member of Universitas Cultural Center (May 22, 1966), he remained active until his death. He was ordained a priest on November 27, 1982 and served as parish priest of Santa Elena (the district of El Cerrito), Candelaria, the parish of San Cayetano and the Cathedral of Our Lady of the Rosary of Palmar in Palmira. Devout of the Lord of Divine Mercy, promoted this devotion to implement the children's procession during Holy Week in Palmira and created some groups of apostolate and secular work. He made his humanitarian work mainly in Tumaco, Nariño.
- Álvaro Domínguez, footballer.
- Jefferson Lerma, footballer.

== Bibliography ==
- Mi Valle del Cauca – El Tiempo
- Así es Colombia - Los Municipios - El Espectador
- Procerato Caucano, Gobernación del Valle 1964 78 -80 y 105 -107
- El Cerrito, Ciudad Cariño Ayer y Hoy “La tierra del Paraíso” Carlos Franco Vallejo
- Boletín de la Academia de Historia del Valle del Cauca, Dic 1967 pág
- "María". Jorge Isaacs Ferrer
- New Granada. Twenty Months in the Andes, Capítulo XX a Buga y Palmira, publicado en 1857, Mister Isaac F. Holton
- Guía de Rutas por Colombia, Puntos Suspensivos editores. 2007
