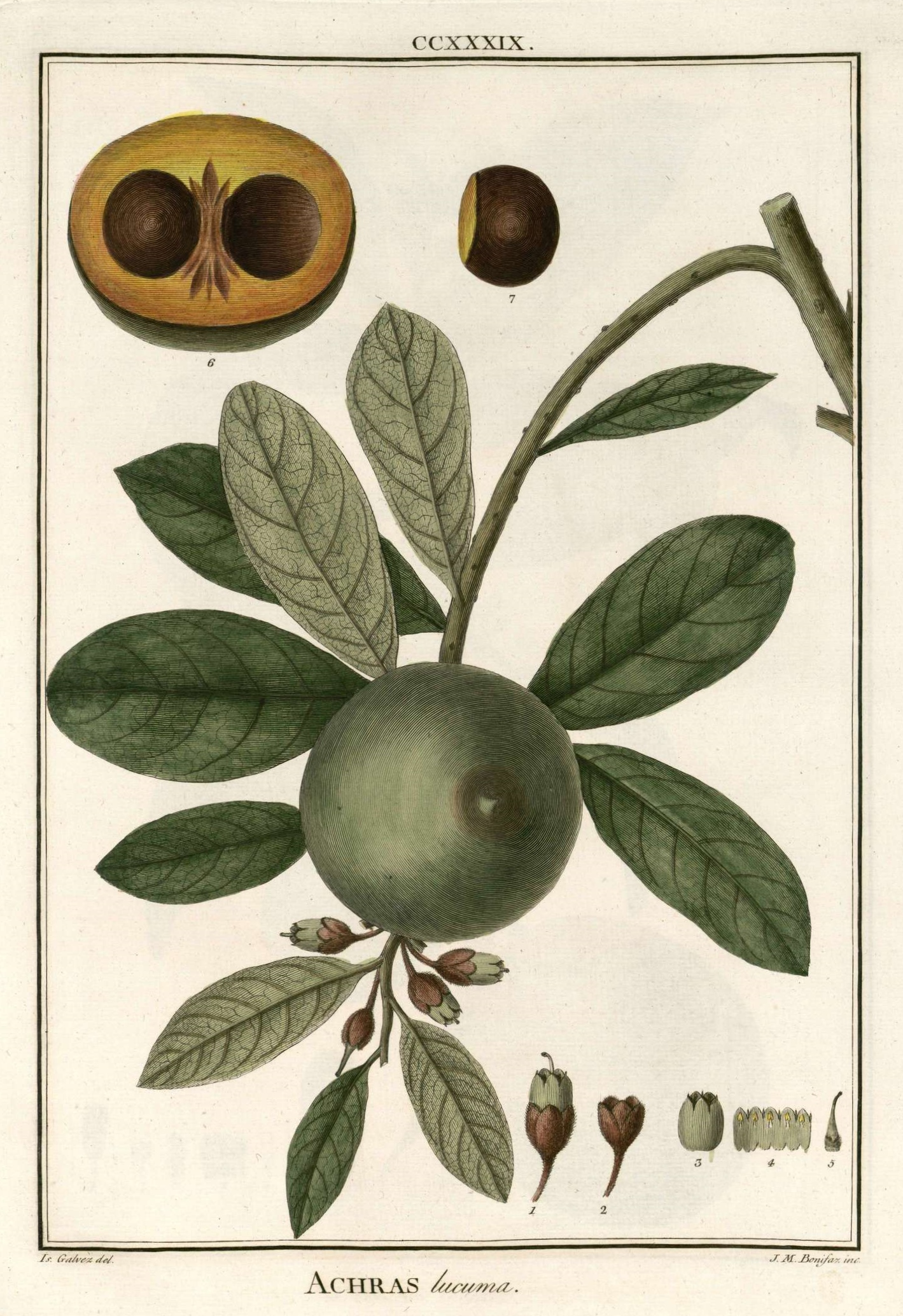
- Branchlet with leaves, flowers and fruit of Lucuma bifera: Fruit cut in half shown on top left of image

Conservation status
- Least Concern (IUCN 3.1)

Scientific classification
- Kingdom: Plantae
- Clade: Tracheophytes
- Clade: Angiosperms
- Clade: Eudicots
- Clade: Asterids
- Order: Ericales
- Family: Sapotaceae
- Genus: Lucuma
- Species: L. bifera

Binomial name
- Lucuma bifera Molina

Synonyms
- List: Achras lucuma Ruiz & Pav.; Lucuma obovata Kunth; Lucuma obovata var. ruizii A.DC.; Lucuma biflora J.F.Gmel.; Lucuma obovata Kunth; Lucuma obovata var. ruizii A.DC.; Lucuma peruviana J.St.-Hil.; Lucuma turbinata Molina, tentatively listed as a synonym; Pouteria insignis Baehni; Pouteria lucuma (Ruiz & Pav.) Kuntze; Richardella lucuma (Ruiz & Pav.) Aubrév.

= Lucuma bifera =

Lúcuma

Species of plant

Lucuma bifera (synonym Pouteria lucuma) is a species of tree in the family Sapotaceae cultivated for its fruit, the lúcuma. It is native to the Andean valleys of South America.

== Description ==
This evergreen tree is up to 20 metres (66 feet) tall and has grayish-brown, fissured bark, which produces a milky white exudate. The end of branchlets and the petioles are covered with short, brown hairs. The leaves are simple, oblanceolate to elliptical, up to 25 centimetres (10 inches) long and 10 cm (4 in) wide, and glabrous (or sometimes slightly hairy on the underside) grouped at the end of the branches.

The flowers are solitary or in fascicles, small, axillary, with hairy sepals and a corolla forming a tube 1–1.8 cm (3/8–3/4 in) long, greenish white, with five lobes, five stamens, five staminodes, a pubescent ovary, and a style 0.8–1.5 cm (3/8–5/8 in) long. The fruit is globose, 6–12 cm (2 1/4–4 3/4 in) long, glabrous, and russet to yellow when mature; the pulp is bright yellow; the one to several seeds are 1.8–3.5 cm (3/4–1 3/8 in) long, dark brown, and glossy.

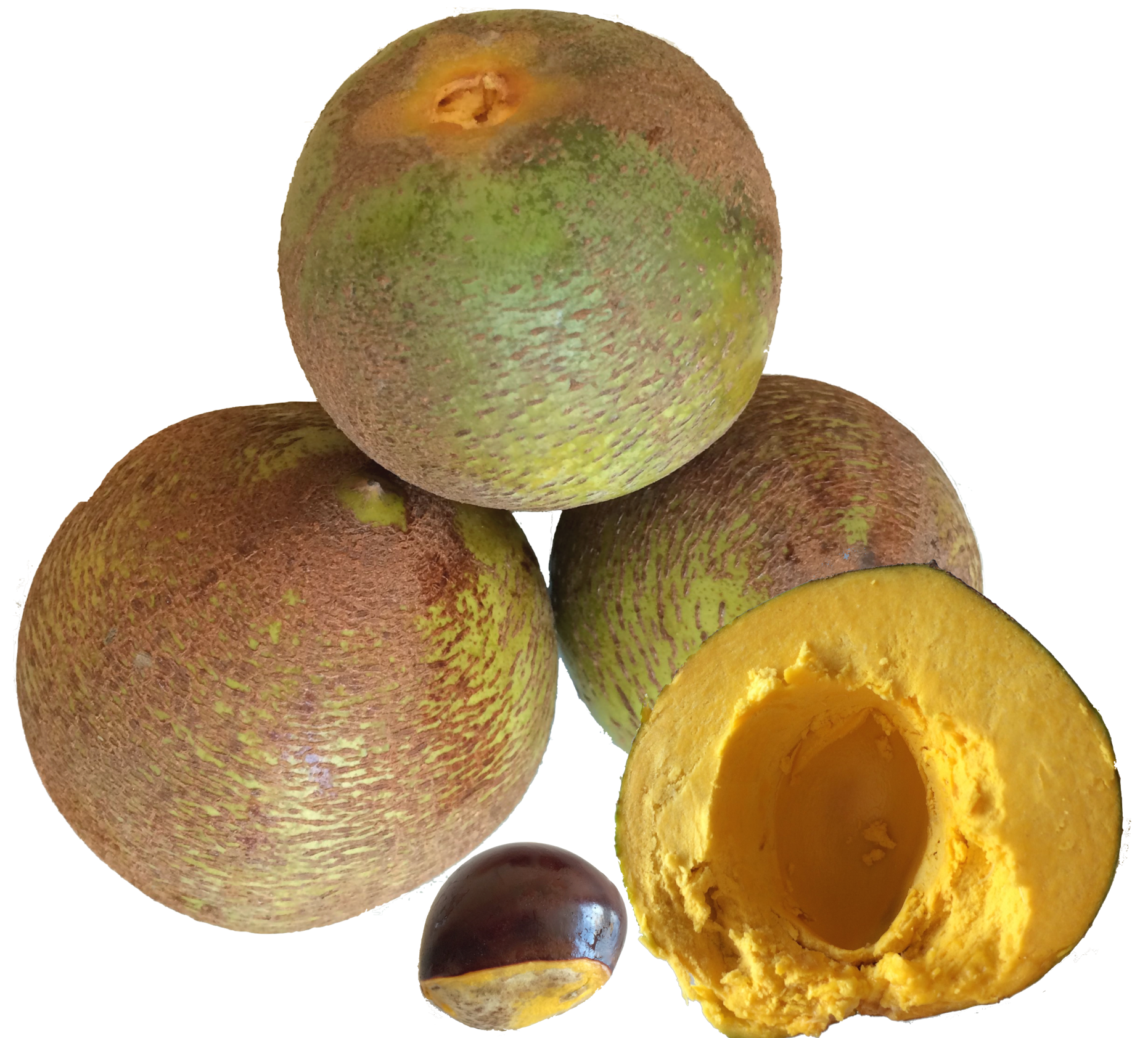
Lúcumas

== Distribution and habitat ==
L. bifera is native to the Andean valleys of Colombia, Ecuador, Peru, Bolivia, and northern Chile, at temperate elevations of 2,700–3,000 m (8,900–9,800 ft).

Europeans first reported seeing the fruit in Ecuador in 1531.

== Cultivation ==
In addition to Peru, the fruit is grown also to a limited extent in Bolivia, Chile, and Costa Rica. Attempts at growing lúcuma in Florida's climate are typically not successful. The fruit is successfully grown in Vietnam, where it is known as lêkima.

In Peru, harvesting season is from October to March and in Chile from June to November.

Lucuma
Nutritional value per 100 g (3.5 oz)
- Energy: 414.5 kJ (99.1 kcal)
- Carbohydrates: 1.5 %
- Dietary fiber: 1.3 %
- Fat: 0.5 %
- Protein: 1.5 %
Vitamins and minerals
Vitamins	Quantity %DV^{†}
Vitamin A	2.3 IU
Thiamine (B1)	1% 0.01 mg
Riboflavin (B2)	11% 0.14 mg
Niacin (B3)	12% 1.96 mg
Vitamin C	2% 2.2 mg
Minerals	Quantity %DV^{†}
Calcium	1% 16 mg
Iron	2% 0.4 mg
Phosphorus	2% 26 mg
Potassium	16% 470 mg
Sodium	0% 6 mg
- Other constituents: Quantity
- Water: 64.8 - 72.3 %
- ^{†}Percentages estimated using US recommendations for adults, except for potassium, which is estimated based on expert recommendation from the National Academies.

== Uses ==
Lúcuma pulp has a 64–72% moisture content. The pulp also contains glucose, fructose, sucrose, inositol, citric acid, and succinic acid.

When eaten raw, the very sweet fruit is bright yellow and has a mealy and dry texture. In Peru, it is more commonly used as a flavor in juice, milkshakes, and especially ice cream. Its flavor in such preparations has been described variously as being similar to sweet potato, maple syrup, or butterscotch. In Peru, manjar de lúcuma (dulce de leche with lúcuma purée) is a dessert. Multiple sources describe it as the most popular ice cream flavor in Peru and one of the most popular fresh fruits.

== In culture ==
Representations of lúcuma have been found on ceramics at burial sites of the indigenous people of coastal Peru. The Moche people had a fascination with agriculture and often chose to represent fruits and vegetables, including lúcuma, in their art.

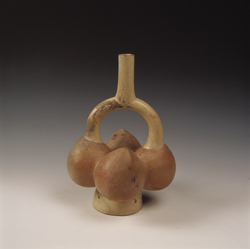
Moche culture pottery representing lucumas
