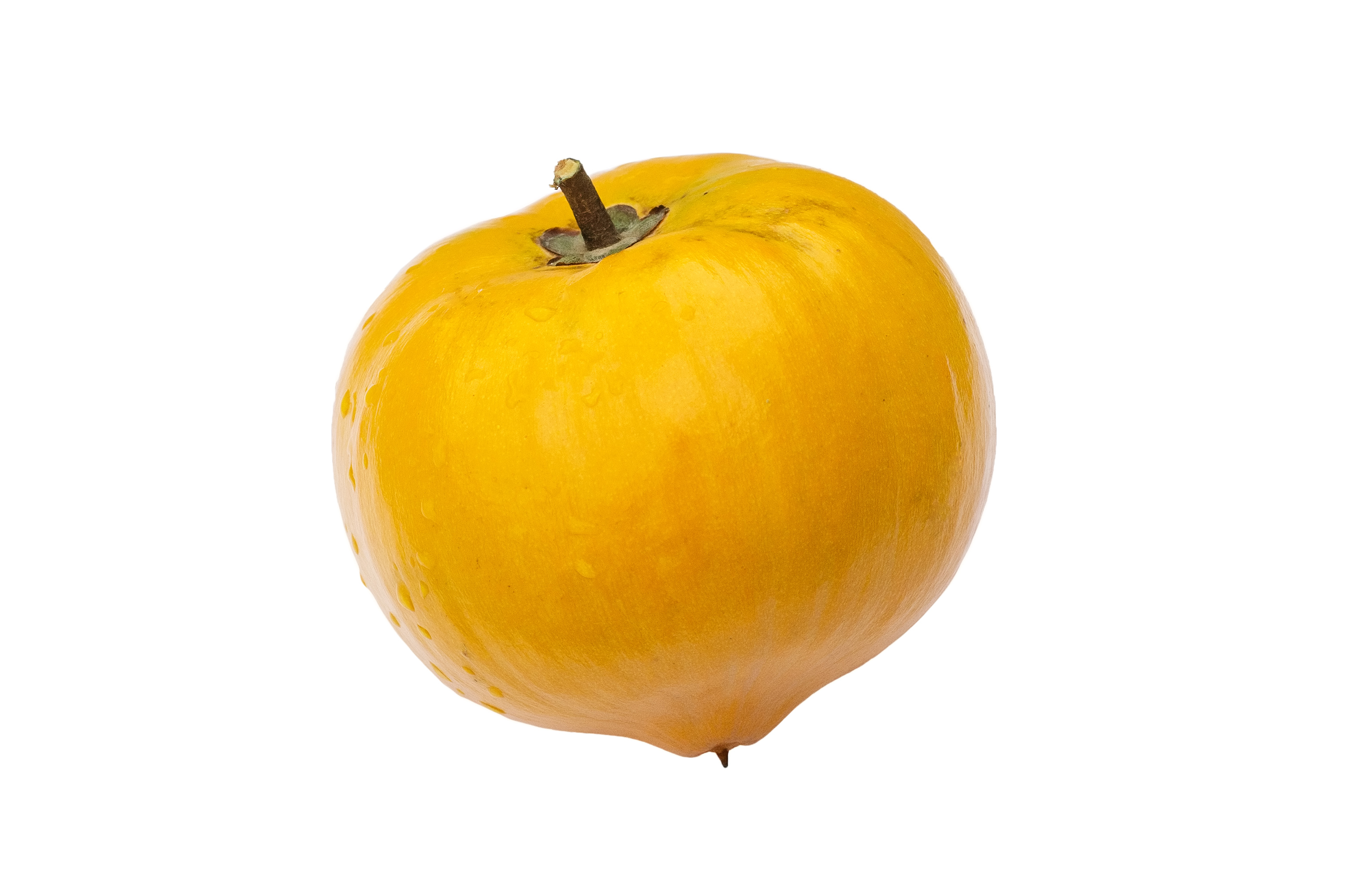
- Whole fruit
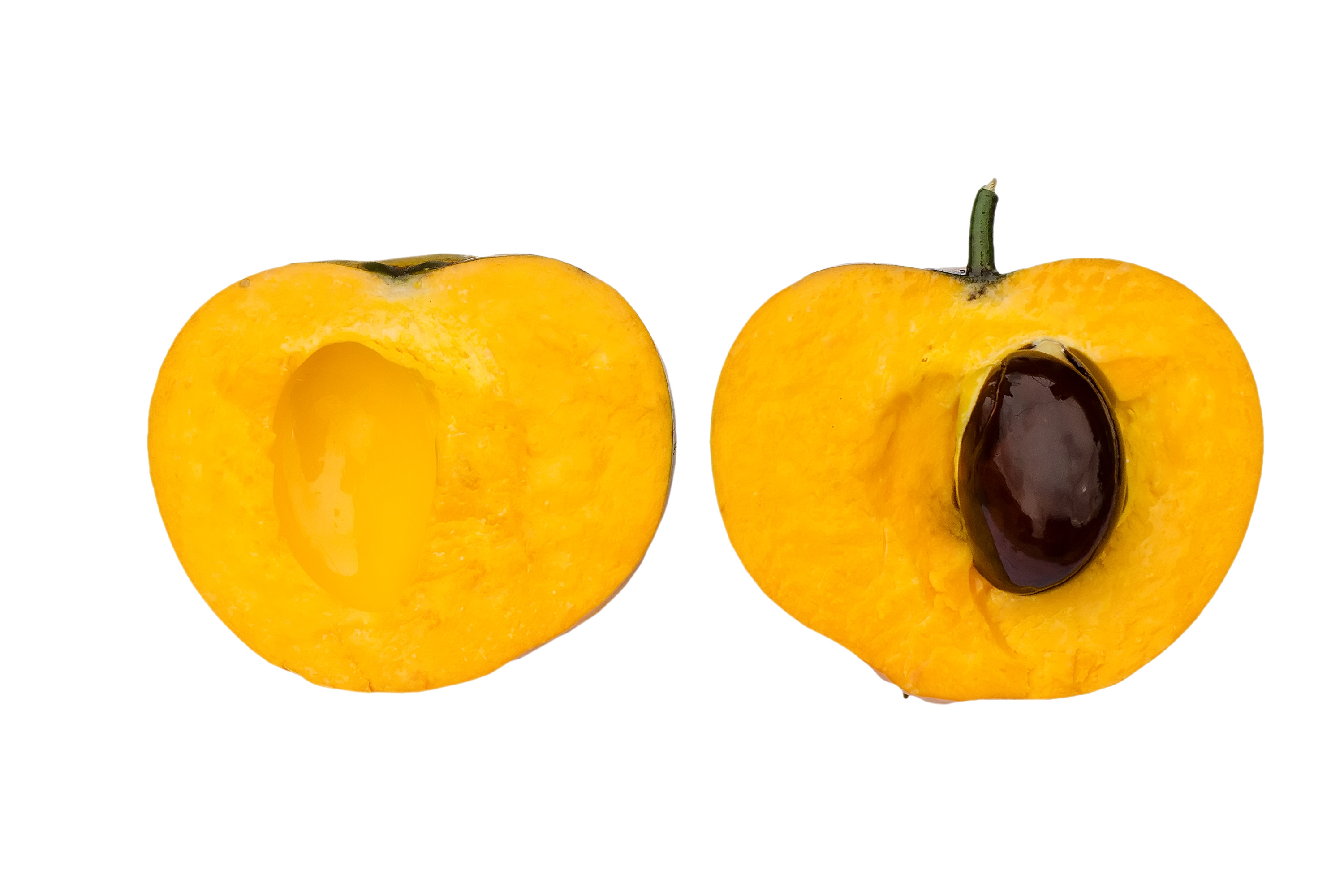
- Fruit cross section

Conservation status
- Least Concern (IUCN 3.1)

Scientific classification
- Kingdom: Plantae
- Clade: Embryophytes
- Clade: Tracheophytes
- Clade: Angiosperms
- Clade: Eudicots
- Clade: Asterids
- Order: Ericales
- Family: Sapotaceae
- Genus: Pouteria
- Species: P. campechiana

Binomial name
- Pouteria campechiana Kunth

Synonyms
- Lucuma campechiana; Richardella campechiana (Kunth) Pierre; Vitellaria campechiana (Kunth) Engl.; Lucuma nervosa A.DC.; Lucuma salicifolia Knuth

= Pouteria campechiana =

Canistel

Species of plant

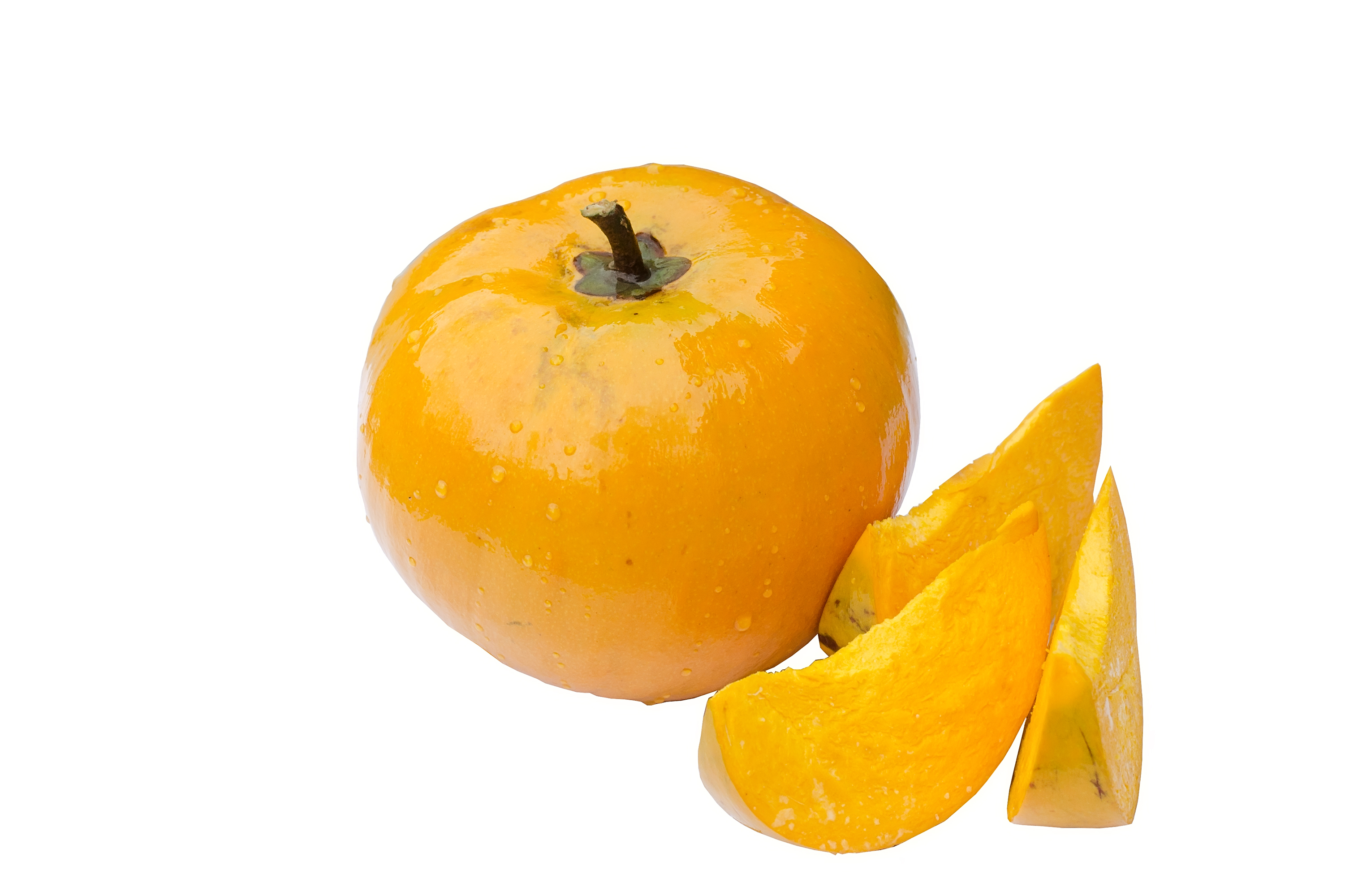
Canistel

Canistel
Nutritional value per 100 g
- Energy: 138.8 kcal (581 kJ)
- Carbohydrates: 36.69 g
- Dietary fiber: .10 g
- Fat: .13 g
- Protein: 1.68 g
Vitamins and minerals
Vitamins	Quantity %DV^{†}
Thiamine (B1)	14%.17 mg
Riboflavin (B2)	1%.01 mg
Niacin (B3)	23% 3.7 mg
Vitamin C	48% 43.00 mg
Minerals	Quantity %DV^{†}
Calcium	2% 26.5 mg
Iron	5%.92 mg
Phosphorus	3% 37.3 mg
- Source: Laboratorio FIM de Nutricion in Havana

Pouteria campechiana (commonly known as the cupcake fruit, eggfruit, zapote amarillo, yellow sapote or canistel) is an evergreen tree native to, and cultivated in, southern Mexico, Belize, Guatemala, and El Salvador. It is cultivated in other countries, such as India, Costa Rica, Brazil, the United States, the Dominican Republic, Australia, Cambodia, Vietnam, Taiwan, Indonesia, Sri Lanka, Nigeria, Cameroon and the Philippines. The edible part of the tree is its fruit, which is colloquially known as an egg fruit.

The canistel grows up to 10 m (33 ft) high, and produces orange-yellow fruit up to 7 cm (3 in) long, which are edible raw. Canistel flesh is sweet, with a texture often compared to that of a hard-boiled egg yolk, hence its colloquial name "eggfruit". It is closely related to the lúcuma, mamey sapote, and abiu.

== Fruit description ==
The shape and size of the fruit is highly variable, depending on the cultivar. The better selections consistently produce large, ovate fruit with glossy skin weighing upwards of 400 g (14 oz). The flesh is somewhat pasty, although the best varieties have a creamy, mousse-like texture. The flavor is rich and is reminiscent of an egg custard. The fruit may contain one to six large, brown seeds.

The canistel is a climacteric fruit, so it continues to ripen after harvest. A fully mature fruit shows an intense yellow skin color. Eventually, it softens and drops from the tree. Insects and birds avoid the fruit, perhaps due to its astringent properties. The bitterness is perceptible to the human palate as well, though much reduced as the fruit overripens. Mature fruits harvested while hard may not ripen properly: the fruits may remain astringent and fail to develop its signature texture reminiscent of egg yolk.

== Uses ==
Like the related lúcuma, the canistel can be eaten fresh, and has the texture of a hard-boiled egg yolk. The ripe fruit can be made into jam, marmalade, pancakes, and flour. The ripe flesh is blended with milk and other ingredients to make a shake, and pureed, it is sometimes added to custards or used in making ice cream. It is also used in a milkshake known as "eggfruit nog".

The wood of the tree is occasionally used in construction where it is available, especially as planks or rafters. In its native range, it has been a source of latex used to adulterate chicle.

== Etymology ==
Its specific name is derived from the Mexican town of Campeche, where it is native.

In the numerous countries where it is cultivated or sold, it is known by many vernacular names; canistel is common, as are variations on egg fruit and names referring to its yellow color. In the Philippines, it is called chesa, tiessa, or atiesa. In Sri Lanka, this fruit is known as lavul, laulu, lavulu, or lawalu. In Thailand, it is known by different traditional popular names such as lamut Khamen (ละมุดเขมร="Khmer sapodilla") or tho Khamen (ท้อเขมร="Khmer peach"), folk imagination attributing a hypothetical Cambodian origin to this fruit (the name of the fruit is see da in Cambodia). Currently, those names are discouraged by linguistic authorities and names making no reference to Cambodia, such as tiesa (ทิสซา), are officially favored.

The fruit is also given names after its unique yellow colour similar to an egg yolk: it is known as the buah kuning telur ("yolk fruit") in Malay, cây trứng gà ("chicken egg plant") in Vietnamese, mon khai (ม่อนไข่, khai meaning "egg") in Thai, and danhuang guo (蛋黃果 "egg yolk fruit") in Taiwan.

It is called sawo mentega ("butter sapodilla", for its color and texture) throughout Southeast Asia. It is also known as alkesah in Indonesia.

Though relatively rare in East Africa, they can be found, and in the Swahili language, the fruit is confusingly named zaituni, which is the same word used to refer to olives.

The Taiwanese also call this fruit xiantao (仙桃), "peach of the immortals".

== Plant gallery ==
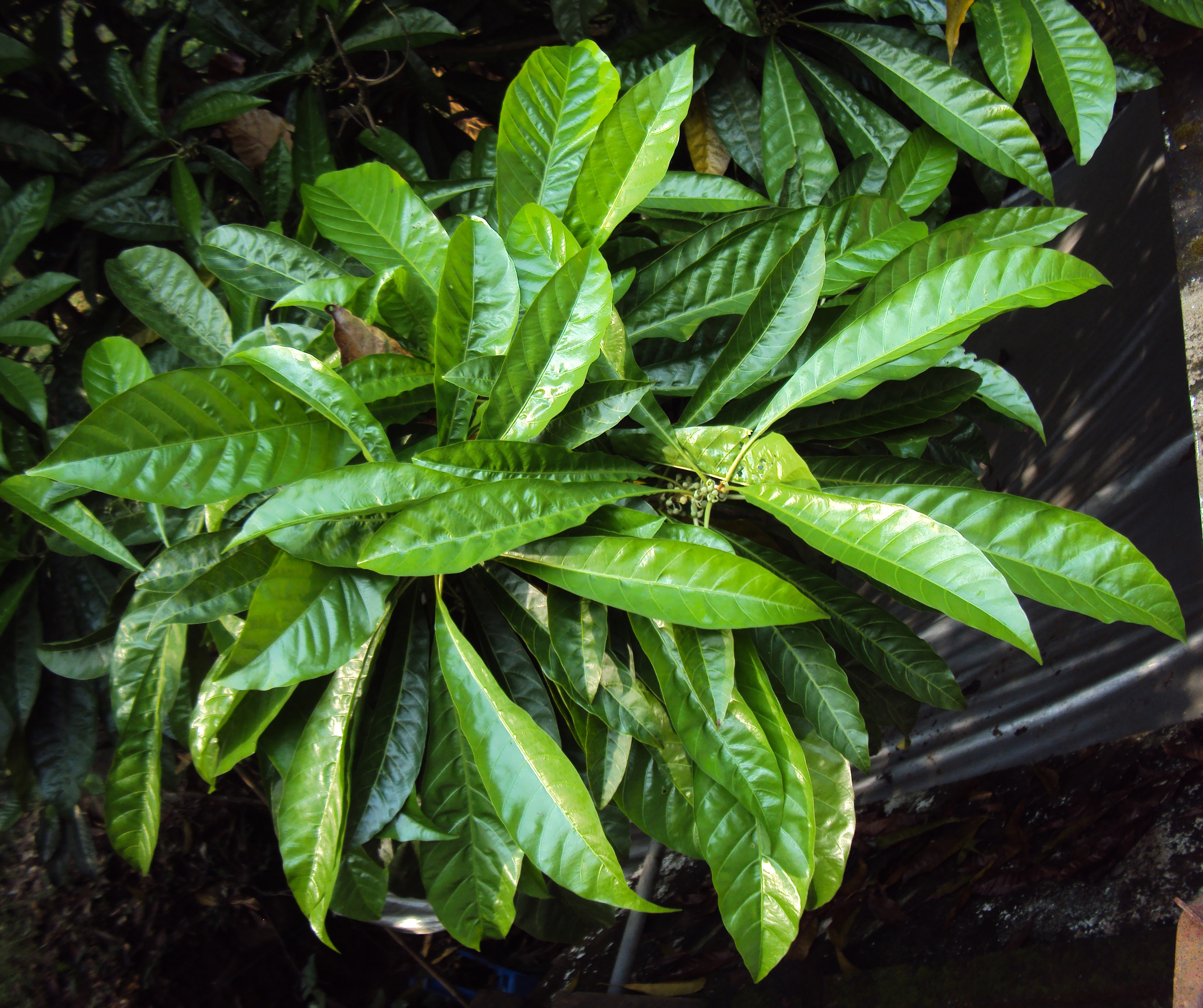
Leaves

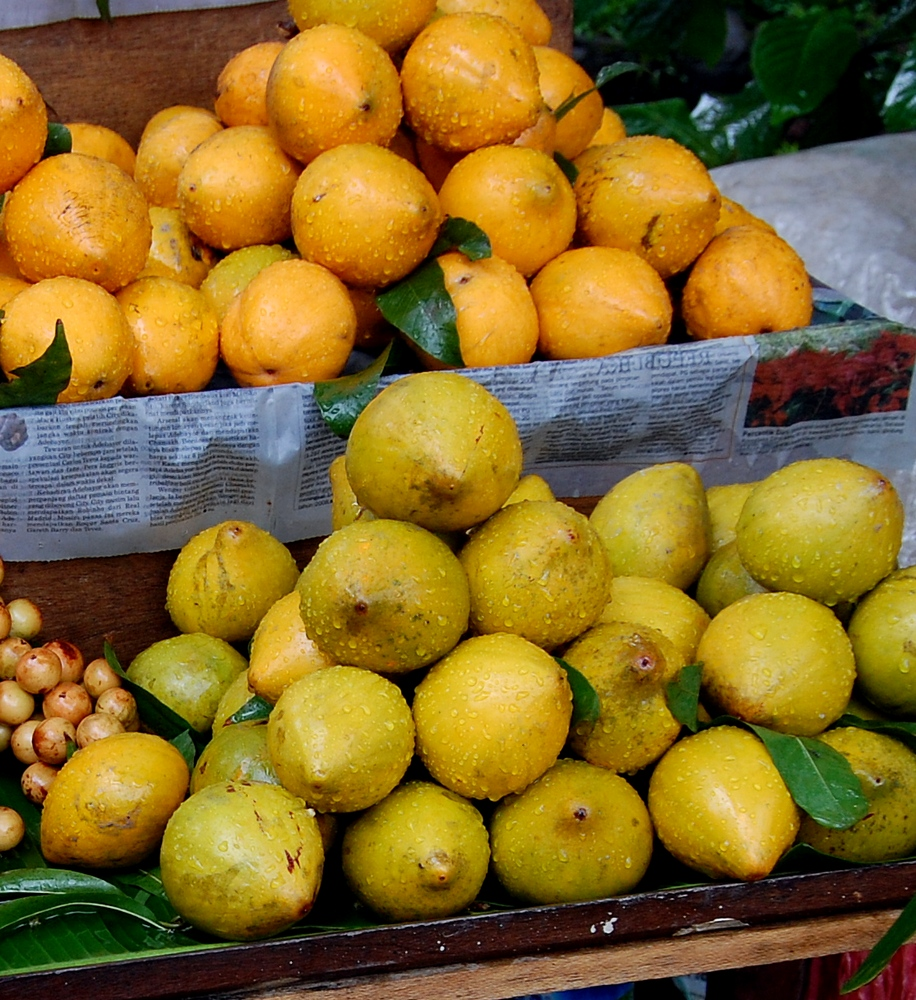
Fruits at a local market

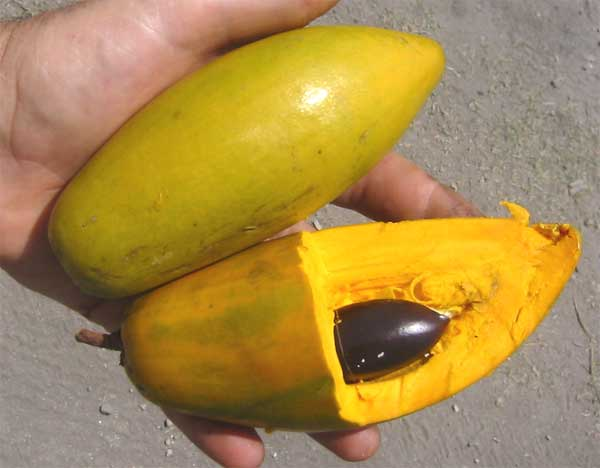
Fruits of a different shape

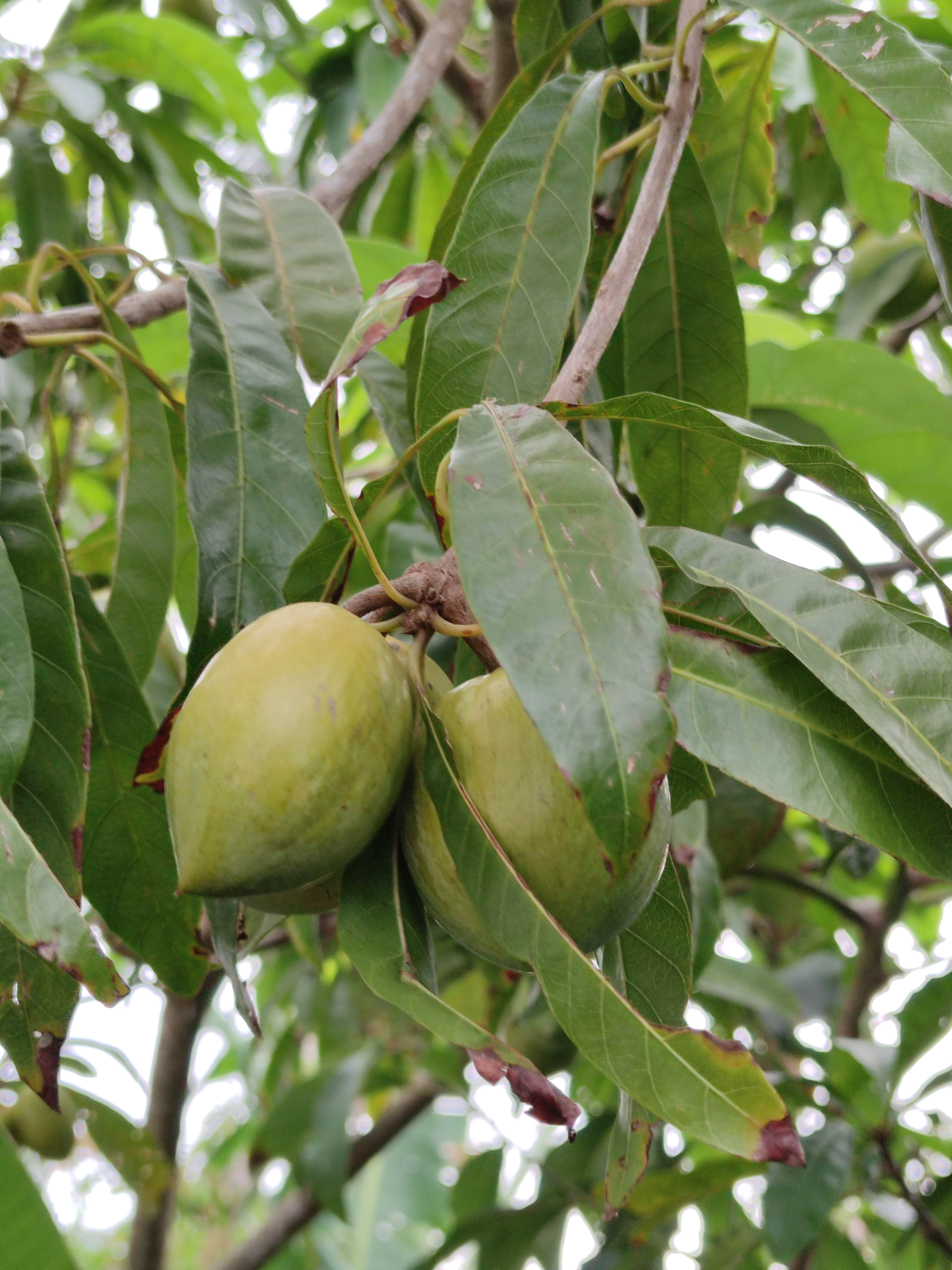
Egg fruit
