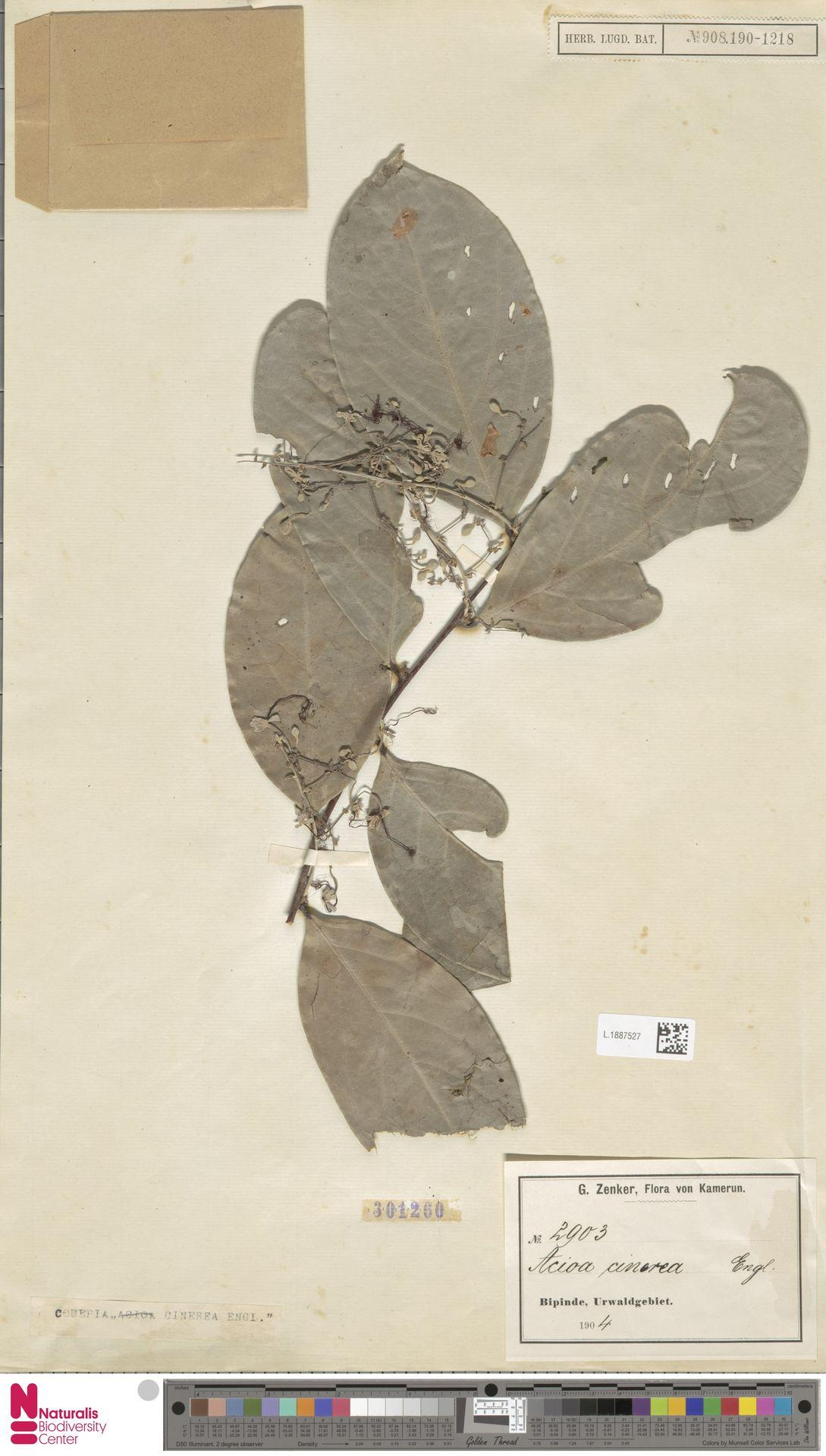
- Dactyladenia cinerea (Engl. ex De Wild.) Prance & F.White, isotype herbarium specimen

Conservation status
- Endangered (IUCN 3.1)

Scientific classification
- Kingdom: Plantae
- Clade: Tracheophytes
- Clade: Angiosperms
- Clade: Eudicots
- Clade: Rosids
- Order: Malpighiales
- Family: Chrysobalanaceae
- Genus: Dactyladenia
- Species: D. cinerea

Binomial name
- Dactyladenia cinerea (Engl. ex De Wild.) Prance & F.White

Synonyms
- Acioa cinerea De Wild. ex Engl.

= Dactyladenia cinerea =

Species of flowering plant

Dactyladenia cinerea is a species of plant in the family Chrysobalanaceae. It is endemic to Cameroon. It is threatened by habitat loss.
