= Dactyladenia laevis =

Conservation status
- Endangered (IUCN 3.1)

Scientific classification
- Kingdom: Plantae
- Clade: Tracheophytes
- Clade: Angiosperms
- Clade: Eudicots
- Clade: Rosids
- Order: Malpighiales
- Family: Chrysobalanaceae
- Genus: Dactyladenia
- Species: D. laevis

Binomial name
- Dactyladenia laevis (Pierre ex De Wild.) Prance & F.White

Synonyms
- Acioa laevis Pierre ex De Wild.

Species of flowering plant

Dactyladenia laevis is a species of plant in the family Chrysobalanaceae. It is endemic to Gabon, where it is found only in the vicinity of Libreville. It is threatened by habitat loss due to extensive logging.
