= Dactyladenia dinklagei =

Conservation status
- Vulnerable (IUCN 2.3)

Scientific classification
- Kingdom: Plantae
- Clade: Tracheophytes
- Clade: Angiosperms
- Clade: Eudicots
- Clade: Rosids
- Order: Malpighiales
- Family: Chrysobalanaceae
- Genus: Dactyladenia
- Species: D. dinklagei

Binomial name
- Dactyladenia dinklagei (Engl.) Prance & F.White

Synonyms
- Acioa dinklagei Engl.

Species of flowering plant

Dactyladenia dinklagei is a species of plant in the family Chrysobalanaceae. It is endemic to Ivory Coast, Ghana and Liberia. Its natural habitats are wet evergreen forests. It is threatened by habitat loss due to mining activities, logging and commercial planting.
