= Dactyladenia dichotoma =

Conservation status
- Critically Endangered (IUCN 2.3)

Scientific classification
- Kingdom: Plantae
- Clade: Tracheophytes
- Clade: Angiosperms
- Clade: Eudicots
- Clade: Rosids
- Order: Malpighiales
- Family: Chrysobalanaceae
- Genus: Dactyladenia
- Species: D. dichotoma

Binomial name
- Dactyladenia dichotoma (De Wild.) Prance & F.White

Synonyms
- Acioa dichotoma De Wild.

Species of flowering plant

Dactyladenia dichotoma is a species of plant in the family Chrysobalanaceae. It is endemic to Nigeria. It is threatened by habitat loss.
