= Dactyladenia mannii =

Conservation status
- Endangered (IUCN 3.1)

Scientific classification
- Kingdom: Plantae
- Clade: Tracheophytes
- Clade: Angiosperms
- Clade: Eudicots
- Clade: Rosids
- Order: Malpighiales
- Family: Chrysobalanaceae
- Genus: Dactyladenia
- Species: D. mannii

Binomial name
- Dactyladenia mannii (Oliv.) Prance & F.White

Synonyms
- Acioa mannii (Oliv.) Engl.; Griffonia mannii Oliv.

Species of flowering plant

Dactyladenia mannii is a species of flowering plant in the family Chrysobalanaceae. It is a climbing shrub or small tree native to Bioko Island in Equatorial Guinea and to southwestern Cameroon. It grows in lowland and submontane forest, sometimes along rivers, up to 800 metres elevation. It is threatened by habitat loss.

The species was first described as Griffonia mannii by Daniel Oliver in 1871. In 1979 Ghillean Prance and Frank White placed the species is genus Dactyladenia as D. mannii.
