= Dactyladenia eketensis =

Conservation status
- Critically Endangered (IUCN 2.3)

Scientific classification
- Kingdom: Plantae
- Clade: Tracheophytes
- Clade: Angiosperms
- Clade: Eudicots
- Clade: Rosids
- Order: Malpighiales
- Family: Chrysobalanaceae
- Genus: Dactyladenia
- Species: D. eketensis

Binomial name
- Dactyladenia eketensis (De Wild.) Prance & F.White

Synonyms
- Acioa eketensis De Wild.

Species of flowering plant

Dactyladenia eketensis is a species of flowering plant in the family Chrysobalanaceae. It is a tree native to southern Nigeria and Gabon. The species has suffered from extensive habitat loss from oil exploration and extraction, and the IUCN Red List assesses the species as Critically Endangered.

The species was first described as Acioa eketensis by Émile Auguste Joseph De Wildeman in 1920. It is named after Eket in southeastern Nigeria, where it was discovered. In 1979 Ghillean Prance and Frank White placed it genus Dactyladenia as D. eketensis.
