= Dactyladenia hirsuta =

Conservation status
- Endangered (IUCN 2.3)

Scientific classification
- Kingdom: Plantae
- Clade: Tracheophytes
- Clade: Angiosperms
- Clade: Eudicots
- Clade: Rosids
- Order: Malpighiales
- Family: Chrysobalanaceae
- Genus: Dactyladenia
- Species: D. hirsuta

Binomial name
- Dactyladenia hirsuta (A.Chev. ex De Wild.) Prance & F.White

Synonyms
- Acioa hirsuta A.Chev. ex De Wild.

Species of flowering plant

Dactyladenia hirsuta is a species of plant in the family Chrysobalanaceae. It is endemic to Ivory Coast and Ghana. Its natural habitats are wet evergreen forests. It is threatened by extensive logging of its habitat, the effects of mining and the establishment of commercial plantations.
