= Dactyladenia johnstonei =

Conservation status
- Critically Endangered (IUCN 3.1)

Scientific classification
- Kingdom: Plantae
- Clade: Tracheophytes
- Clade: Angiosperms
- Clade: Eudicots
- Clade: Rosids
- Order: Malpighiales
- Family: Chrysobalanaceae
- Genus: Dactyladenia
- Species: D. johnstonei

Binomial name
- Dactyladenia johnstonei (Hoyle) Prance & F.White

Synonyms
- Acioa johnstonei Hoyle

Species of flowering plant

Dactyladenia johnstonei is a species of flowering plant in the family Chrysobalanaceae. It is a shrub or tree native to western Cameroon and southeastern Nigeria. In Cameroon it is found in the Mount Kupe and the Bamenda Highlands. Its natural habitats are forested valley slopes in submontane forests at elevations of 950 to 1,600 m. It is threatened by habitat loss due to logging and clearance for agricultural land.

The species was first described as Acioa johnstonei by Arthur Clague Hoyle in 1932. In 1979 Ghillean Prance and Frank White placed the species in genus Dactyladenia as D. johnstonei.
