= Moquilea longicuspidata =

Conservation status
- Endangered (IUCN 3.1)

Scientific classification
- Kingdom: Plantae
- Clade: Embryophytes
- Clade: Tracheophytes
- Clade: Angiosperms
- Clade: Eudicots
- Clade: Rosids
- Order: Malpighiales
- Family: Chrysobalanaceae
- Genus: Moquilea
- Species: M. longicuspidata

Binomial name
- Moquilea longicuspidata (Prance) Sothers & Prance

Synonyms
- Licania longicuspidata Prance

Species of flowering plant

Moquilea longicuspidata, synonym Licania longicuspidata, is a species of plant in the family Chrysobalanaceae. It is endemic to Ecuador. Its natural habitats are subtropical or tropical moist lowland forests and subtropical or tropical moist montane forests.
