= Moquilea chiriquiensis =

Conservation status
- Data Deficient (IUCN 3.1)

Scientific classification
- Kingdom: Plantae
- Clade: Embryophytes
- Clade: Tracheophytes
- Clade: Angiosperms
- Clade: Eudicots
- Clade: Rosids
- Order: Malpighiales
- Family: Chrysobalanaceae
- Genus: Moquilea
- Species: M. chiriquiensis

Binomial name
- Moquilea chiriquiensis (Prance) Sothers & Prance

Synonyms
- Licania chiriquiensis Prance

Species of flowering plant

Moquilea chiriquiensis, synonym Licania chiriquiensis, is a species of plant in the family Chrysobalanaceae. It is endemic to Panama. It is threatened by habitat loss.
