= Moquilea fasciculata =

Conservation status
- Least Concern (IUCN 3.1)

Scientific classification
- Kingdom: Plantae
- Clade: Embryophytes
- Clade: Tracheophytes
- Clade: Angiosperms
- Clade: Eudicots
- Clade: Rosids
- Order: Malpighiales
- Family: Chrysobalanaceae
- Genus: Moquilea
- Species: M. fasciculata

Binomial name
- Moquilea fasciculata (Prance) Sothers & Prance

Synonyms
- Licania fasciculata Prance

Species of flowering plant

Moquilea fasciculata, synonym Licania fasciculata, is a species of plant in the family Chrysobalanaceae. It is endemic to Panama.

Moquilea fasciculata grows to a height of 12 m, with leaves between 9 cm and 13.5 cm long and flowers 6–7 mm in length, with densely clustered inflorescences.

It was first described in 1978 as Licania fasciculata by the botanist Ghillean Prance.
