= Moquilea salicifolia =

Conservation status
- Endangered (IUCN 3.1)

Scientific classification
- Kingdom: Plantae
- Clade: Embryophytes
- Clade: Tracheophytes
- Clade: Angiosperms
- Clade: Eudicots
- Clade: Rosids
- Order: Malpighiales
- Family: Chrysobalanaceae
- Genus: Moquilea
- Species: M. salicifolia

Binomial name
- Moquilea salicifolia (Cuatrec.) Sothers & Prance

Synonyms
- Licania salicifolia Cuatrec.

Species of flowering plant

Moquilea salicifolia, synonym Licania salicifolia, is a species of plant in the family Chrysobalanaceae. It is endemic to Colombia.
