= Moquilea vasquezii =

Conservation status
- Vulnerable (IUCN 2.3)

Scientific classification
- Kingdom: Plantae
- Clade: Embryophytes
- Clade: Tracheophytes
- Clade: Angiosperms
- Clade: Eudicots
- Clade: Rosids
- Order: Malpighiales
- Family: Chrysobalanaceae
- Genus: Moquilea
- Species: M. vasquezii

Binomial name
- Moquilea vasquezii (Prance) Sothers & Prance

Synonyms
- Licania vasquezii Prance

Species of plant

Moquilea vasquezii, synonym Licania vasquezii, is a species of plant in the family Chrysobalanaceae. It is endemic to Peru.
