= Moquilea megalophylla =

Conservation status
- Vulnerable (IUCN 3.1)

Scientific classification
- Kingdom: Plantae
- Clade: Embryophytes
- Clade: Tracheophytes
- Clade: Angiosperms
- Clade: Eudicots
- Clade: Rosids
- Order: Malpighiales
- Family: Chrysobalanaceae
- Genus: Moquilea
- Species: M. megalophylla

Binomial name
- Moquilea megalophylla (Prance) Sothers & Prance

Synonyms
- Licania megalophylla Prance

Species of flowering plant

Moquilea megalophylla, synonym Licania megalophylla, is a species of plant in the family Chrysobalanaceae. It is endemic to Ecuador. Its natural habitat is subtropical or tropical moist montane forests.
