= Moquilea hedbergii =

Conservation status
- Critically Endangered (IUCN 3.1)

Scientific classification
- Kingdom: Plantae
- Clade: Embryophytes
- Clade: Tracheophytes
- Clade: Angiosperms
- Clade: Eudicots
- Clade: Rosids
- Order: Malpighiales
- Family: Chrysobalanaceae
- Genus: Moquilea
- Species: M. hedbergii

Binomial name
- Moquilea hedbergii (Prance) Sothers & Prance

Synonyms
- Licania hedbergii Prance

Species of flowering plant

Moquilea hedbergii, synonym Licania hedbergii, is a species of plant in the family Chrysobalanaceae. It is a tree endemic to Ecuador. Its natural habitat is subtropical or tropical moist montane forests.

This tree was found in 1990 by Walter Palacios near the road to Nueva Loja, also known as Lago Agrio. It may also be present in the Cayambe Coca Ecological Reserve and Sumaco Napo-Galeras National Park. It is primarily threatened by deforestation.

The species was first described as Licania hedbergii by Ghillean Prance in 1993. In 2016 Prance and Sothers placed the species in genus Moquilea as M. hedbergii.
