= Sonza =

Sonza is a surname. Notable people with the surname include:

- Demetro Sonza (1934–2024), former Ilo Ilo vice governor
- Jay Sonza (born 1955), Filipino newscaster and talk show host
- Luísa Sonza (born 1998), Brazilian singer-songwriter

== Other uses ==
- Licania platypus, a tree native to Central America with the common name sonza
