= Pranceacanthus =

Scientific classification
- Kingdom: Plantae
- Clade: Tracheophytes
- Clade: Angiosperms
- Clade: Eudicots
- Clade: Asterids
- Order: Lamiales
- Family: Acanthaceae
- Genus: Pranceacanthus; Wassh. (1984)
- Species: P. coccineus

Binomial name
- Pranceacanthus coccineus Wassh. (1984)

Species of plants

Pranceacanthus is a monotypic genus of flowering plants belonging to the family Acanthaceae. It only contains one known species, Pranceacanthus coccineus Wassh.

It is native to Bolivia and (northern and west central) Brazil.

The genus name of Pranceacanthus is in honour of Ghillean Prance (b. 1937), a prominent British botanist and ecologist who has published extensively on the taxonomy of families such as Chrysobalanaceae and Lecythidaceae. The Latin specific epithet of coccineus means scarlet and is derived from coccum.. Both the genus and the species were first described and published in Brittonia Vol.36 on page 1 in 1984.
