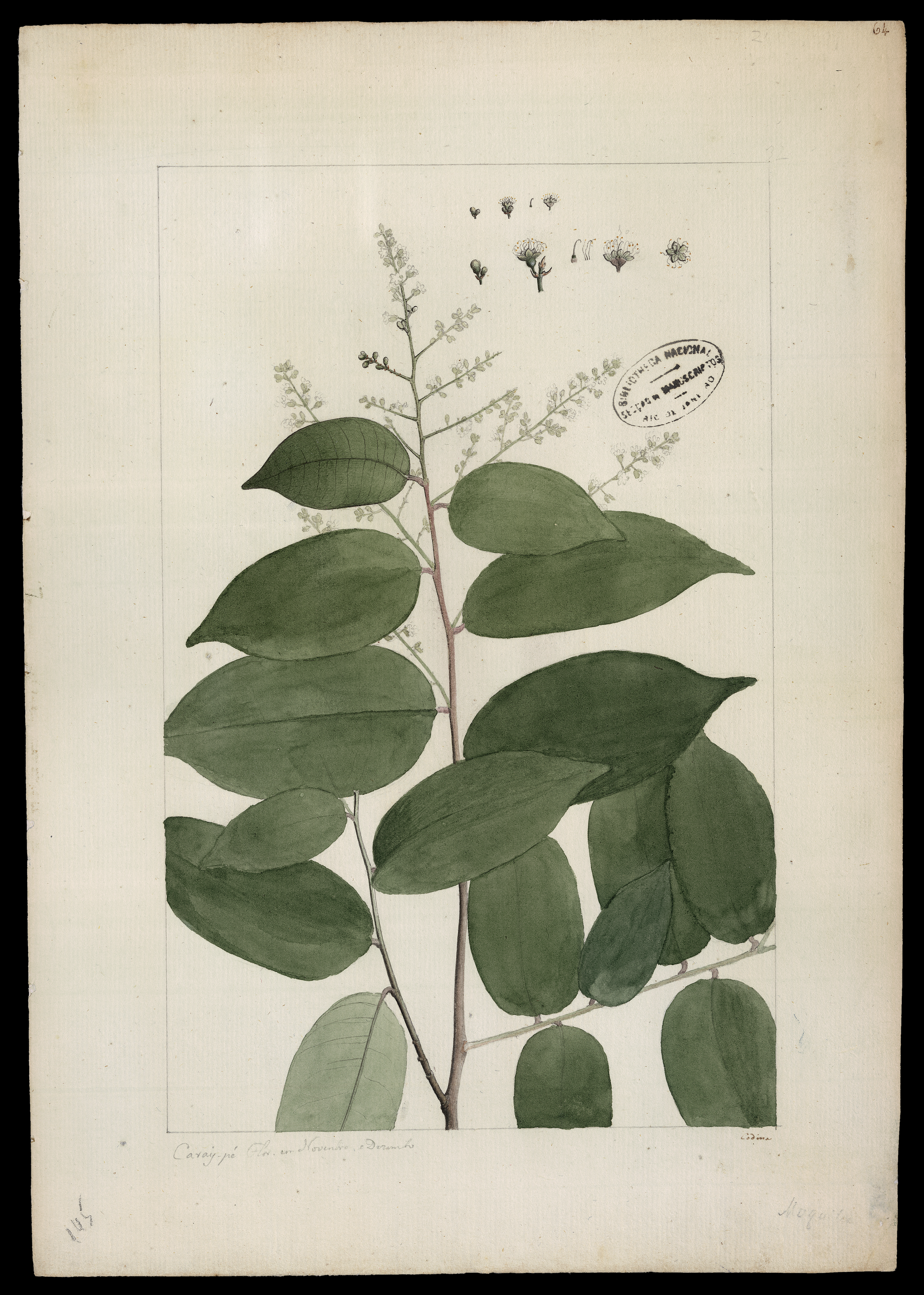
- Moquilea sp.

Scientific classification
- Kingdom: Plantae
- Clade: Tracheophytes
- Clade: Angiosperms
- Clade: Eudicots
- Clade: Rosids
- Order: Malpighiales
- Family: Chrysobalanaceae
- Genus: Moquilea; Aubl.

= Moquilea =

Genus of plants

Moquilea is a genus of flowering plants belonging to the family Chrysobalanaceae.

Its native range is Mexico to Tropical America.

Species:

- Moquilea angustata (Prance) Sothers & Prance
- Moquilea anneae (Prance) Sothers & Prance
- Moquilea araneosa (Taub.) Sothers & Prance
- Moquilea belloi (Prance) Sothers & Prance
- Moquilea boliviensis (Prance) Sothers & Prance
- Moquilea brittoniana (Fritsch) Sothers & Prance
- Moquilea cabrerae (Prance) Sothers & Prance
- Moquilea cariae (Cardozo) Sothers & Prance
- Moquilea cecidiophora (Prance) Sothers & Prance
- Moquilea celiae (Prance) Sothers & Prance
- Moquilea chiriquiensis (Prance) Sothers & Prance
- Moquilea chocoensis (Cuatrec.) Sothers & Prance
- Moquilea corniculata (Prance) Sothers & Prance
- Moquilea dodsonii (Prance) Sothers & Prance
- Moquilea durifolia (Cuatrec.) Sothers & Prance
- Moquilea egleri (Prance) Sothers & Prance
- Moquilea espinae (Prance) Sothers & Prance
- Moquilea fasciculata (Prance) Sothers & Prance
- Moquilea filomenoi (Prance) Sothers & Prance
- Moquilea fritschii (Prance) Sothers & Prance
- Moquilea gentryi (Prance) Sothers & Prance
- Moquilea gonzalezii (Miranda) Sothers & Prance
- Moquilea grandibracteata (Prance) Sothers & Prance
- Moquilea guatemalensis (Lundell) Sothers & Prance
- Moquilea guianensis Aubl.
- Moquilea hedbergii (Prance) Sothers & Prance
- Moquilea imbaimadaiensis (Prance) Sothers & Prance
- Moquilea jaramilloi (Prance) Sothers & Prance
- Moquilea kallunkiae (Prance) Sothers & Prance
- Moquilea klugii (Prance) Sothers & Prance
- Moquilea leucosepala (Griseb.) R.O.Williams
- Moquilea longicuspidata (Prance) Sothers & Prance
- Moquilea longipedicellata (Ducke) Sothers & Prance
- Moquilea longipetala (Prance) Sothers & Prance
- Moquilea magnifructa Sothers & Prance
- Moquilea maranhensis (Prance) Sothers & Prance
- Moquilea maritima (Prance) Sothers & Prance
- Moquilea megalophylla (Prance) Sothers & Prance
- Moquilea minutiflora Sagot
- Moquilea montana (Prance) Sothers & Prance
- Moquilea palcazuensis (Prance) Sothers & Prance
- Moquilea platypus Hemsl.
- Moquilea pyrifolia (Griseb.) R.O.Williams
- Moquilea salicifolia (Cuatrec.) Sothers & Prance
- Moquilea salzmannii Hook.f.
- Moquilea silvatica (Glaz. ex Prance) Sothers & Prance
- Moquilea subarachnophylla (Cuatrec.) Sothers & Prance
- Moquilea tachirensis (Prance) Sothers & Prance
- Moquilea tambopatensis (Prance) Sothers & Prance
- Moquilea tomentosa Benth.
- Moquilea unguiculata (Prance) Sothers & Prance
- Moquilea vasquezii (Prance) Sothers & Prance
- Moquilea velata (Cuatrec.) Sothers & Prance
- Moquilea veneralensis (Cuatrec.) Sothers & Prance
