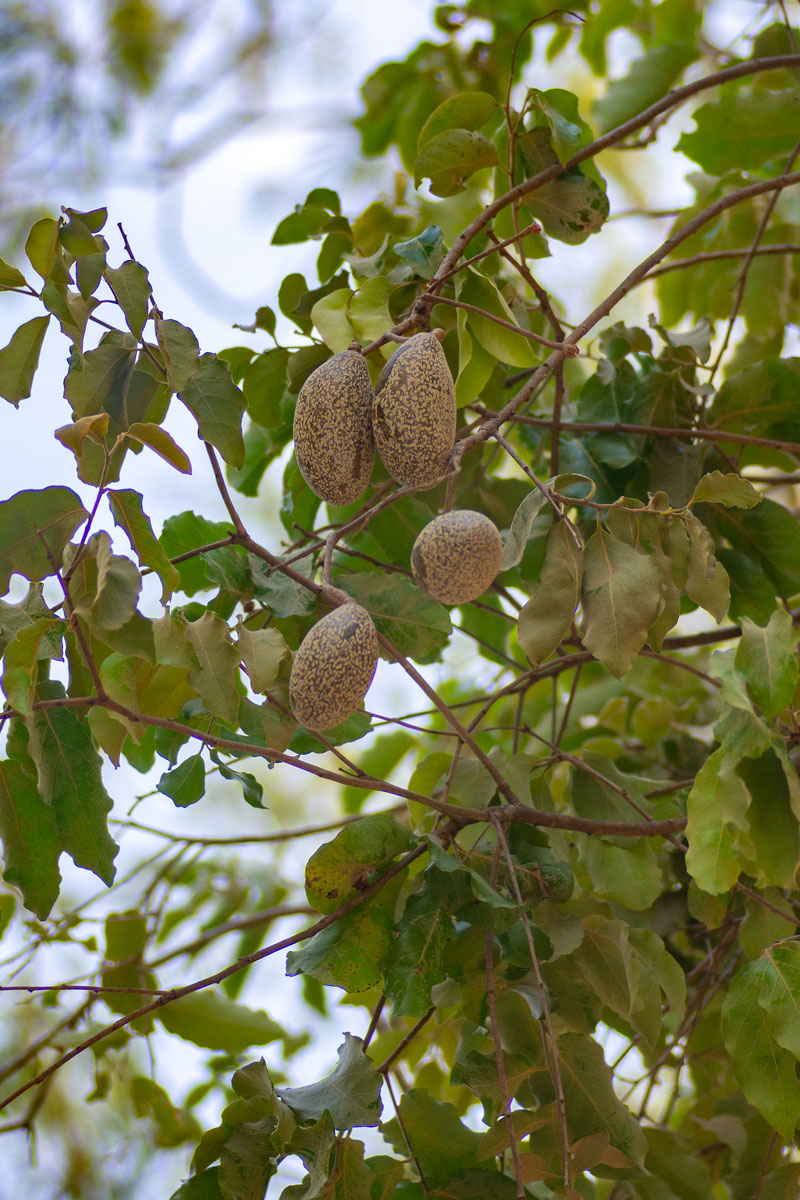
- Nearly ripe fruits of a tree in the central plaza of Puerto López, Meta, Colombia

Conservation status
- Least Concern (IUCN 3.1)

Scientific classification
- Kingdom: Plantae
- Clade: Embryophytes
- Clade: Tracheophytes
- Clade: Angiosperms
- Clade: Eudicots
- Clade: Rosids
- Order: Malpighiales
- Family: Chrysobalanaceae
- Genus: Moquilea
- Species: M. pyrifolia

Binomial name
- Moquilea pyrifolia (Griseb.) R.O.Williams

Synonyms
- Licania pyrifolia Griseb.; Moquilea macrocarpa Pittier

= Moquilea pyrifolia =

Species of tree

Moquilea pyrifolia, synonym Licania pyrifolia, commonly known as merecure, is a species of flowering tree in the family Chrysobalanaceae. It has large green fruits, similar in size to the avocado, greenish with whitish freckles. It is widespread in the Llanos or Great Plains of the Orinoco river. The fruit is edible and it used to be planted near the Fundos for shade because it is evergreen and because of its fruit. It contains compounds that can be used to control snails and other mollusks harmful to crops. Its Latin name alludes to its leaves being similar to those of the pear tree. It is the flagship tree of the state of Apure in Venezuela.
