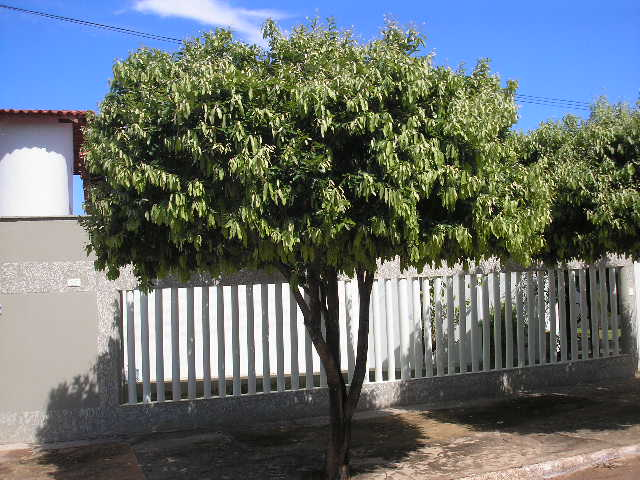
- In Minas Gerais
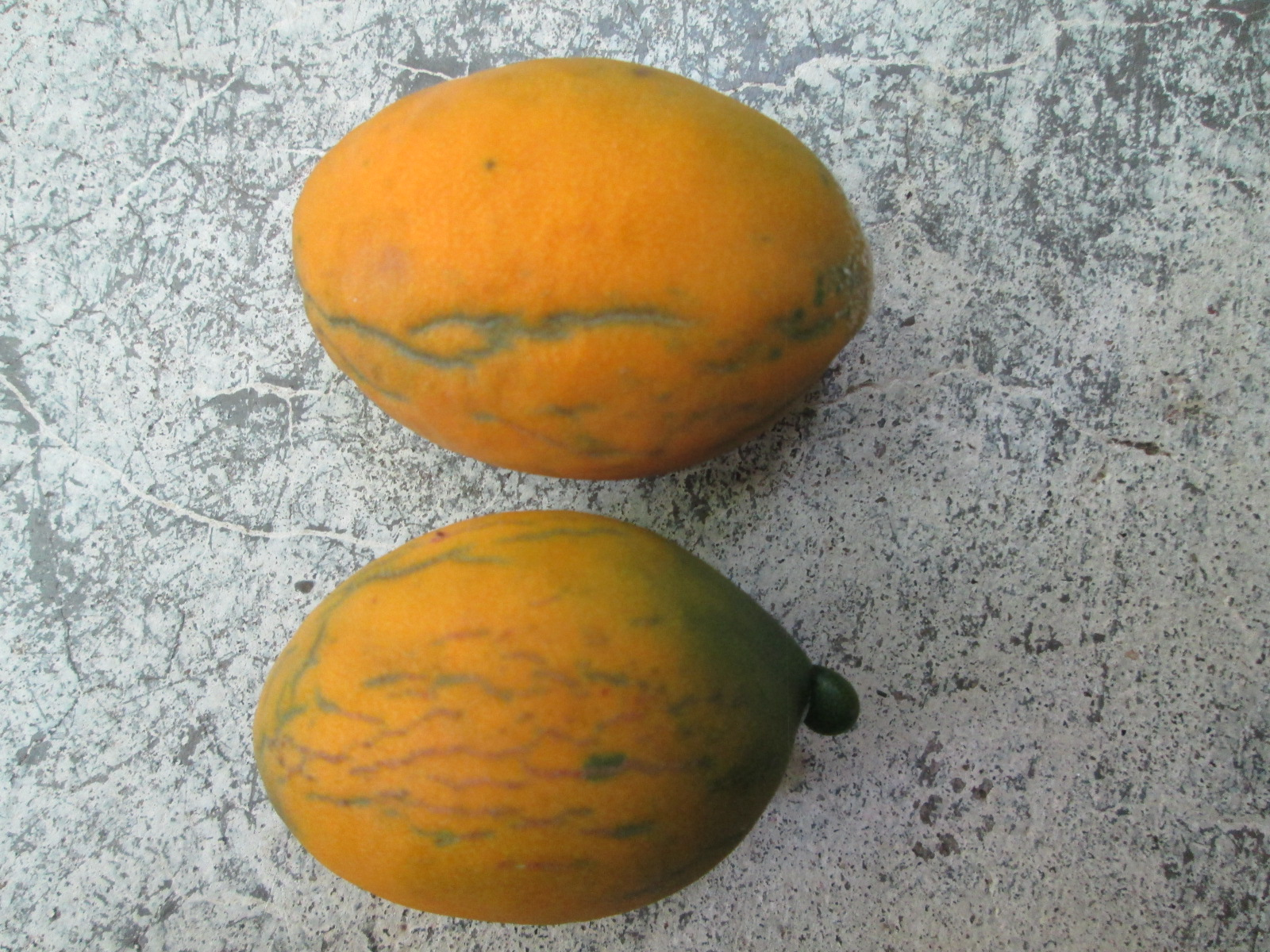
- Fruit

Conservation status
- Least Concern (IUCN 3.1)

Scientific classification
- Kingdom: Plantae
- Clade: Embryophytes
- Clade: Tracheophytes
- Clade: Spermatophytes
- Clade: Angiosperms
- Clade: Eudicots
- Clade: Rosids
- Order: Malpighiales
- Family: Chrysobalanaceae
- Genus: Moquilea
- Species: M. tomentosa

Binomial name
- Moquilea tomentosa Benth.

Synonyms
- Licania tomentosa (Benth.) Fritsch; Moquilea tomentosa var. angustifolia Hook.f.; Moquilea tomentosa var. latifolia Hook.f.; Pleragina odorata Arruda

= Moquilea tomentosa =

Species of flowering plant

Moquilea tomentosa (syn. Licania tomentosa) is a species of flowering plant in the family Chrysobalanaceae. It is a tree native to eastern and southern Brazil. It is widely cultivated for its abundant fruit in South America and South Africa, and it is used as a street tree in Brazil and Colombia.

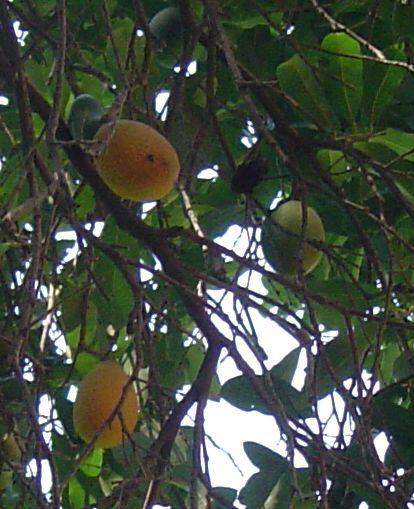
Ripe and unripe fruit

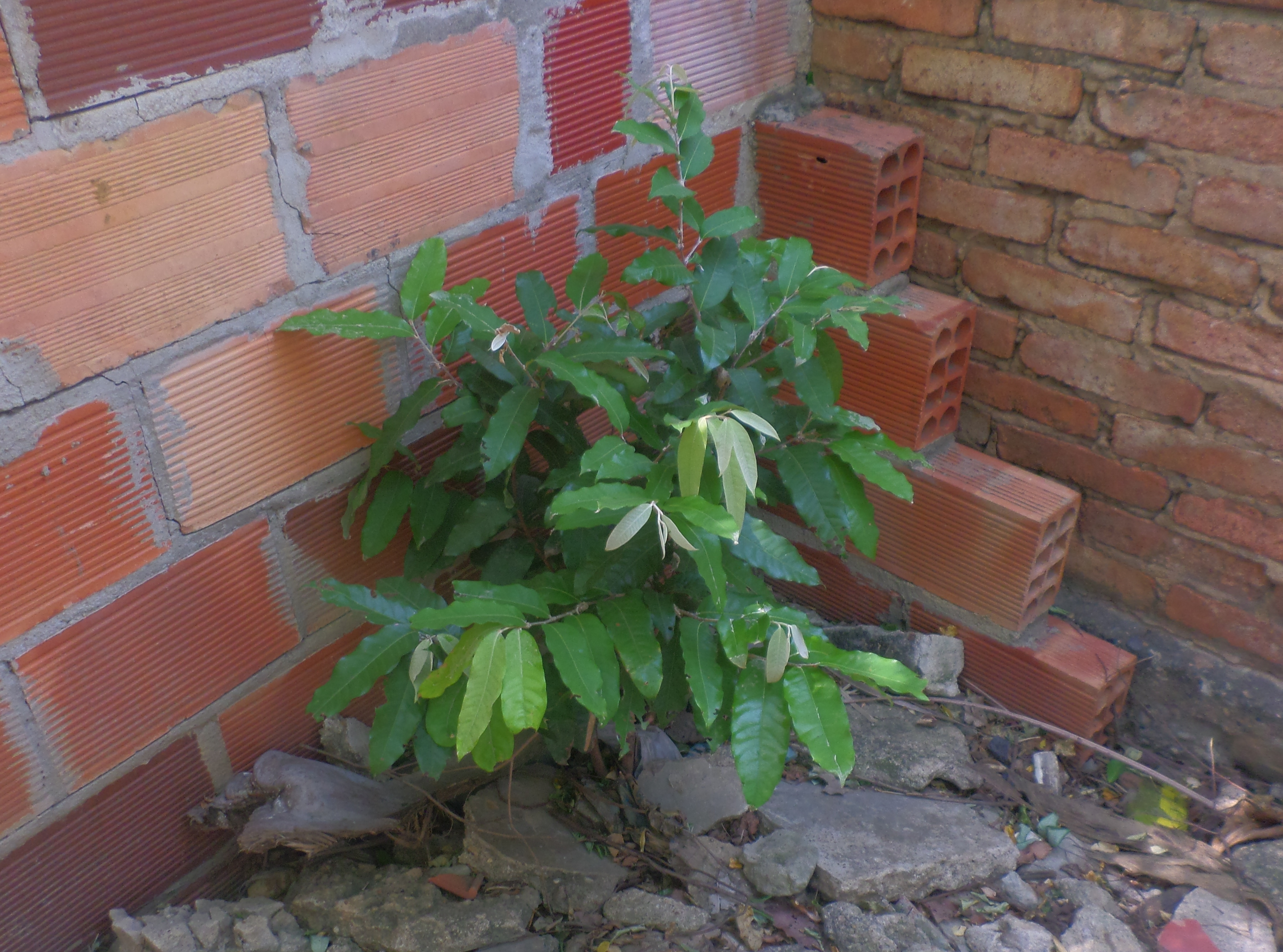
Growing wild in rubble

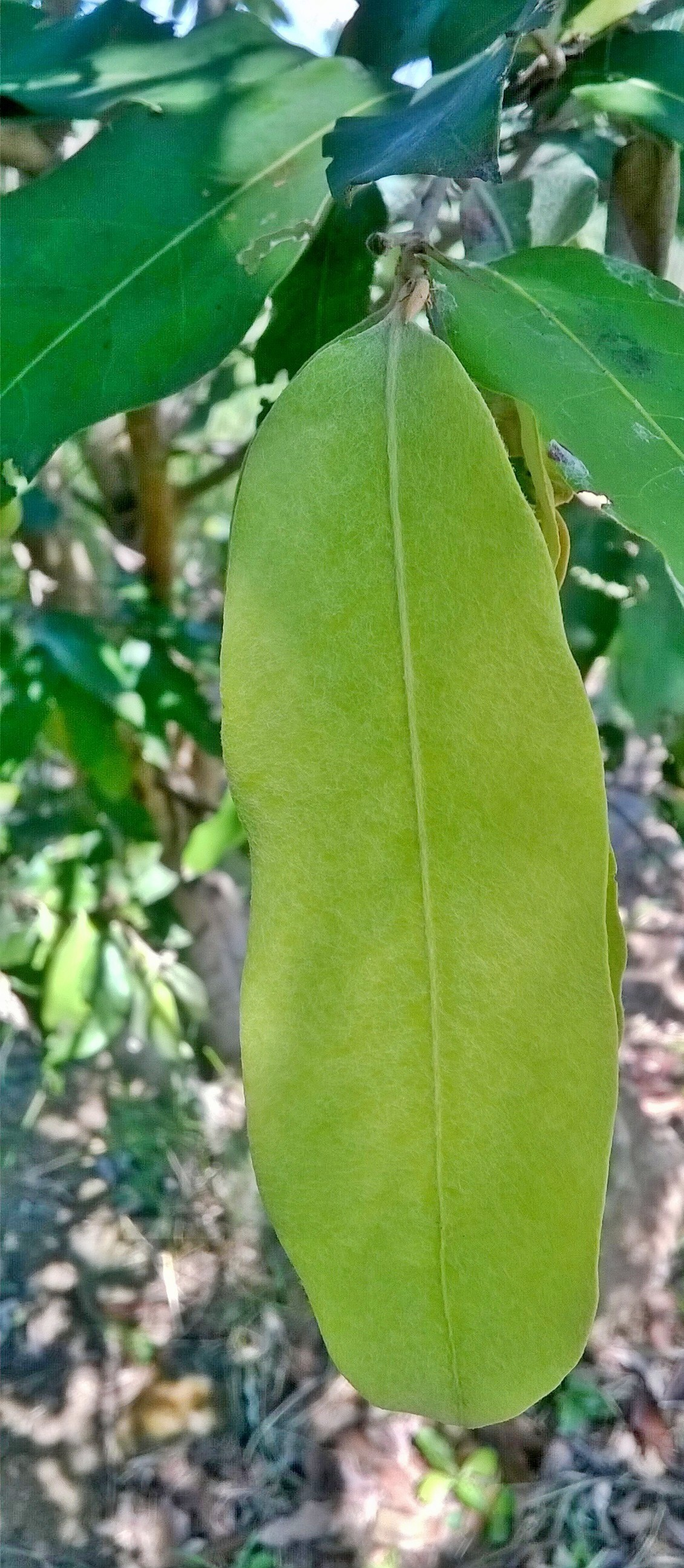
Close up of leaves

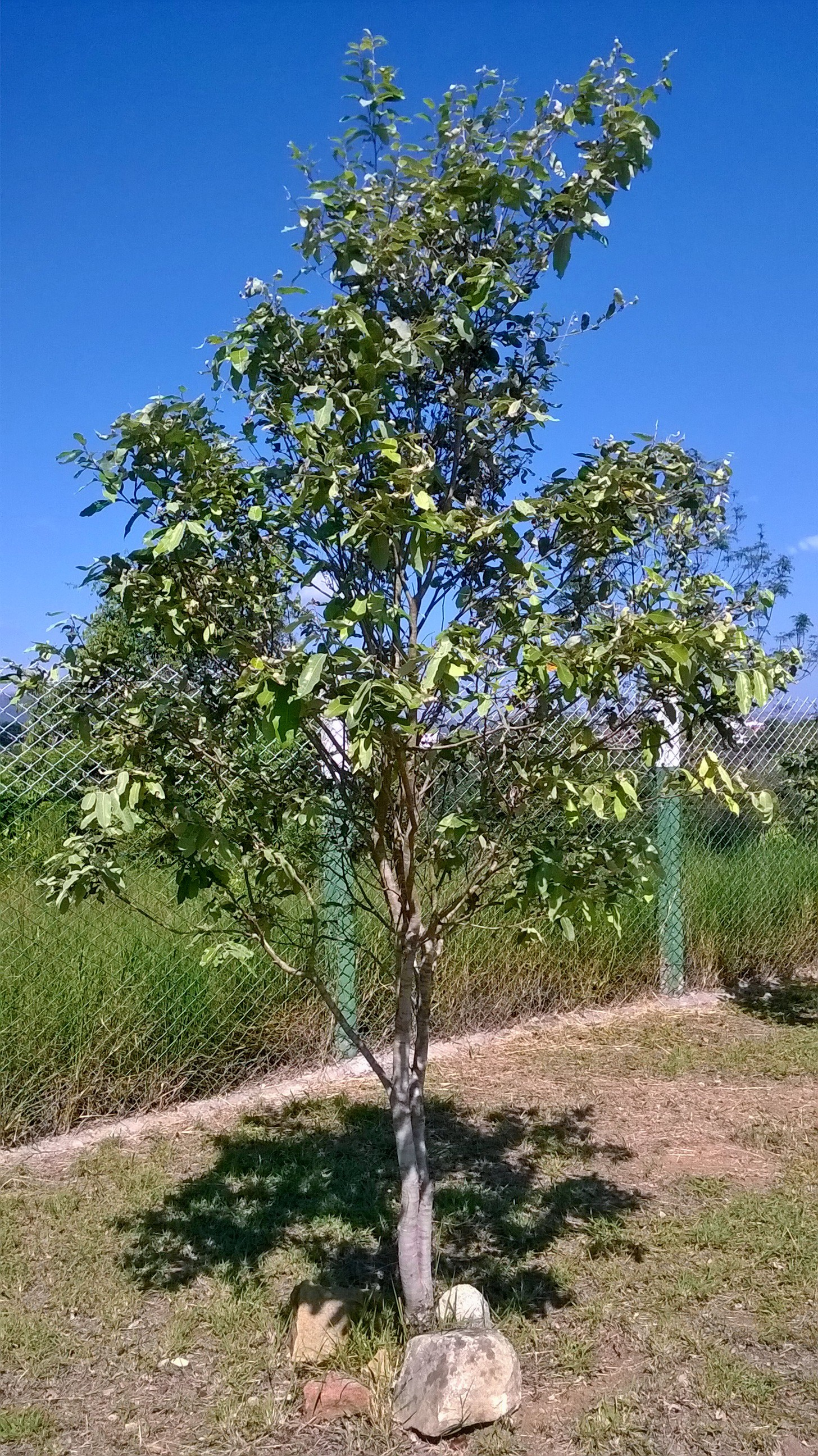
Young specimen
