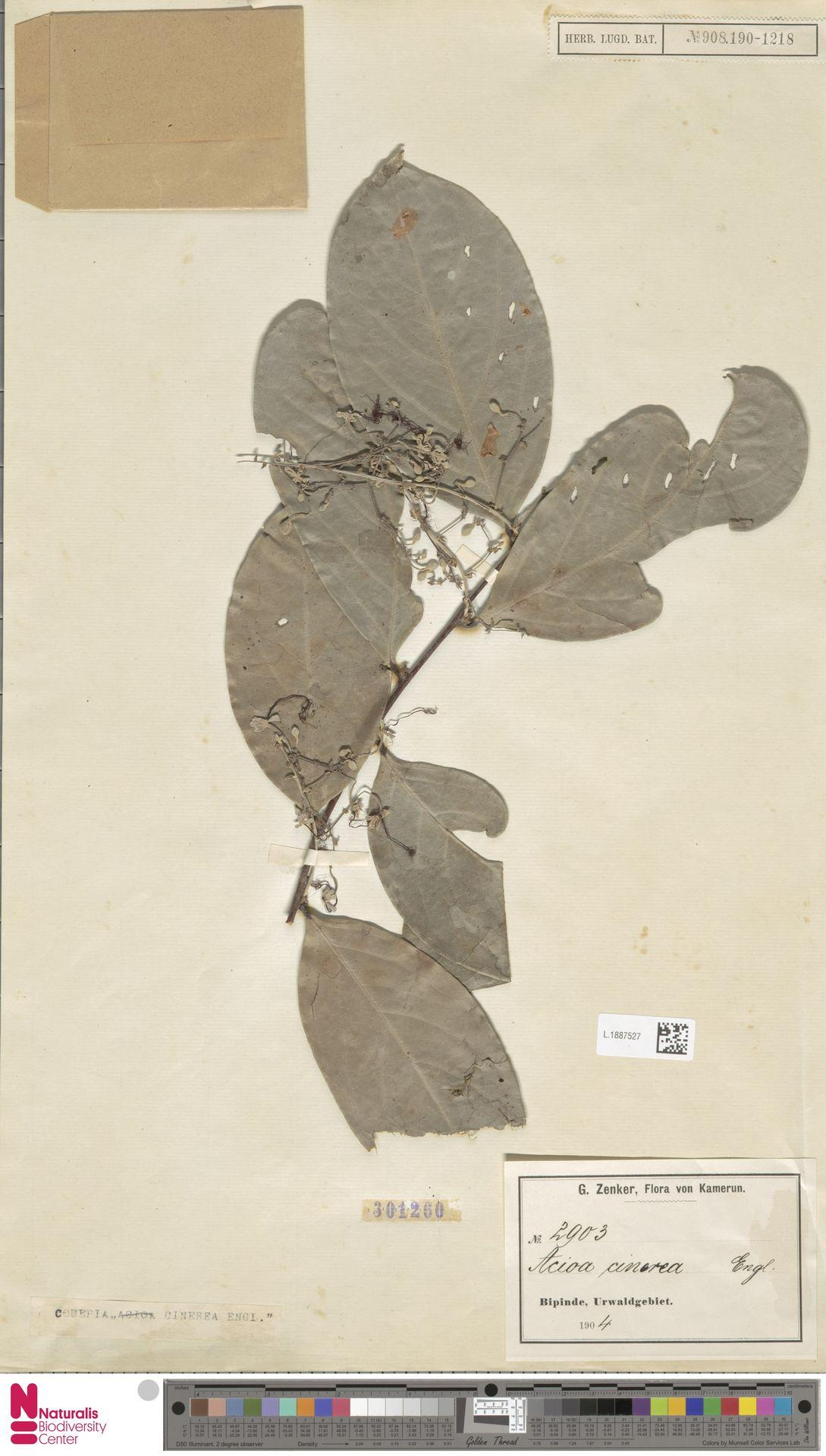
- Dactyladenia cinerea herbarium specimen

Scientific classification
- Kingdom: Plantae
- Clade: Tracheophytes
- Clade: Angiosperms
- Clade: Eudicots
- Clade: Rosids
- Order: Malpighiales
- Family: Chrysobalanaceae
- Genus: Dactyladenia; Welw.

Type species
- Dactyladenia floribunda Welw.

Synonyms
- Griffonia Hook.f. 1865, illegitimate homonym, not Baill. 1865 (Fabaceae)

= Dactyladenia =

Genus of plants

Dactyladenia is a genus of plants in the family Chrysobalanaceae. They are distributed in western and central Africa, from Liberia to Angola. There are about 31 species.

The genus was first described by Friedrich Welwitsch in his work Apontamentos Fito-geograficos sobre a Flora da Provincia de Angola na Africa Equinocial (1859).

Species

1. Dactyladenia barteri
2. Dactyladenia bellayana
3. Dactyladenia buchneri
4. Dactyladenia campestris
5. Dactyladenia chevalieri
6. Dactyladenia cinerea
7. Dactyladenia dewevrei
8. Dactyladenia dichotoma
9. Dactyladenia dinklagei
10. Dactyladenia eketensis
11. Dactyladenia floretii
12. Dactyladenia floribunda
13. Dactyladenia gilletii
14. Dactyladenia globosa
15. Dactyladenia hirsuta
16. Dactyladenia icondere
17. Dactyladenia johnstonei
18. Dactyladenia jongkindii
19. Dactyladenia laevis
20. Dactyladenia lehmbachii
21. Dactyladenia letestui
22. Dactyladenia librevillensis
23. Dactyladenia mannii
24. Dactyladenia ndjoleensis
25. Dactyladenia pallescens
26. Dactyladenia pierrei
27. Dactyladenia sapinii
28. Dactyladenia scabrifolia
29. Dactyladenia smeathmannii
30. Dactyladenia staudtii
31. Dactyladenia whytei
