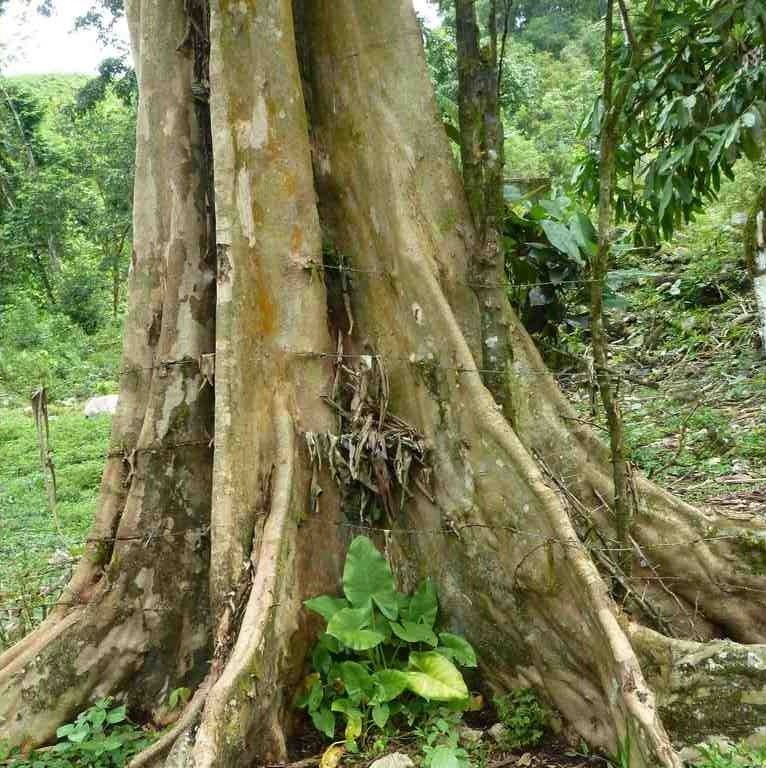
- Trunk of a large Moquilea platypus tree

Conservation status
- Least Concern (IUCN 3.1)

Scientific classification
- Kingdom: Plantae
- Clade: Tracheophytes
- Clade: Angiosperms
- Clade: Eudicots
- Clade: Rosids
- Order: Malpighiales
- Family: Chrysobalanaceae
- Genus: Moquilea
- Species: M. platypus

Binomial name
- Moquilea platypus Hemsl. (1879)

Synonyms
- Licania platypus (Hemsl.) Fritsch; Licania platypus (Hemsl.) Pittier

= Moquilea platypus =

Species of plant

Moquilea platypus, also known as sun sapote, sansapote, and monkey apple, is a flowering tree in the family Chrysobalanaceae. The specific epithet (platypus) is Neo-Latin for "flat-footed".

Licania platypus fruit, raw
Nutritional value per 100 g (3.5 oz)
- Carbohydrates
- Dietary fiber: 0.9-2.5 g
- Fat: 0.26-0.49 g
- Protein: 0.230-0.291 g
Vitamins and minerals
Vitamins	Quantity %DV^{†}
Vitamin A equiv. beta-Carotene	154% 157-273 μg
Thiamine (B1)	-13% 0.005-0.16 mg
Riboflavin (B2)	-2% 0.013-0.027 mg
Niacin (B3)	-8% 1.466-1.530 mg
Vitamin C	-29% 11.0-35.6 mg
Minerals	Quantity %DV^{†}
Calcium	8% 10.5-33.2 mg
Iron	-9% 0.52-1.70 mg
Phosphorus	22% 24.5-29.1 mg
- Other constituents: Quantity
- Water: 64.6-67.4 g
- ^{†}Percentages estimated using US recommendations for adults.

== Other names ==
Moquilea platypus has many common names across its native range, including sonzapote, sunzapote, sungano, zapote cabelludo, sapote, sangre, zapote amarillo, zapote borracho, zapote cabello, zapote de mico, zapote de mono, mesonsapote, mezonzapote, cabeza de mico, caca de nino, sonza, sunza, zunza, chaute jolobob, urraco, and chupa.

== Distribution ==
Moquilea platypus is native to southern Mexico south to northern Colombia and grows wild in dense forests up to 2,000 feet (610 meters) in elevation. It has been introduced to India, the Philippines, Trinidad and Tobago, Florida, and Hawaii.

== Description ==
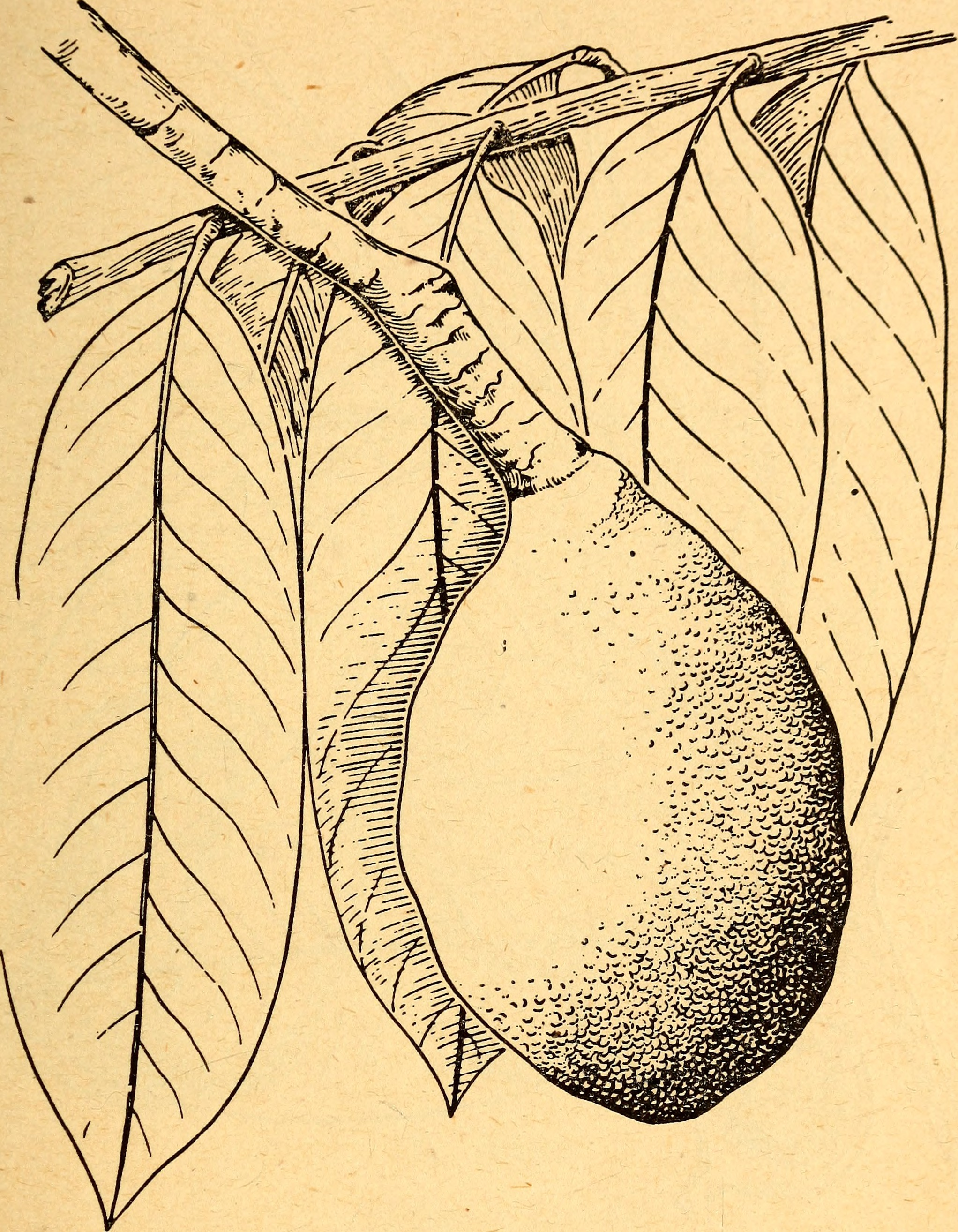
Illustration of a fruiting branch of Moquilea platypus

The tree grows erect, sometimes reaching 100–160 feet (30–49 meters) in height. It has a thick, rounded crown and is heavily foliaged. The bark is dark purplish to brown in color and is dotted with small white to reddish-white lenticels. The trunk is sometimes buttressed. The leaves are deciduous and alternate, sometimes spiraled, and elliptic to lanceolate in shape. They are pointed at both ends and measure 4–12 inches (10–30 centimeters) in length and 1.25–3.5 inches (3.2–8.9 centimeters) in width, and have thick midribs. New foliage is bronze or reddish-purple in color and is very showy. The flowers, which are abundant and fragrant and are in broad terminal and branched panicles which measure 4–14 inches (10–36 centimeters) in length, are small and hairy and have recurved petals with numerous protruding stamens. Only 1–3 fruits form from each particle. The fruit is edible and is obovoid to pyriform in shape and measures 5–8 inches (13–20 centimeters) in length and 4–5.5 inches (10–14 centimeters) in width. It has a rather thin, sometimes warty rind which is dark brown to reddish in color and dotted with white lenticels. The flesh is orange-yellow to yellow in color, somewhat pumpkin-scented, soft, fibrous, and dry or juicy, and is said to have a mildly sweet flavor somewhat similar to sapodilla. It normally contains 1 seed which is ovate to oblong and flattened in shape and measures 2.375–4 inches (6.03–10.16 centimeters) in length. It blooms from July to September and fruits from August to December the following year. Fruiting begins when the tree is about 10 years of age. It is hardy to USDA zone 11 and does not tolerate frost or temperatures below 4.5 °C (40.1 °F).

== Drought tolerance ==
Moquilea platypus is surprisingly drought tolerant compared to that of many other species native to central Panama. Experiments with 15-month-old seedlings showed slight wilting corresponding to leaf water potentials and relative water contents of −2.7 MPa and 0.85, and plants did not die until these values fell to −7.5 MPa and 0.14.

== Uses ==
The tree is planted as an ornamental and shade tree throughout Central America. The fruits, although held in low esteem, are eaten when no better fruits are available and are sometimes sold in local markets. They are eaten by tapirs and peccaries when fallen on the ground. The wood of the tree is fine-grained, heavy, and strong, although not durable in contact with the ground. It is sometimes used in furniture making and cabinetwork, although not often as the tree is seldom felled.

== See also ==
- List of culinary fruits
