= Frank White (botanist) =

English botanist (1927–1994)

Frank White (5 March 1927 – 12 September 1994) was a botanist who was an expert on African flora and curator of the herbarium at the University of Oxford.

== See also ==
Category:Taxa named by Frank White (botanist)
