= Ghillean Prance =

British botanist and ecologist

Sir Ghillean Prance
- Born: Ghillean Tolmie Prance; 13 July 1937 (age 89); Brandeston, Suffolk, England
- Education: Keble College, University of Oxford
- Known for: Director of the Royal Botanic Gardens, Kew (1988–1999)
- Awards: Linnean Medal (1990); International Cosmos Prize (1993); Fellow of the Royal Society (1993); Knight Bachelor
- Scientific career
- Fields: Botany
- Workplaces: New York Botanical Garden (1963–1988)
- Thesis: A taxonomic study of the Chrysobalanaceae (1963)
- Author abbrev. (botany): Prance
- Website: edenproject.com/eden-story/about-us/sir-ghillean-prance-frs-vmh

Sir Ghillean Tolmie Prance FRS FLS FRSB (born 13 July 1937) is a prominent British botanist and ecologist who has published extensively on the taxonomy of families such as Chrysobalanaceae and Lecythidaceae, but drew particular attention in documenting the pollination ecology of Victoria amazonica. Prance is a former director of the Royal Botanic Gardens, Kew.

== Early life ==
Prance was born on 13 July 1937 in Brandeston, Suffolk, England. He was educated at Malvern College and Keble College, Oxford. In 1957, he achieved BSc Biology. In 1963 he received a D.Phil. in Forest Botany from the Commonwealth Forestry Institute, Oxford.

== Career ==
Prance worked from 1963 at The New York Botanical Garden, initially as a research assistant and, on his departure in 1988, as Director of the Institute of Economic Botany and Senior Vice-president for Science. Much of his career at the New York Botanical Garden was spent conducting extensive fieldwork in the Amazon region of Brazil. In 1973 he coordinated the first Botany Postgraduate Degree held in the Amazon, at National Institute of Amazonian Research, in Manaus. He was Director of the Royal Botanic Gardens, Kew from 1988 to 1999.

== Later work ==
He has remained very active in his retirement, notably involving himself with the Eden Project. Prance, a devout Christian, was the chair of A Rocha and was president of Christians in Science 2002–08.

He is actively involved on environmental issues, a trustee of the Amazon Charitable Trust, and a vice-president of the Nature in Art Trust. He has been president of the UK Wild Flower Society for several years.

== Honours ==
Prance was knighted in 1995. He has been a Fellow of the Linnean Society since 1961, and served as its president in the years 1997–2000. He was made a Fellow of the Royal Society in 1993, and was awarded the Victoria Medal of Honour in 1999. He was awarded the Patron's Medal of the Royal Geographical Society in 1994.

In 2000 he was made a Commander of the Order of the Southern Cross by the President of Brazil. In 2012 he was awarded the Order of the Rising Sun, Gold Rays and Neck Ribbon by the Government of Japan.

== Legacy ==
Two photographic portraits of Prance are held at the National Portrait Gallery, London.

In 1984, botanist Dieter Carl Wasshausen published Pranceacanthus, a genus of flowering plants from Brazil and Bolivia belonging to the family Acanthaceae and named after Prance.

A biography of Prance was written by Clive Langmead in 2001.

== Works ==
- Bebber, D. P.; Carine, M. A.; Wood, J. R. I.; Wortley, A. H.; Harris, D. J.; Prance, G. T.; Davidse, G.; Paige, J.; Pennington, T. D.; Robson, N. K. B.; Scotland, R. W. (2010). "Herbaria are a major frontier for species discovery". Proceedings of the National Academy of Sciences. 107 (51): 22169–22171. Bibcode:2010PNAS..10722169B. doi:10.1073/pnas.1011841108. PMC 3009773. PMID 21135225.
- Prance, G. T.; Nesbitt, Mark. (eds) The Cultural History of Plants. Routledge.
- Prance, G. T. (2002). "Species survival and carbon retention in commercially exploited tropical rainforest". Philosophical Transactions of the Royal Society A: Mathematical, Physical and Engineering Sciences. 360 (1797): 1777–1785. Bibcode:2002RSPTA.360.1777P. doi:10.1098/rsta.2002.1041. PMID 12460497. S2CID 23286528.
- Brown, S.; Swingland, I. R.; Hanbury-Tenison, R.; Prance, G. T.; Myers, N. (2002). "Changes in the use and management of forests for abating carbon emissions: Issues and challenges under the Kyoto Protocol". Philosophical Transactions of the Royal Society A: Mathematical, Physical and Engineering Sciences. 360 (1797): 1593–1605. Bibcode:2002RSPTA.360.1593B. doi:10.1098/rsta.2002.1021. PMID 12460486. S2CID 2549023.
- Prance, G. T. (2000). "Ethnobotany and the future of conservation". Biologist (London, England). 47 (2): 65–68. PMID 11190230.
- Prance, G. (1999). "The poisons and narcotics of the Amazonian Indians". Journal of the Royal College of Physicians of London. 33 (4): 368–376. doi:10.1016/S0035-8819(25)01696-4. PMC 9665745. PMID 10472027.
- Morton, C.; Mori, S.; Prance, G.; Karol, K.; Chase, M. (1997). "Phylogenetic relationships of Lecythidaceae: A cladistic analysis using rbcL sequence and morphological data". American Journal of Botany. 84 (4): 530–540. doi:10.2307/2446029. JSTOR 2446029. PMID 21708605.
- Dalton, H.; Goodwin, B.; Ho, M. W.; McGlade, J.; Prance, G.; Saunders, P.; Sherratt, D.; Smith, J. M.; Whittenbury, R. (1997). "Patent threat to research". Nature. 385 (6618): 672. Bibcode:1997Natur.385..672D. doi:10.1038/385672a0. PMID 9034179.
- Prance, G. T. (1991). "What is ethnobotany today?". Journal of Ethnopharmacology. 32 (1–3): 209–216. doi:10.1016/0378-8741(91)90120-3. PMID 1881159.
- Prance, G. T. (1982). "Threatened Plants". Science. 216 (4549): 977–978. Bibcode:1982Sci...216..977S. doi:10.1126/science.216.4549.977. PMID 17809062.
- Mori, S. A.; Orchard, J. E.; Prance, G. T. (1980). "Intrafloral Pollen Differentiation in the New World Lecythidaceae, Subfamily Lecythidoideae". Science. 209 (4454): 400–403. Bibcode:1980Sci...209..400M. doi:10.1126/science.209.4454.400. PMID 17747812. S2CID 20448653.
- Fidalgo, O.; Prance, G. T. (1976). "The ethnomycology of the Sanama Indians". Mycologia. 68 (1): 201–210. doi:10.2307/3758915. JSTOR 3758915. PMID 934181.
- Prance, G. T. (1973). "The mycological diet of the Yanomam Indians". Mycologia. 65 (1): 248–250. doi:10.2307/3757814. JSTOR 3757814. PMID 4734424.

== Video ==
- A Passion for Plants (DVD), Christian Television Association (of the UK)
