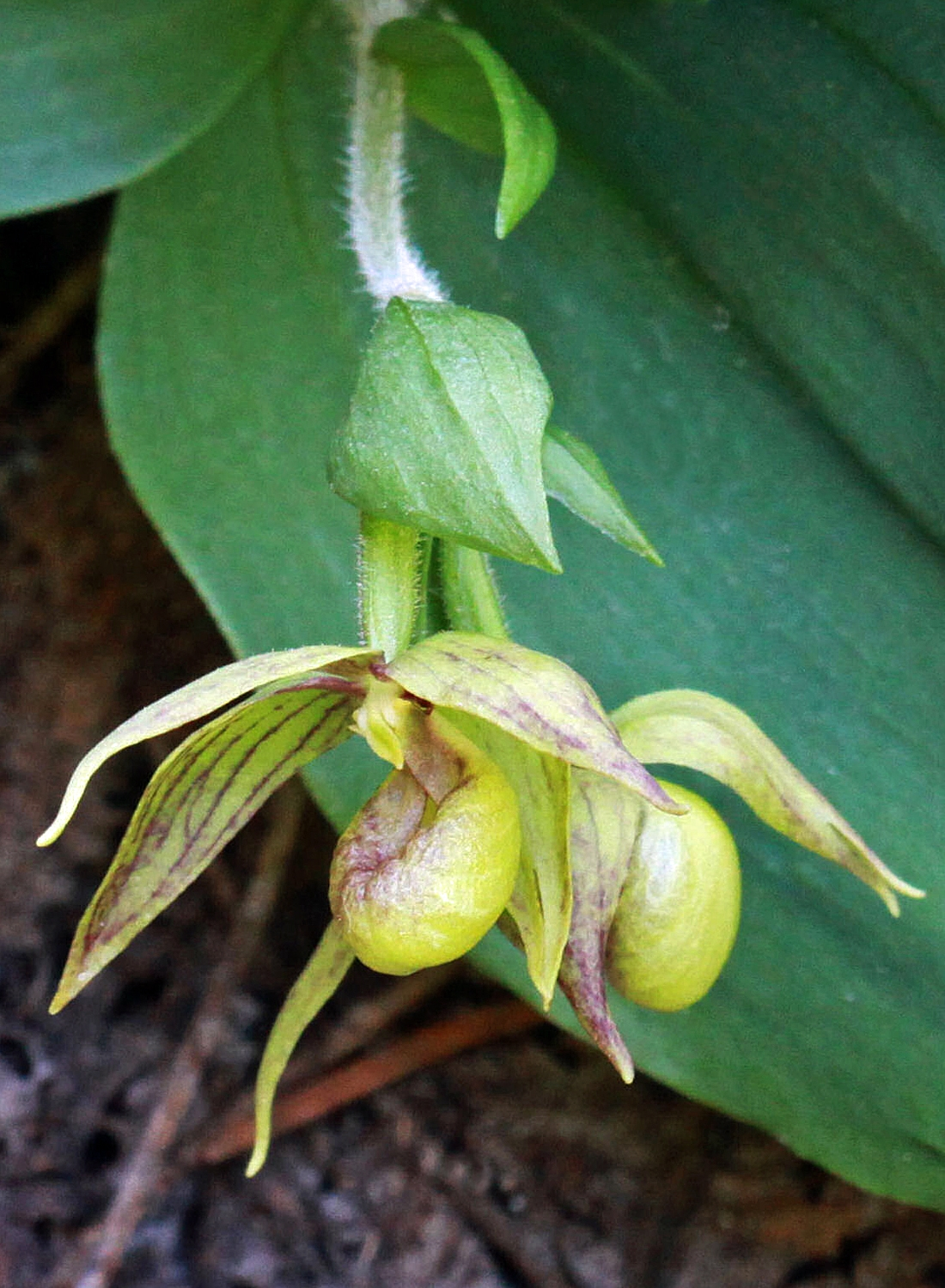
- At Lake Blanche, Big Cottonwood Canyon, Utah

Conservation status
- Vulnerable (IUCN 3.1)

- Apparently Secure (NatureServe)

Scientific classification
- Kingdom: Plantae
- Clade: Tracheophytes
- Clade: Angiosperms
- Clade: Monocots
- Order: Asparagales
- Family: Orchidaceae
- Subfamily: Cypripedioideae
- Genus: Cypripedium
- Species: C. fasciculatum

Binomial name
- Cypripedium fasciculatum Kellogg

Synonyms
- List: Cypripedium fasciculatum f. purpureum P.M.Br.; Cypripedium fasciculatum var. pusillum (Rolfe) Hook.f.; Cypripedium fasciculatum f. viride P.M.Br.; Cypripedium knightae A.Nelson; Cypripedium pusillum Rolfe

= Cypripedium fasciculatum =

Western US orchid species

Cypripedium fasciculatum, the clustered lady's slipper, is a member of the orchid genus Cypripedium. Members of this genus are commonly referred to as ladies' slippers. C. fasciculatum, along with C. montanum and C. californicum, are the only members of the genus Cypripedium that are endemic to western North America.

== Description ==
Cypripedium fasciculatum has two plicate leaves that are usually near the ground, but can be elevated up to 15 cm (5.9 in) in some individuals. Up to four flowers hang from a drooping stem, sometimes resting on the leaves or even on the ground. The petals and sepals are green to purplish-brown while the pouch is yellowish-green with purple streaking near the opening.

== Taxonomy ==
The botanist Albert Kellogg scientifically described and named Cypripedium fasciculatum in 1879. It is classified in the genus Cypripedium within the family Orchidaceae. It has no accepted varieties according to Plants of the World Online.

== Range ==
C. fasciculatum is found in the western United States in Washington, Oregon, California, Colorado, Montana, Idaho, Utah, and Wyoming. It is usually found in cool, open coniferous forests, mostly in the mountains.
