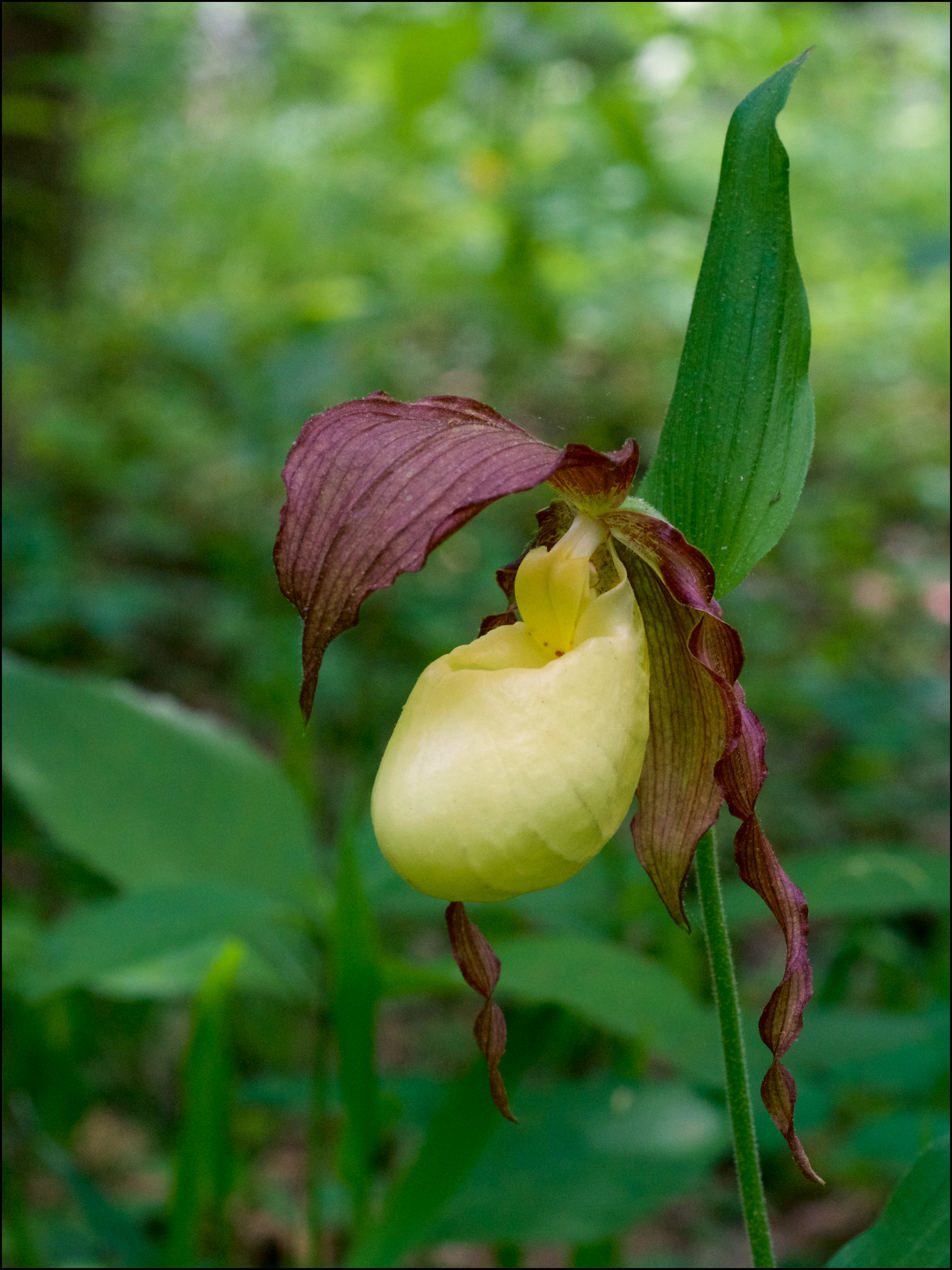

Conservation status
- Vulnerable (IUCN 3.1)

- Vulnerable (NatureServe)

Scientific classification
- Kingdom: Plantae
- Clade: Tracheophytes
- Clade: Angiosperms
- Clade: Monocots
- Order: Asparagales
- Family: Orchidaceae
- Subfamily: Cypripedioideae
- Genus: Cypripedium
- Species: C. kentuckiense

Binomial name
- Cypripedium kentuckiense C.F.Reed

= Cypripedium kentuckiense =

Species of orchid

Cypripedium kentuckiense, the Kentucky lady's slipper or southern lady's slipper, is a member of the orchid genus Cypripedium. Members of this genus are commonly referred to as lady's slipper orchids.

Originally thought to be an aberrant form of Cypripedium parviflorum var. pubescens, the morphology of C. kentuckiense suggests it is a species of its own. However, molecular evidence suggests that C. kentuckiense is more closely related to Cypripedium parviflorum var. parviflorum than it is to Cypripedium parviflorum var. pubescens.

== Description ==
C. kentuckiense has the largest flower of in the genus Cypripedium. The petals and sepals are greenish striped and mottled with purple while the very large lip, or pouch, is a creamy ivory or pale yellow. The plant can be up to 70 cm (28 in) tall and has bract leaf-like leaves that are up to 12 cm (4.7 in) long. Each plant is usually single-flowered.

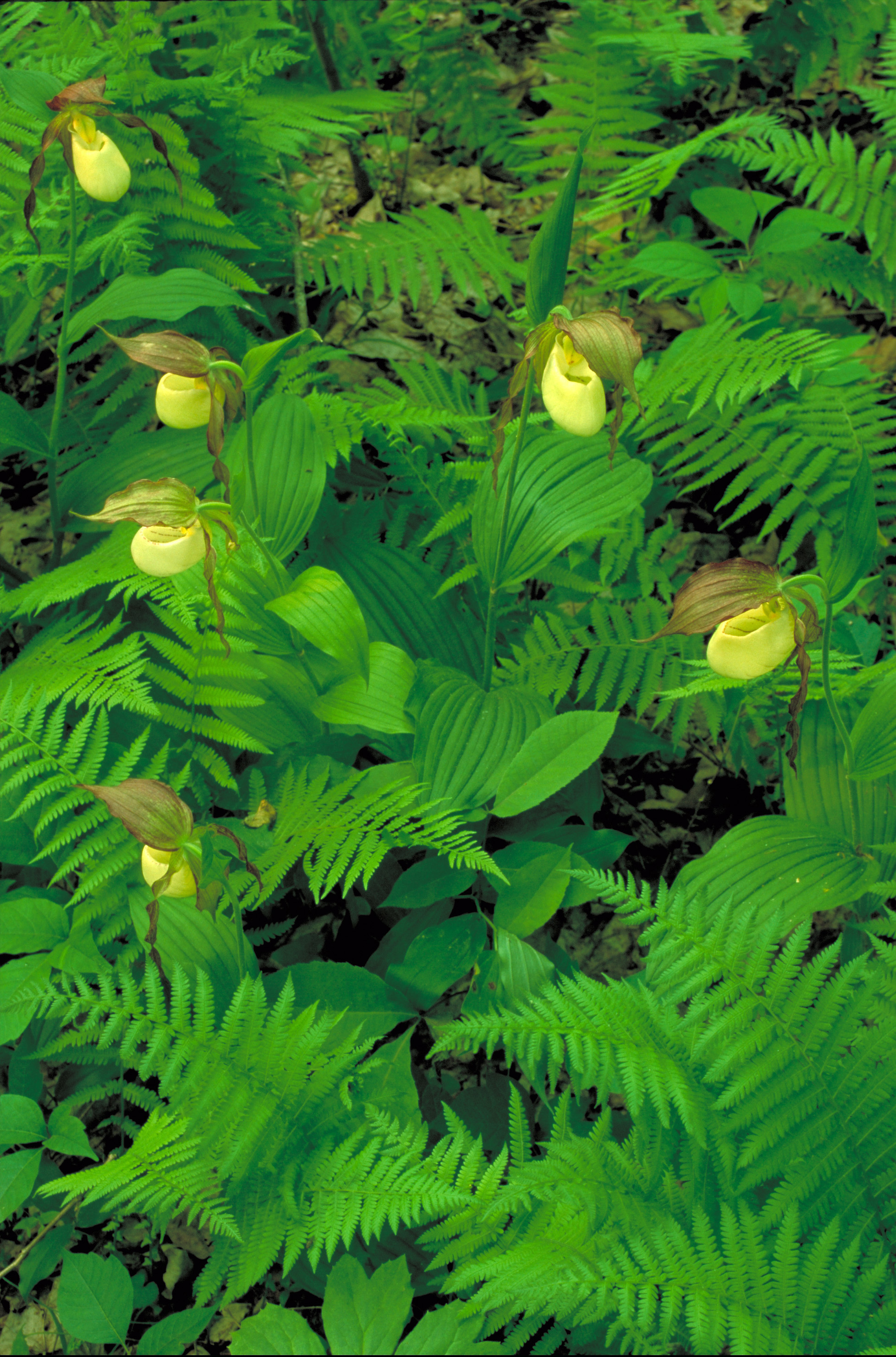
Cypripedium kentuckiense

== Distribution and habitat ==
Cypripedium kentuckiense is found in a large swathe through the Southern United States including Alabama, Arkansas, Georgia, Kentucky, Louisiana, Mississippi, Oklahoma, Tennessee, and Texas. Additionally, there is a small patch in Lancaster County, Virginia.

The range of this species is not continuous; it mostly consists of relatively isolated patches. It is found in a variety of habitats including floodplains, ravines, forests, and other areas on acidic or sandy soils.
