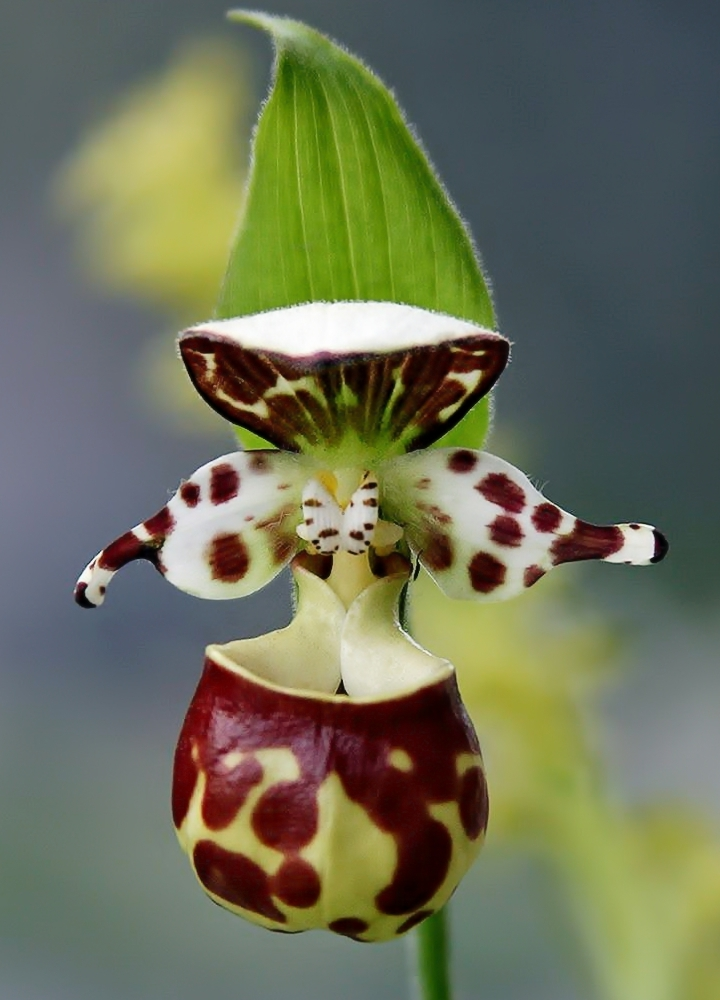

Conservation status
- Near Threatened (IUCN 3.1)

- Apparently Secure (NatureServe)

Scientific classification
- Kingdom: Plantae
- Clade: Tracheophytes
- Clade: Angiosperms
- Clade: Monocots
- Order: Asparagales
- Family: Orchidaceae
- Subfamily: Cypripedioideae
- Genus: Cypripedium
- Species: C. yatabeanum

Binomial name
- Cypripedium yatabeanum Makino

Synonyms
- Cypripedium guttatum var. yatabeanum (Makino) Pfitzer in H.G.A.Engler; Cypripedium guttatum subsp. yatabeanum (Makino) Hultén

= Cypripedium yatabeanum =

Spotted lady slipper

Species of orchid

Cypripedium yatabeanum, known as the spotted lady slipper or palomino lady's slipper, is a species of terrestrial orchid in the family Orchidaceae. It is native to Alaska (including the Aleutian Islands), to the Russian Far East (Kamchatka and the Kuril Islands), and northern Japan. It is distinguished from the closely related Cypripedium guttatum by its yellow-green flowers and narrower, longer lip. It is a perennial herb that grows up to 2 ft (0.61 m) tall. Its habitats include mesic tundra, marsh borders, and beach dune lag.
