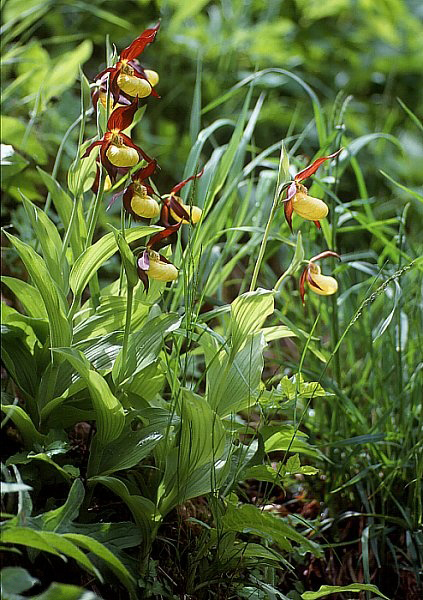

Conservation status
- Least Concern (IUCN 3.1)

Scientific classification
- Kingdom: Plantae
- Clade: Tracheophytes
- Clade: Angiosperms
- Clade: Monocots
- Order: Asparagales
- Family: Orchidaceae
- Subfamily: Cypripedioideae
- Genus: Cypripedium
- Species: C. calceolus

Binomial name
- Cypripedium calceolus L.

Synonyms
- Cypripedium boreale Salisb. (1796); Cypripedium ferrugineum Gray (1821); Cypripedium atsmori C. Morren (1851); Cypripedium cruciatum Dulac (1867); Cypripedium alternifolium St.-Lag. (1880); Cypripedium microsaccos Kraenzl. (1913); Calceolus marianus Crantz; Calceolus alternifolius St.-Lag.; Cypripedium guttatum subsp. microsaccos (Kraenzl.) Soó

= Cypripedium calceolus =

Species of orchid

Cypripedium calceolus is a lady's-slipper orchid, and the type species of the genus Cypripedium. It is native to Europe and Asia.

== Taxonomy ==
Cypripedium comes from the Greek Κύπρις πεδίον (Kypris pedion), meaning Aphrodite's foot (a reference to the goddess Aphrodite, equivalent to the Roman Venus). Calceolus is Latin for a small shoe.

Cypripedium calceolus does not occur in North America, though the closely related Cypripedium parviflorum and C. pubescens are often still referred to as subspecies or varieties of C. calceolus.

== Description ==
This is the largest-flowered orchid species in Europe, growing up to 60 cm (24 in) tall, with flowers as wide as 9 cm (3.5 in). Before it flowers, it can be distinguished from other orchids by the large size and width of its ovate leaves, which can be as large as 18 cm (7.1 in) long and 9 cm (3.5 in) wide, and like other orchids, it exhibits parallel venation. Each shoot has up to four leaves and a small number of flowers (typically one or two) with long, often twisted petals that vary in colour from red-brown to black (rarely green), and a yellow labellum shaped like a slipper with red dots visible inside. It is a long-lived perennial and spreads using horizontal stems (rhizomes).

Cypripedium calceolus can be confused, when not flowering, with Allium ursinum, Convallaria majalis or several species of Epipactis orchid. In the vegetative state in the field it is commonly confused with co-occurring Veratrum album, but C. calceolus has two rows of alternate leaves (it has distichous phyllotaxy) and fluted leaf bases surrounding the stem, whereas V. album has a spiral phyllotaxy with three rows of leaves along the stem, with the stem clearly visible between the leaves. It closely resembles other species of Cypripedium orchid native to the United States (see taxonomy).

Chromosome number has been given as 2n=20 but also 2n=22.

== Distribution and habitat ==
It has a widespread distribution from Europe east through Asia from Spain to the Pacific, including almost every country in Europe plus Russia (European Russia, Siberia, and the Russian Far East), northeastern China (Heilongjiang, Jilin, Liaoning, Nei Mongol), Mongolia, Korea and Rebun Island in Japan.

It is typically found in open woodlands on moist calcareous soils. In continental Europe, it also grows in decomposed humus in semi-shaded limestone woodlands. Its population has declined significantly across much of the Europe, and it is therefore legally protected in several countries. Its upper elevational limit is 2,100 metres (6,900 ft).

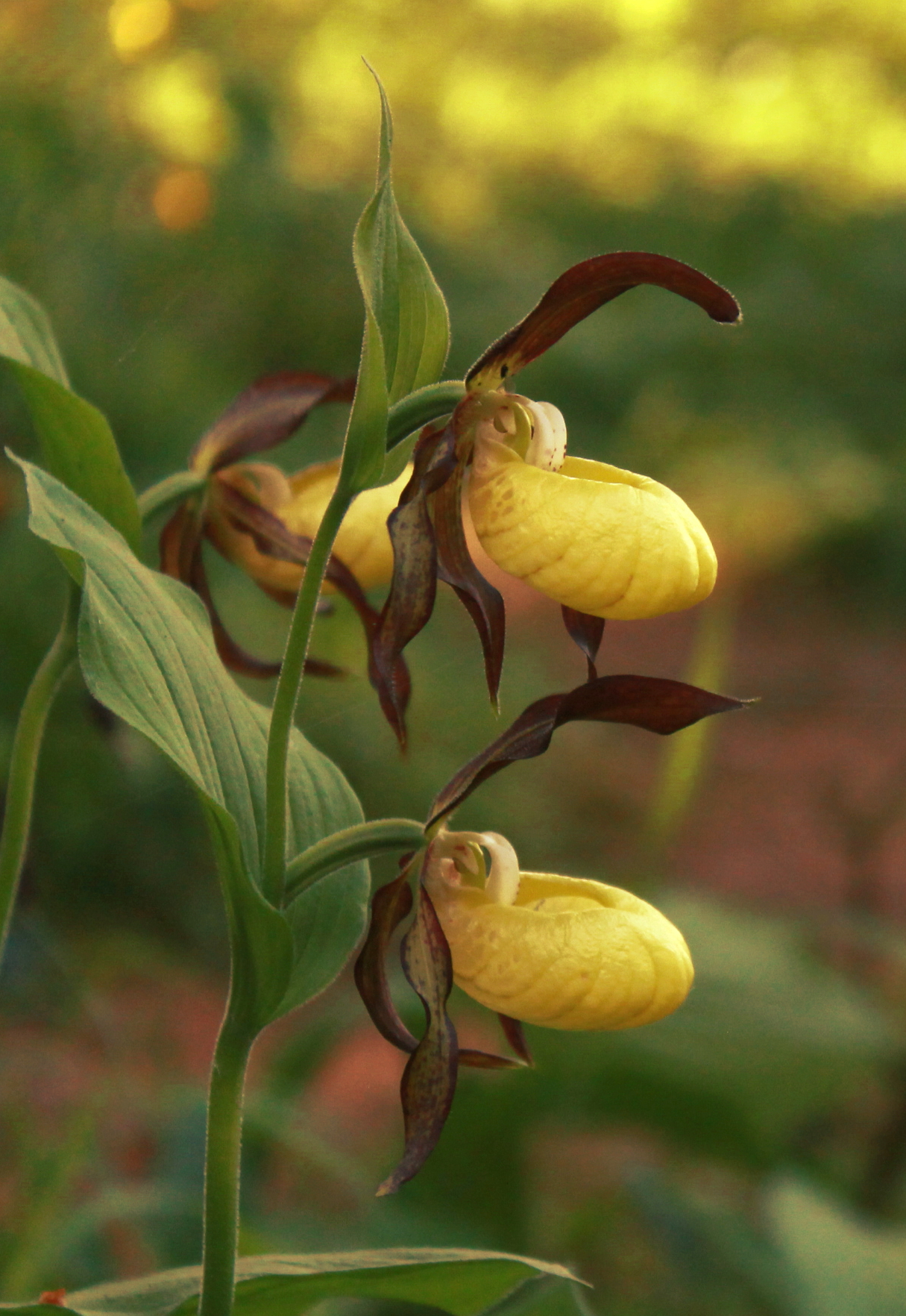
Inflorescence of C. calceolus

== Ecology ==
Cypripedium calceolus is frequently associated with stands of hazel trees.

It is pollinated by a number of different insect species, including at least seven species of miner bee in the genera Andrena and Colletes, as well as at least two species of Lasioglossum (furrow bees). Plants are highly susceptible to herbivory by slugs and snails.

Cypripedium calceolus is known to primarily associate with mycorrhizal fungi in the genus Tulasnellaceae. Specific relationships with mycorrhizal fungi are key to orchids' ability to access soil nutrients. Other suggested mycorrhizal partners include Alternaria sp., Ceratorhiza sp., Chaetomium sp., Cylindrocarpon sp., Epicoccum purpureum, Epulorhiza sp., Moniliopsis sp., Mycelium radicis atrovirens, Phoma sp. and Rhizoctonia subtilis sp.

== Conservation ==
Although the global conservation status of Cypripedium calceolus is least concern according to the IUCN Red List, in many countries (including the UK and Denmark) it has become rare and is afforded legal protection. C. calceolus is common in Poland and Austria but in Greece it has become extinct.

In Britain, the lady's-slipper orchid was formerly a reasonably widespread plant across northern England, particularly in the limestone areas of the Yorkshire Dales. By the late 20th century, however, the population had declined to just a single plant in one location in the Dales. While the virtual extinction of this species from its historical range in Britain is often blamed on uprooting by gardeners and botanists, its preferred habitat also shrank markedly due to the clearance of woodland from the limestone landscape by humans, and sheep grazing is likely to have finished it off. It became a protected species in the UK in 1975 under the Conservation of Wild Creatures and Wild Plants Act, but a reintroduction programme for the lady's-slipper orchid is in place, and has led to a population of hundreds of plants as of 2003. In June 2024 a plant was found which was the first to germinate of its own accord since 1930.

Thanks to the efforts of the Dutch plant breeder and wholesaler Anthura, which made this species and the genus commercially available in garden centres, the species has been successfully reintroduced to several locations in Switzerland at the request of the Swiss Orchid Foundation. Anthura used seeds from the Swiss population, resulting in three thousand viable plants being made available for the reintroduction. The locations are kept secret but are regularly monitored.

== In popular culture ==
Cypripedium calceolus has appeared on postage stamps in many countries including Austria, the Czech Republic, Denmark, France, the Grenadines, Hungary, Italy, Latvia, Madagascar, Moldova, Mozambique, Norway, Romania, Russia, Slovenia, Sweden, Uganda, Ukraine and the United Kingdom.

Snåsa Municipality in Norway has a Cypripedium calceolus in its coat-of-arms.

In Pavel Ivanovich Melnikov's "In the Forests", a znakharka (Russian wise woman) calls this Adam's head, Adam's grass, and Cuckoo's slippers and says it is good for every ill including driving away evil spirits.

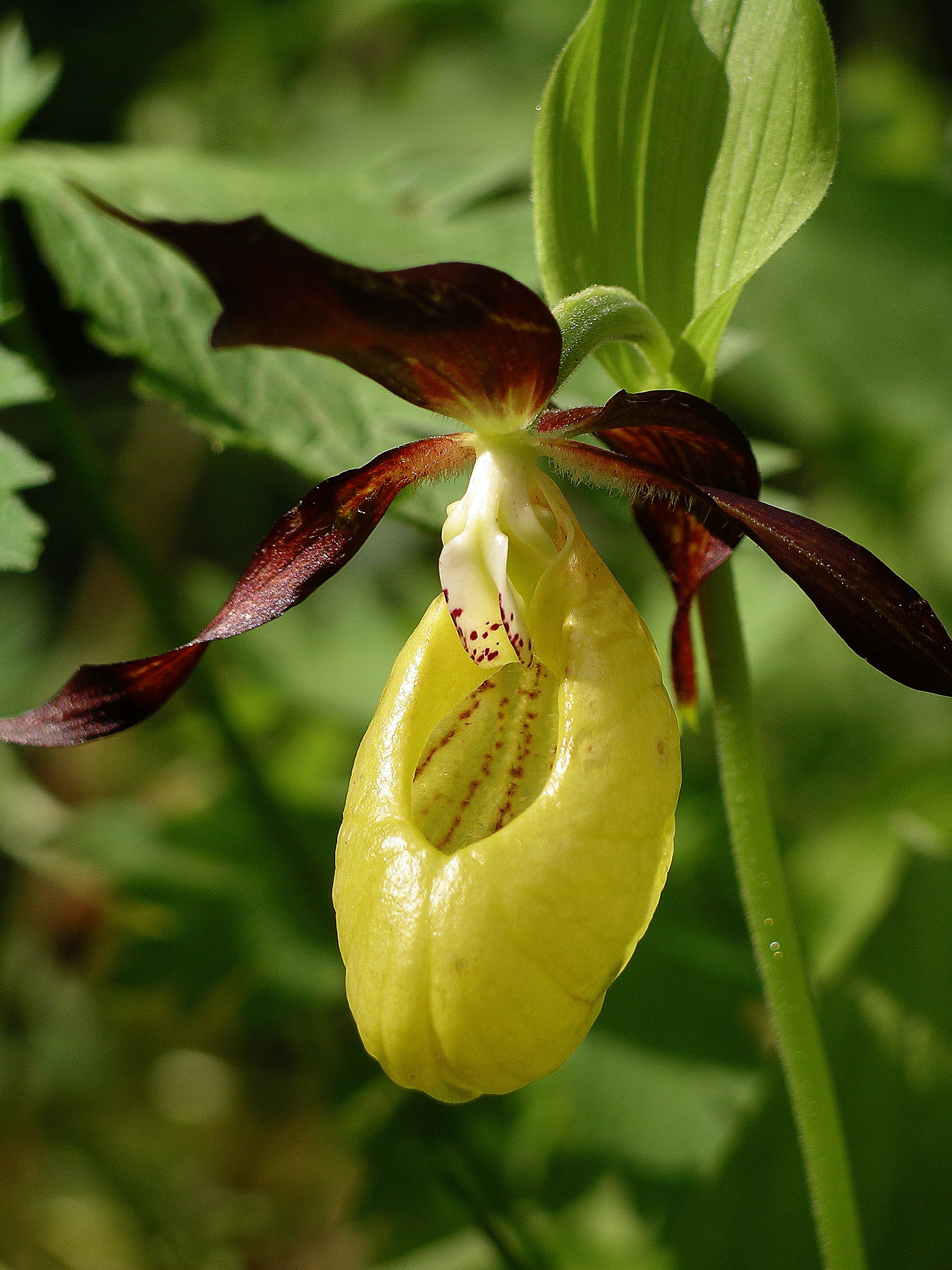
Flower in northern Sweden
