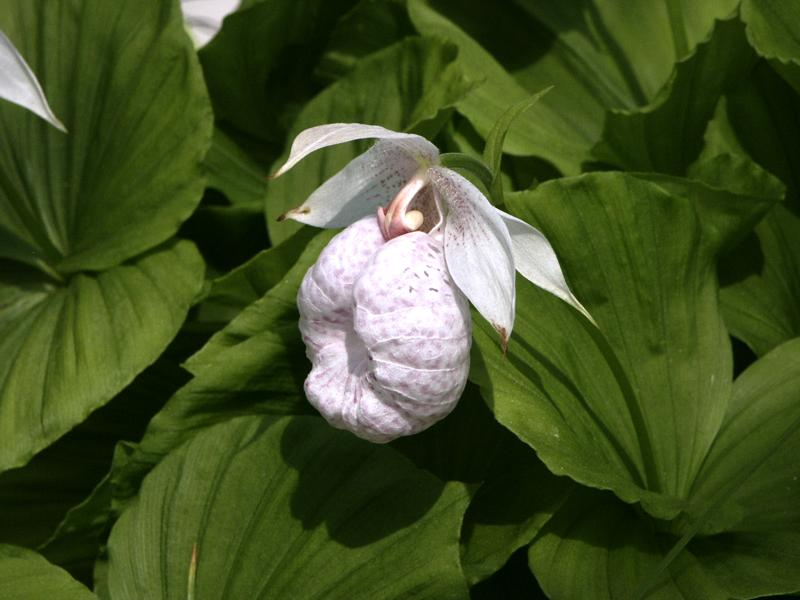

Conservation status
- Endangered (IUCN 3.1)

Scientific classification
- Kingdom: Plantae
- Clade: Embryophytes
- Clade: Tracheophytes
- Clade: Spermatophytes
- Clade: Angiosperms
- Clade: Monocots
- Order: Asparagales
- Family: Orchidaceae
- Subfamily: Cypripedioideae
- Genus: Cypripedium
- Species: C. formosanum

Binomial name
- Cypripedium formosanum Hayata (1916)

Synonyms
- Cypripedium japonicum var. formosanum (Hayata) S.S.Ying (1975)

= Cypripedium formosanum =

Species of orchid

The Formosan lady's slipper or beautiful cypripedium, Cypripedium formosanum, is a species of orchid endemic to Taiwan.

This species is restricted to the central mountains of Taiwan, where it grows in several types of habitat in mountain forests and bogs. It is associated with species of ferns, Epimedium, Trillium, and Podophyllum, and Diphylleia grayi. It is also cultivated, being attractive and easy to grow and propagate. This is especially true of in vitro efforts as researchers have been able to calculate an ideal Germination rate, 90 days after planting (DAP), which can help address the population decline issues within this species. Furthermore, the IUCN Red List suggests specific conservation actions for this species in order to reduce the harms they face such as climate change and human disturbance to their natural habitat.

== Description ==
The C. formosanum is an orchid species that has erect, smooth flowering stems (10–25 cm), originating from a rhizomatous geophyte, and grows in a Temperate climate or biome. Its leaves are plicate, spreading, flabellate, and ciliate with about 11 to 13 radiating veins. The flower is white to pink with crimson spots and presents with a curved dorsal sepal, elliptic synsepal, and spreading, deflexed petals. The column is greenish-white, with a convex, ovate staminode.

== Ecology ==
Typically, this species begins flowering in April and May in mountain forests due to being in damp, open places. After successful pollination, "ovule development and seed formation" begin in the ovary occurring between 0 DAP and 240 DAP with ideal germination rate being at 90 DAP. This is due to the placenta remaining attached to the yellowish white seeds, which are still moist, but if germination is prolonged, to about 135 DAP, results are poor. Therefore, timing of seed collection is an important factor to consider, especially for In vitro efforts, if researchers wish to cultivate this species. These findings could also be applied to ex situ conservation efforts, as seed collection, artificial propagation, and reintroduction are some of the goals of this approach.

Considering that the ideal collection is at 90 DAP, this gives researchers an ample window for seeds to be germinated and avoid abscisic acid (ABA) inhibition as it has been found to accumulate rapidly between 120 and 150 DAP. As a result, researchers now have vital information that is relevant to the cultivation of this species and can drastically improve the population of this species if the necessary precautions are taken. This would cause more flowers to be grown in areas beyond their natural habitat, helping decrease removal from the wild and population decrease concerns. Additionally, knowing when specific ABA effects begin, such as knowing that it is "synthesized in the cytosol of embryo cells" or exported to the "apoplastic region" during maturity, expands the window of germination in order to get as many mature seeds as possible.

== Conservation ==
This species is assessed as endangered on the IUCN Red List of Threatened Species since 2013. One of the biggest threats is their sensitivity to their environment, as they can be deeply impacted by sudden frosts, but also outside influences such as climate change, heavy collection, human disturbance, and infrastructure development. This has led to only "six remaining localities in the mountains of Taiwan" to naturally have this species grow, a possible explanation as to why this species is seeing a decrease in population.

While there are many conservation actions that can be taken, for this species specifically, the IUCN Red List suggests the following:

- Protect the species and their habitat by launching long-term, sustainable community-driven conservation efforts.
- Place stricter surveillance around vulnerable sites, either through installation of fences or management.
- Ensure adherence to Habitat conservation, especially from human activities such as collection, trampling, and deforestation.
- Conduct further research on the species' life cycle and ecological requirements in order to cultivate the species in controlled environments and improve Ex situ conservation efforts (e.g., artificial propagation, reintroduction, and seed collection).
