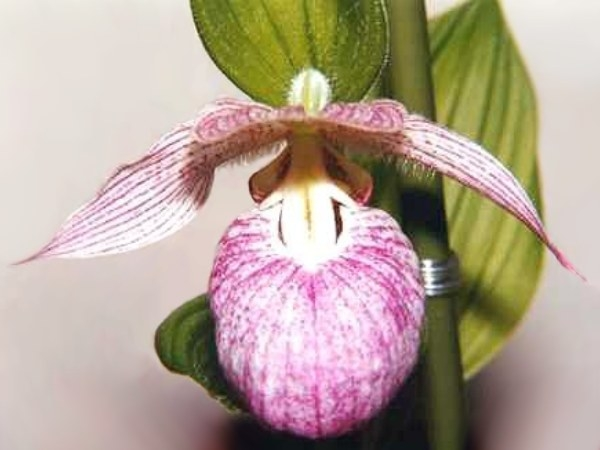

Conservation status
- Endangered (IUCN 3.1)

Scientific classification
- Kingdom: Plantae
- Clade: Tracheophytes
- Clade: Angiosperms
- Clade: Monocots
- Order: Asparagales
- Family: Orchidaceae
- Subfamily: Cypripedioideae
- Genus: Cypripedium
- Species: C. franchetii

Binomial name
- Cypripedium franchetii Rolfe (1912)

Synonyms
- Cypripedium lanuginosum Schltr. (1919); Cypripedium pulchrum Ames & Schltr. (1919); Cypripedium macranthos var. villosum Hand.-Mazz. (1936)

= Cypripedium franchetii =

Species of orchid

Cypripedium franchetii is a species of orchid endemic to China. It is known from the provinces Chongqing, Gansu, Henan, Hubei, Shaanxi, Shanxi, and Sichuan.

This species occurs in several habitat types, including open woods, scrub, and forest, growing in shade and partial shade.
