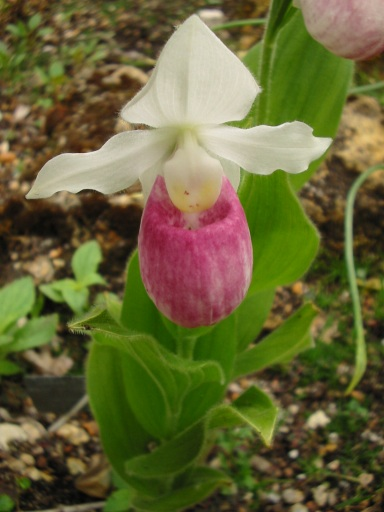
- Showy lady's slipper (Cypripedium reginae)

Scientific classification
- Kingdom: Plantae
- Clade: Tracheophytes
- Clade: Angiosperms
- Clade: Monocots
- Order: Asparagales
- Family: Orchidaceae
- Subfamily: Cypripedioideae
- Genus: Cypripedium; L., 1753

Type species
- Cypripedium calceolus L., 1753

Synonyms
- Arietinum Beck; Calceolaria Heist. ex Fabr., not to be confused with Calceolaria L.; Calceolus Mill.; Ciripedium Zumagl.; Criogenes Salisb.; Criosanthes Raf.; Cypripedilon St.-Lag. in A.Cariot; Fissipes Small; Hypodema Rchb.; Sacodon Raf.; Schizopedium Salisb.

= Cypripedium =

Genus of flowering plants in the orchid family

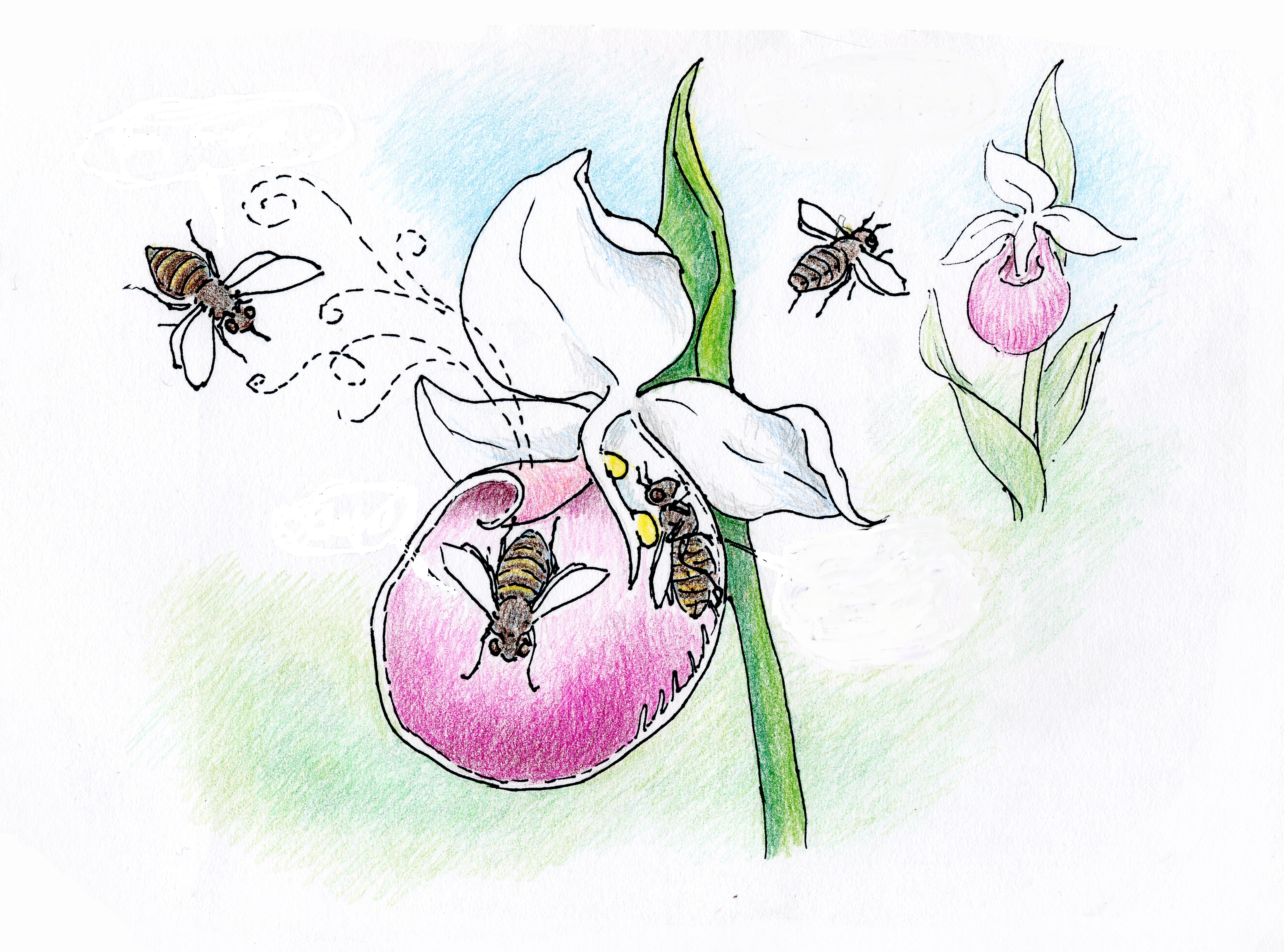
Cypripedium, trapping a bee so it goes through a narrow passage where it picks up the pollinia to perform pollination

Cypripedium is a genus of 58 species and nothospecies of hardy orchids; it is one of five genera that together compose the subfamily of lady's slipper orchids (Cypripedioideae). They are widespread across much of the Northern Hemisphere, including most of Europe and Africa (Algeria) (one species), Russia, China, Central Asia, Canada, the United States, Mexico, and Central America.

They are most commonly known as slipper orchids, lady's slipper orchids, or ladyslippers; other common names include moccasin flower, camel's foot, squirrel foot, steeple cap, Venus' shoes, and whippoorwill shoe. An abbreviation used in trade journals is "Cyp." The genus name is derived from Ancient Greek Κύπρις (Kúpris), an early reference in Greek myth to Aphrodite, and πέδιλον (pédilon), meaning "sandal". In China, it is referred to as Chinese: 杓兰, romanized: Sháo Lán, lit. 'Ladle orchid'.

Most of Cypripedium grow in temperate and subtropical climates, but some species grow in the tundra in Alaska and Siberia, which is an unusually cold habitat for orchids. Other species occur well into tropical areas such as Honduras and Myanmar.

Some of the northern species can withstand extreme cold, growing under the snow and blooming when the snow melts. But, in the wild, some have become rare and close to extinction, due to an ever shrinking natural habitat and over-collection, people prizing the flowers for their beauty. Several species are legally protected in some regions. In the late 20th century, only a single known plant of Cypripedium calceolus survived in Britain.

== Characteristics ==
The Cypripedium are terrestrial and, as with most terrestrial orchids, the rhizome is short and robust, growing in the uppermost soil layer. The rhizome grows annually with a growth bud at one end and dies off at the other end. The stem grows from the bud at the tip of the rhizome. Most slipper orchids have an elongate erect stem, with leaves growing along its length. But the mocassin flower or pink lady's slipper (Cypripedium acaule) has a short underground stem with leaves springing from the soil. The often hairy leaves can vary from ovate to elliptic or lanceolate, folded (plicate) along their length. The stems lack pseudobulbs.

The inflorescence is racemose. It can carry one to twelve flowers, as in Cypripedium californicum. But most species have one to three flowers. There are three sepals, with, in most species, the two lateral ones more or less fused. The flower has three acute petals with the third a striking slipper-shaped lip, which is lowermost. The sepals and the petals are usually similarly colored, with the lip in a different color. But variations on this theme occur. The aspect of the lip of different species can vary a great deal. As with all orchids, it is specially constructed to attract pollinators, which it traps temporarily. The flowers show a column with a unique shield-like staminode. The ovary is 3-locular (with three chambers).

== Taxonomy ==
Comparison between a DNA analysis and the morphological characteristics in this genus has shown that there is a high degree of divergence between the two, probably due to long periods of isolation or extinction of intermediate forms. The Eurasian species with yellow or red flowers form a distinct group from the North American species with yellow flowers. The Mexican pelican orchid (Cypripedium irapeanum) and the California lady's slipper (Cypripedium californicum) are probably the first diverging line. They share several similarities with their sister group Selenipedium.

=== Species and natural hybrids ===
There are 58 currently recognized species and nothospecies (naturally occurring hybrids) recognized in this genus, as of May 2014:

=== Subgenus Cypripedium ===
Section	Image	Name	Distribution
Acaulia		Cypripedium acaule – Mocassin flower, Pink lady's slipper, Two-leaved lady's slipper	C. and E. Canada, NC and E US
Arietinum		Cypripedium arietinum – Ram's-head lady's slipper	C and E Canada, NC and NE US
Arietinum		Cypripedium plectrochilum	N Myanmar to SC China
Bifolia		Cypripedium guttatum – Spotted lady's slipper	European Russia to Korea, Alaska to Yukon
Bifolia		Cypripedium yatabeanum	Russian Far East to N and NC Japan, Aleutian Islands to SW Alaska
Cypripedium		Cypripedium calceolus – Yellow lady's slipper	Europe to Japan, Algeria
Cypripedium		Cypripedium candidum – Small white lady slipper	SE Canada, NC and E US
Cypripedium		Cypripedium cordigerum – Heart-Lip lady's slipper	N Pakistan to Himalaya, S Tibet
Cypripedium		Cypripedium farreri	China
Cypripedium		Cypripedium fasciolatum	China
Cypripedium		Cypripedium henryi – Henry's lady's slipper	C China
Cypripedium		Cypripedium kentuckiense – Kentucky lady's slipper, Southern lady's slipper	C and E US
Cypripedium		Cypripedium montanum – Large lady's slipper, Mountain lady's slipper, White lady's slipper, Moccasin flower	Alaska to California
Cypripedium		Cypripedium parviflorum Salisb. – (Greater) yellow lady's slipper, moccasin flower, or hairy yellow ladyslipper	Canada, E US
Cypripedium		Cypripedium segawai	EC Taiwan
Cypripedium		Cypripedium shanxiense	China to N Japan
Eniantopedilum		Cypripedium fasciculatum – Brownie lady's slipper, Clustered lady's slipper	W US
Flabellinervia		Cypripedium japonicum – Japan lady's slipper	China, Korea, Japan
Flabellinervia		Cypripedium formosanum – Formosa lady's slipper	C Taiwan
Macrantha		Cypripedium calcicola	China
Macrantha		Cypripedium franchetii – Franchet's lady's slipper	C and SC China
Macrantha		Cypripedium himalaicum	SE Tibet to Himalaya
Macrantha		Cypripedium ludlowii	SE Tibet
Macrantha		Cypripedium macranthos – Large-flowered lady's slipper	E Belarus to temperate E Asia
Macrantha		Cypripedium taibaiense	China
Macrantha		Cypripedium taiwanalpinum	Taiwan
Macrantha		Cypripedium tibeticum	Sikkim to C China
Macrantha		Cypripedium yunnanense	SE Tibet, China
Retinervia		Cypripedium elegans	E Nepal to China
Retinervia		Cypripedium debile – Frail lady's slipper	Japan, Taiwan, China
Retinervia		Cypripedium palangshanense	China
Sinopedilum		Cypripedium bardolphianum	China
Sinopedilum		Cypripedium forrestii	China
Sinopedilum		Cypripedium micranthum	China
Trigonopedia		Cypripedium daweishanense (S.C.Chen and Z.J.Liu) S.C.Chen and Z.J.Liu (2005)	Yunnan, China South-Central
Trigonopedia		Cypripedium fargesii	China
Trigonopedia		Cypripedium lentiginosum	China
Trigonopedia		Cypripedium lichiangense S.C.Chen and P.J.Cribb	China (SW Sichuan, NW Yunnan), NE Myanmar
Trigonopedia		Cypripedium malipoense S.C.Chen and Z.J.Liu	Yunnan, China South-Central
Trigonopedia		Cypripedium margaritaceum – Pearl-white lady's slipper	China
Trigonopedia		Cypripedium sichuanense	China
Trigonopedia		Cypripedium wumengense	China (NE. Yunnan)

=== Subgenus Irapeana ===
Section	Image	Name	Distribution
Irapeana		Cypripedium californicum – California lady's slipper	Oregon, N. California
Irapeana		Cypripedium conzattianum	Mexico (Colima)
Irapeana		Cypripedium gomezianum	Mexico (Colima)
Irapeana		Cypripedium luzmarianum	Mexico (Jalisco, Michoacán)
Irapeana		Cypripedium molle	Mexico
Irapeana		Cypripedium dickinsonianum	Mexico (S Chiapas) to Guatemala
Irapeana		Cypripedium irapeanum – Pelican Orchid, Irapeao lady's slipper	Mexico to Honduras
Irapeana		Cypripedium susanae	Mexico (Nayarit)
Obtusipetala		Cypripedium flavum – Yellow lady's slipper	SE Tibet, SC China
Obtusipetala		Cypripedium passerinum – Franklyn's lady's slipper, small white Northern lady's slipper, sparrow's egg lady's slipper	Alaska to Canada, Montana
Obtusipetala		Cypripedium reginae Walter – Large white lady's slipper, Queen's lady's slipper, showy lady's slipper	C and E Canada, E. US
Subtropica		Cypripedium subtropicum	SE. Tibet
Subtropica		Cypripedium wardii	SE. Tibet, China

== Natural Hybrids ==
Image	Scientific name	Common name	Distribution
	Cypripedium × alaskanum	C. guttatum × C. yatabeanum	Alaska
	Cypripedium × andrewsii	C. candidum × C. parviflorum	E Canada, NC and NE US
	Cypripedium × catherinae	C. macranthon × C. shanxiense	Russian Far East
	Cypripedium × columbianum	C. montanum × C. parviflorum var. pubescens	W Canada, NW US
	Cypripedium x herae	C.parviflorum × C.reginae	Manitoba, Canada
	Cypripedium × ventricosum	C. calceolus × C. macranthos	Russia to Korea
	Cypripedium × wenqingiae	C. farreri × C. tibeticum	China

== Uses ==
The genus has a long history of use, dating back 2,500 years to the Far East, where they were used medicinally.

== Conservation ==
Several orchid species thought to be extinct in the United Kingdom including one native species in this genus have been found in habitat and are currently the subject of aggressive conservation efforts to protect and restore these showy plants to their native ranges.

== Awards ==
The following have received the Royal Horticultural Society's Award of Garden Merit:

- Cypripedium formosanum
- Cypripedium Hank Small gx
- Cypripedium Michael gx
- Cypripedium reginae
- Cypripedium Sabine gx
