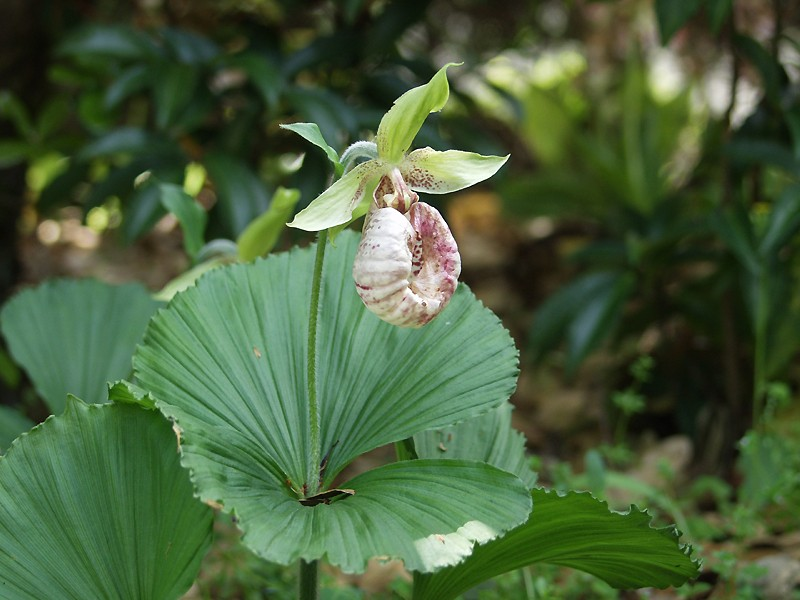

Conservation status
- Endangered (IUCN 3.1)

Scientific classification
- Kingdom: Plantae
- Clade: Tracheophytes
- Clade: Angiosperms
- Clade: Monocots
- Order: Asparagales
- Family: Orchidaceae
- Subfamily: Cypripedioideae
- Genus: Cypripedium
- Species: C. japonicum

Binomial name
- Cypripedium japonicum Thunb. (1784)

Synonyms
- Cypripedium cathayenum S.S.Chien (1930); Cypripedium japonicum var. glabrum M. Suzuki (1980)

= Cypripedium japonicum =

Species of orchid

Cypripedium japonicum, known as the Japanese cypripedium and Korean lady's slipper, is a species of orchid. It is native to Japan, Korea and China (Anhui, Gansu, Guizhou, Hubei, Hunan, Jiangxi, Shaanxi, Sichuan, Zhejiang).
