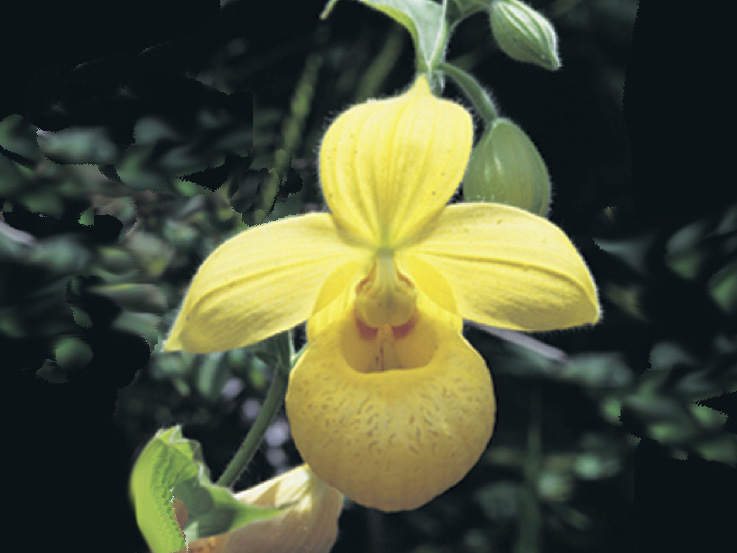

Scientific classification
- Kingdom: Plantae
- Clade: Tracheophytes
- Clade: Angiosperms
- Clade: Monocots
- Order: Asparagales
- Family: Orchidaceae
- Subfamily: Cypripedioideae
- Genus: Cypripedium
- Species: C. irapeanum

Binomial name
- Cypripedium irapeanum Lex. (1825)

Synonyms
- Cypripedium lexarzae Scheidw. (1839); Cypripedium splendidum Scheidw. (1839); Cypripedium turgidum Sessé & Moc. (1890); Cypripedium luzmarianum R. González & R. Ramírez (1992)

= Cypripedium irapeanum =

Species of orchid

Cypripedium irapeanum, known as Irapeao's cypripedium or pelican orchid, is a species of orchid found in Mexico and Central America in section irapeana. It is widely distributed from the central Mexico states of Sinaloa and Durango south to Guatemala and Honduras. They are found in mixed pine and oak forests on well-drained limestone slopes and in areas with volcanic and clay soil rich in metals. They can be found in some areas in groups of hundreds. They bloom from early June to late July.

The plant is tall, 1 to 1.5 m, and is pubescent with clasping elliptic to lanceolate cauline leaves in a single stem. The showy yellow flowers are 12 cm and open from bottom to top in a raceme of one to eight flowers. The balloon-shaped lip has a fine net pattern and an open bowl with an enrolled margin. There are purple-brown spots toward the rear of the bowl. They propagate both by rhizomes and from many minute seeds that are propelled from a capsule that erupts from the inferior ovary.

Some people have reported contact dermatitis after handling these plants, and they are extremely difficult to cultivate as they rely on a symbiotic fungus for nutrients.
