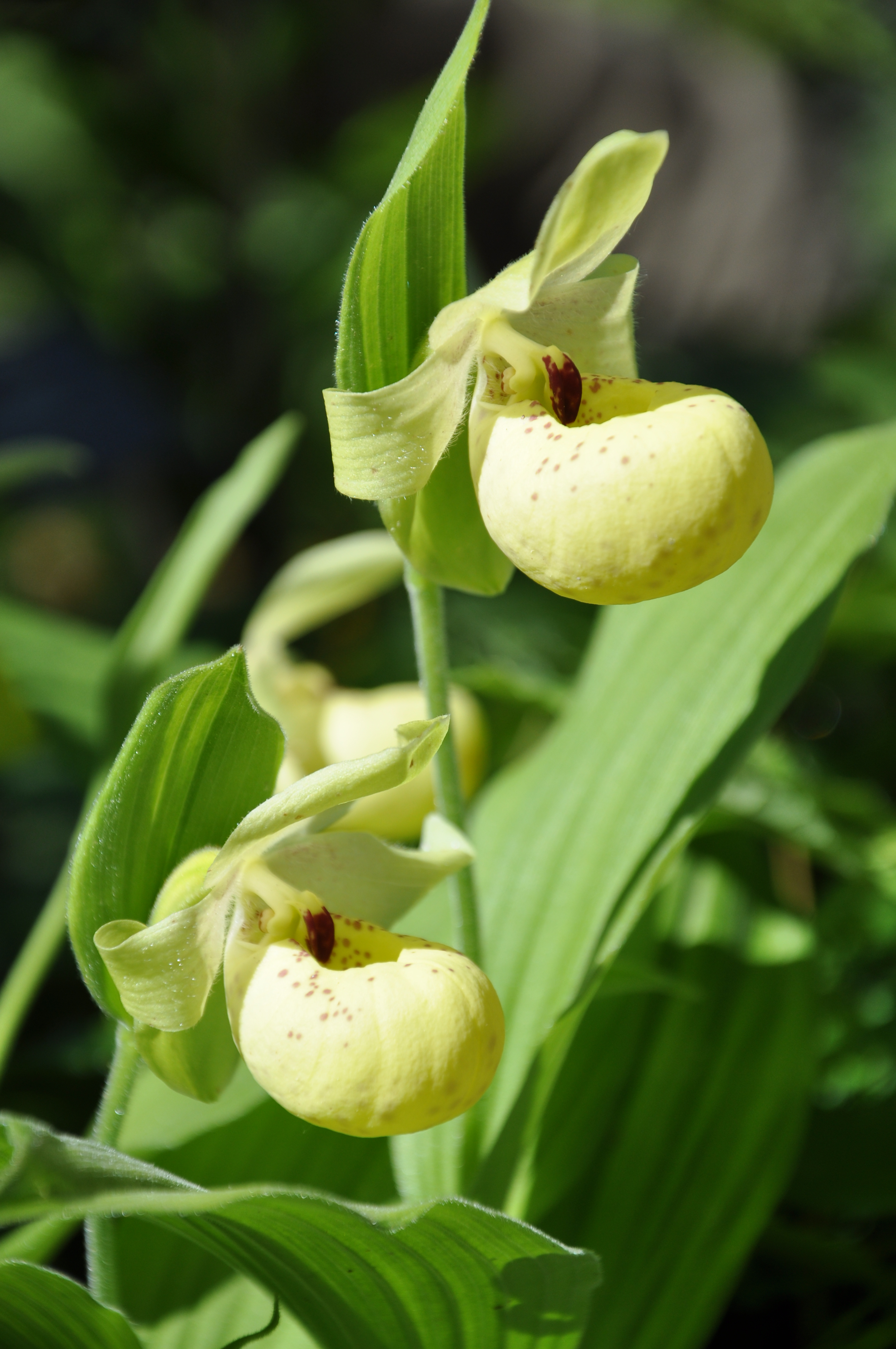

Conservation status
- Vulnerable (IUCN 3.1)

Scientific classification
- Kingdom: Plantae
- Clade: Tracheophytes
- Clade: Angiosperms
- Clade: Monocots
- Order: Asparagales
- Family: Orchidaceae
- Subfamily: Cypripedioideae
- Genus: Cypripedium
- Species: C. flavum

Binomial name
- Cypripedium flavum P.F. Hunt & Summerh. (1966)

Synonyms
- Cypripedium luteum Franch., 1888, illegitimate homonym not Raf. 1828

= Cypripedium flavum =

Yellow cypripedium

Species of orchid

Cypripedium flavum, the yellow cypripedium, is a species of orchid. It is endemic to China, found in the provinces of Gansu, Hubei, Sichuan, Xizang (Tibet), and Yunnan.

The species epithet flavum is Latin for yellow and indicates its flower colour.
