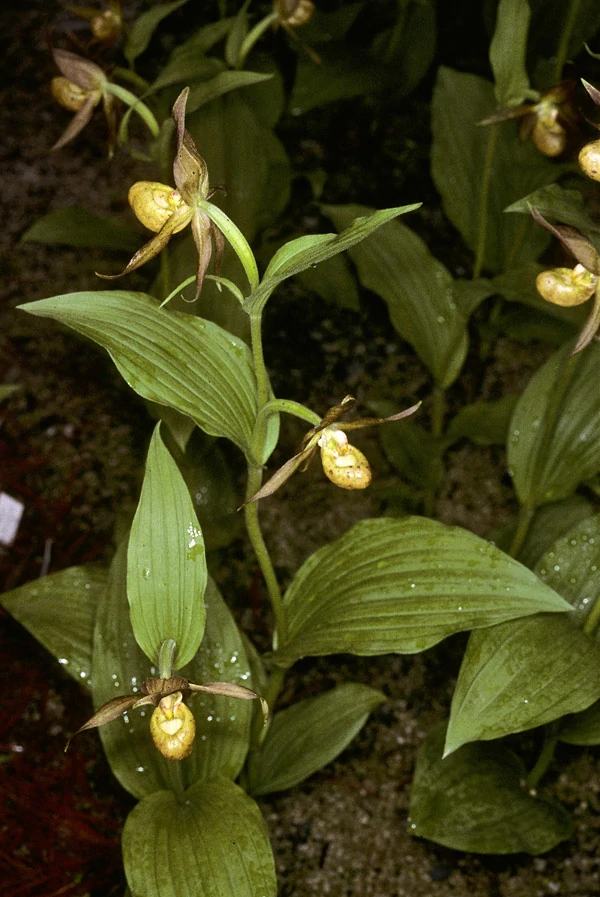

Conservation status
- Near Threatened (IUCN 3.1)

Scientific classification
- Kingdom: Plantae
- Clade: Tracheophytes
- Clade: Angiosperms
- Clade: Monocots
- Order: Asparagales
- Family: Orchidaceae
- Subfamily: Cypripedioideae
- Genus: Cypripedium
- Species: C. shanxiense

Binomial name
- Cypripedium shanxiense S. C. Chen (1983)

= Cypripedium shanxiense =

Species of orchid

Cypripedium shanxiense is a species of Cypripedium. It is found in China, northern Japan and the Russian Far East.

The internal structure of mature seeds is simple, there are internal and external double-layered skin, no endosperm; the embryo body is a spherical embryo.
