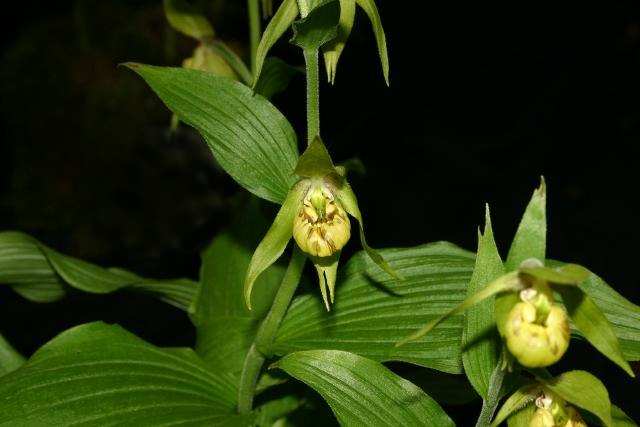

Conservation status
- Vulnerable (IUCN 3.1)

Scientific classification
- Kingdom: Plantae
- Clade: Tracheophytes
- Clade: Angiosperms
- Clade: Monocots
- Order: Asparagales
- Family: Orchidaceae
- Subfamily: Cypripedioideae
- Genus: Cypripedium
- Species: C. henryi

Binomial name
- Cypripedium henryi Rolfe, 1892

Synonyms
- Cypripedium chinense Franch., 1894

= Cypripedium henryi =

Species of orchid

Cypripedium henryi, Henry's cypripedium, is a species of orchid endemic to China. It is found in southern Gansu, Guizhou, western Hubei, southern Shaanxi, southern Shanxi, Sichuan, and northwestern to southeastern Yunnan. It grown in humus-rich places in open forests, at forest margins, or on scrubby slopes at elevations of 800–2,800 m (2,600–9,200 ft) above sea level.
