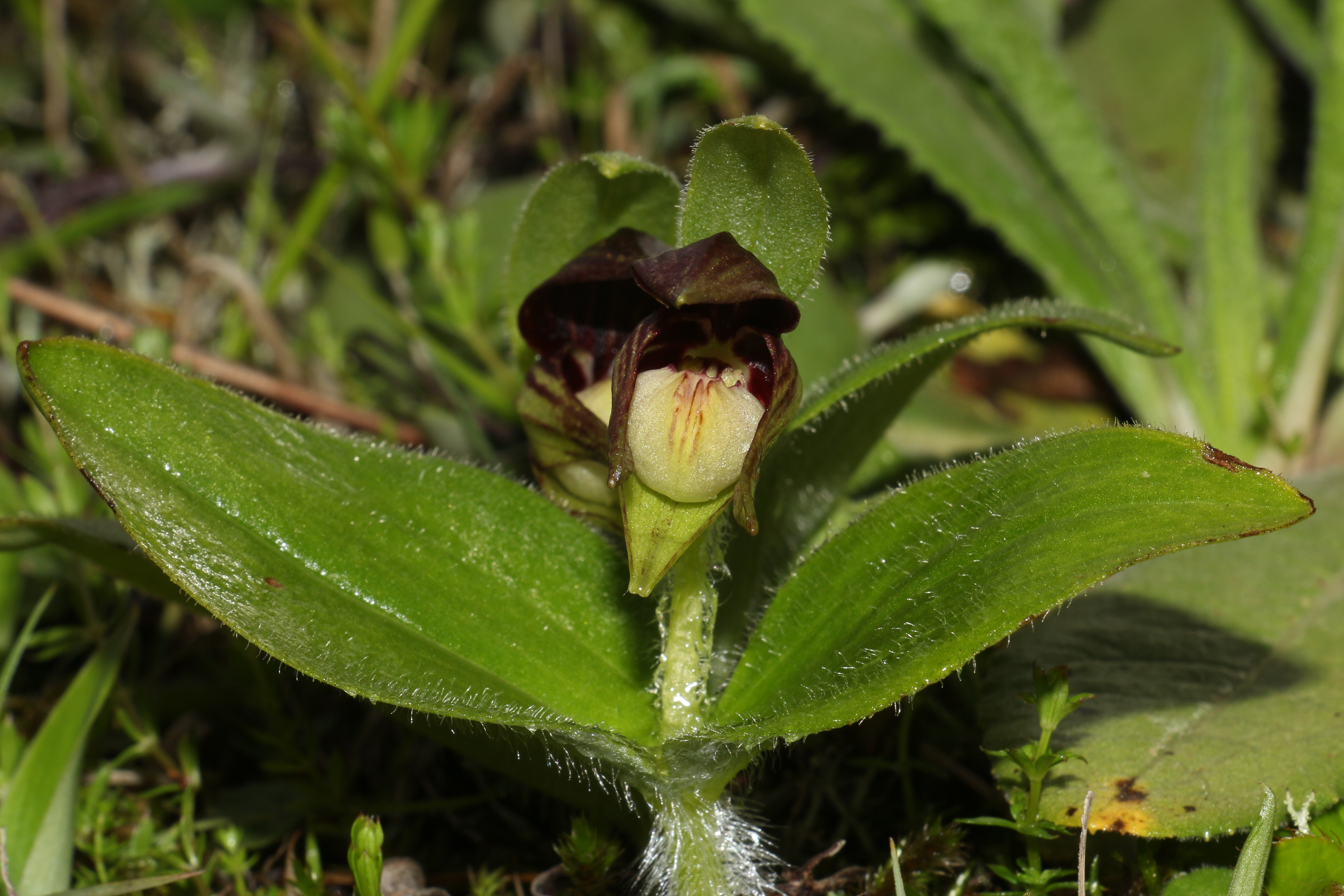

Conservation status
- Endangered (IUCN 3.1)

Scientific classification
- Kingdom: Plantae
- Clade: Tracheophytes
- Clade: Angiosperms
- Clade: Monocots
- Order: Asparagales
- Family: Orchidaceae
- Subfamily: Cypripedioideae
- Genus: Cypripedium
- Species: C. elegans

Binomial name
- Cypripedium elegans Rchb.f. (1886)

Synonyms
- Coelogyne elegans Rchb.f.

= Cypripedium elegans =

Species of orchid

Cypripedium elegans is a lady's-slipper orchid found in Nepal, Bhutan, the Indian Himalayas, Tibet, and Yunnan. It grows in thickets, forest margins and humus rich soil in forests.
