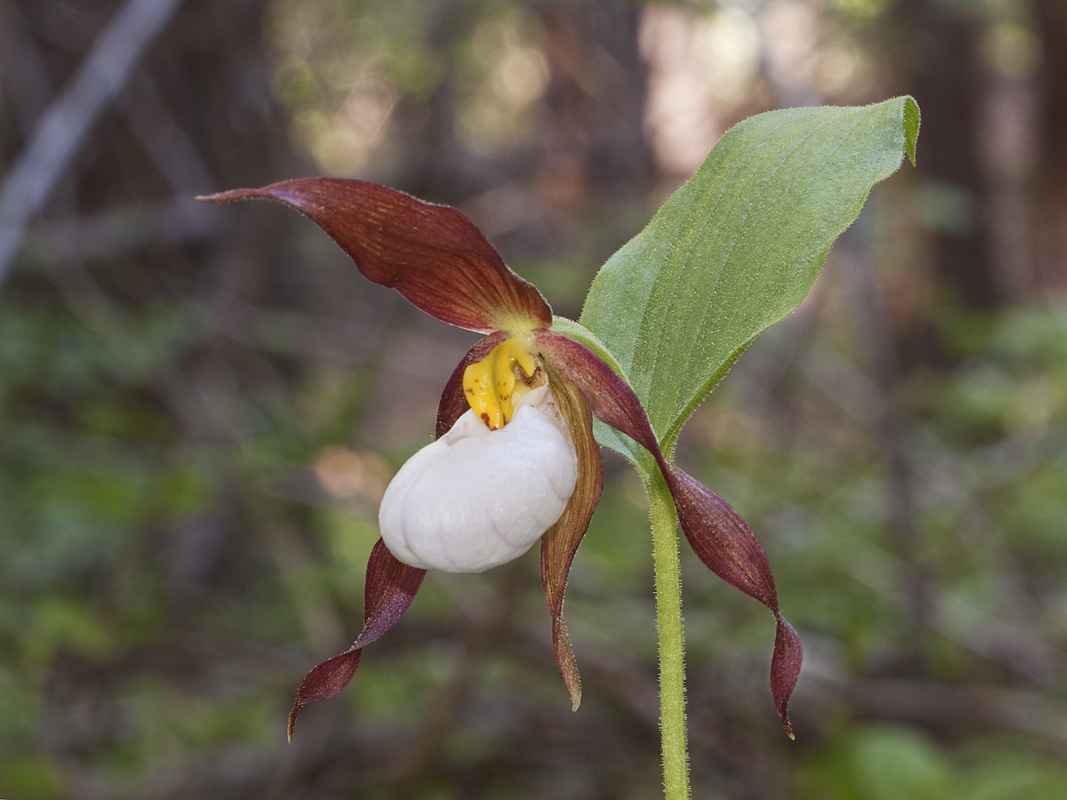

Conservation status
- Apparently Secure (NatureServe)

- Vulnerable (IUCN 3.1)

Scientific classification
- Kingdom: Plantae
- Clade: Tracheophytes
- Clade: Angiosperms
- Clade: Monocots
- Order: Asparagales
- Family: Orchidaceae
- Subfamily: Cypripedioideae
- Genus: Cypripedium
- Species: C. montanum

Binomial name
- Cypripedium montanum Douglas ex Lindl.

Synonyms
- Cypripedium montanum f. praetertinctum Sheviak; Cypripedium montanum f. welchii P.M.Br.; Cypripedium occidentale S. Watson

= Cypripedium montanum =

Species of orchid

Cypripedium montanum is a member of the orchid genus Cypripedium. It is commonly known as large lady's slipper, mountain lady's slipper, white lady's slipper as well as moccasin flower. This latter is also the common name of Cypripedium acaule.

== Description ==
Cypripedium montanum grows to be up to 70 cm (30 in) tall. The stem has alternating, plicate leaves. Atop the stem sits one to three large flowers. The sepals and petals tend to be maroon-brown while the pouch is white. This species is a close ally of Cypripedium parviflorum, so they appear to be very similar with the main difference being pouch color.

== Range ==
Cypripedium montanum can be found in the northwestern United States and western Canada. It is reported from California, Oregon, Washington, Idaho, Montana, Wyoming, Saskatchewan, Alberta, British Columbia and Alaska. It is usually found at high elevation in open woods and subalpine slopes. Meriwether Lewis noted this species during his expedition while in Western Montana near Lolo Creek.
