= Wagner Natural Area =

Protected wetland area in Alberta, Canada

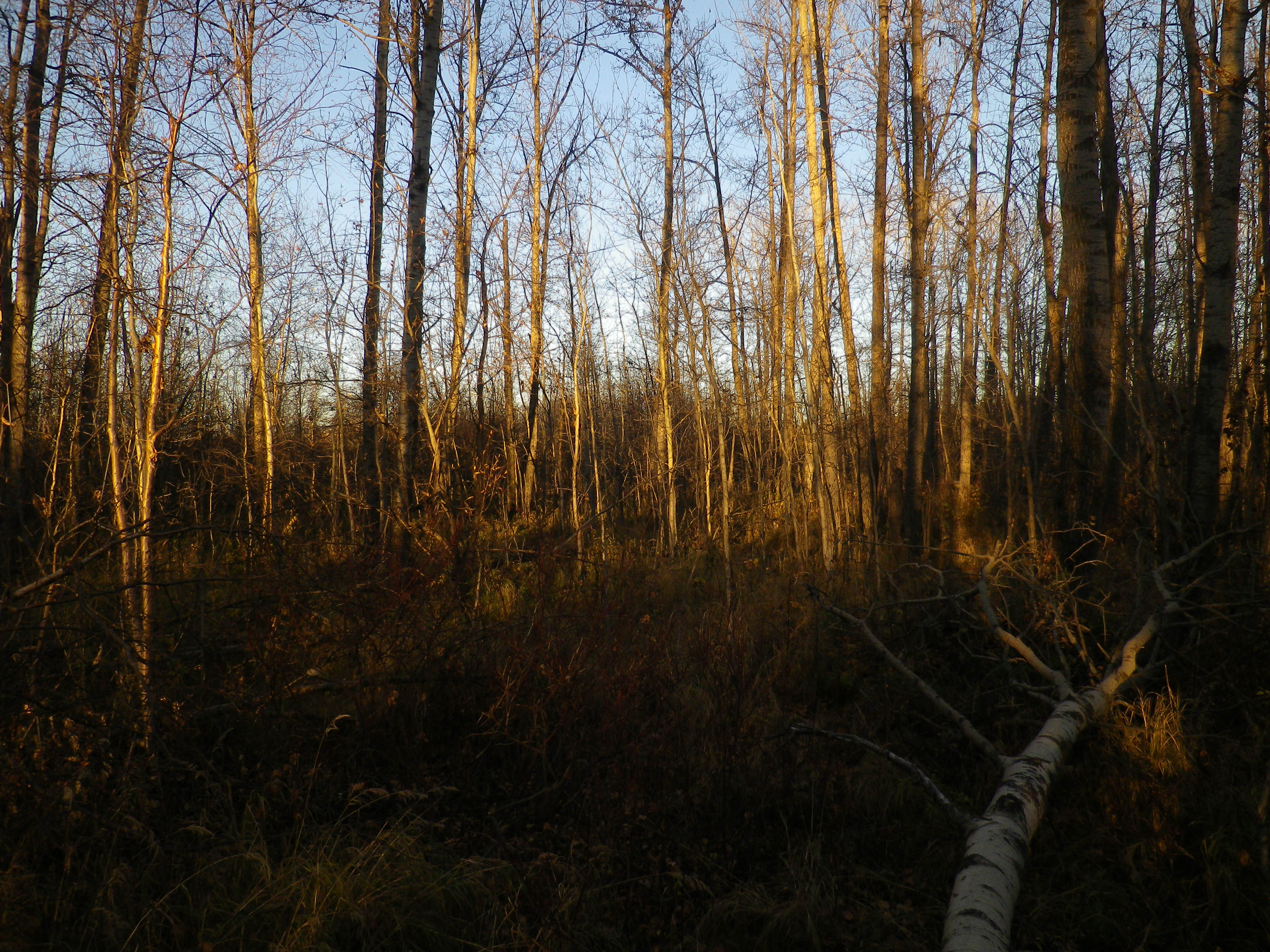
- Western area of Wagner Natural Area

- Location within Alberta
- Nearest city: Edmonton, Alberta
- Coordinates: 53°33′50″N 113°49′10″W
- Area: 1.3 km^{2} (0.50 sq mi)
- Established: 1987
- Named for: William Wagner
- Website: Official website

Wagner Natural Area is a provincially designated protected area in the Canadian province of Alberta, 8 kilometres (5.0 mi) west of Edmonton. It contains 130 hectares (320 acres) of land and predominantly comprises calcareous fens alongside marl ponds, wetland meadows, and forests of black spruce and tamarack. In 1987, it was designated as a Natural Area under the Wilderness Areas, Ecological Reserves, Natural Areas and Heritage Rangelands Act. Purchased by the Alberta provincial government in 1971, it is administered by the Wagner Natural Area Society (WNAS) and the Natural Resources Service of Alberta Environment. The most important feature of the area are the fens, which are now uncommon around Edmonton. The designation of the site as a natural area was primarily for the preservation of the fens. However one issue unresolved by the protective designation is that most of the groundwater reservoirs that feed the fens are outside of the Wagner Natural Area itself.

Although bogs and fens are not uncommon in Alberta, Wagner Natural Area is notable as the only mineral-rich fen within 160 kilometres (99 mi) of Edmonton and one of the only sites east of the Rocky Mountains and south of Fort McMurray. As a result of its unique biophysical properties, unusually high biodiversity for an area of its size, and convenient location to major population centres, Wagner Natural Area is one of the most extensively studied natural areas in Alberta. It is also recognized as an Ecological Monitoring and Assessment Network site.

== History ==
The fen of Wagner Natural Area is estimated to be 4,700 years old.

The majority of what is now the Wagner Natural Area was deeded to the Canadian Pacific Railway (CPR) by the government of Canada in 1901. It remained held by the railway until Frederick Wagner purchased it in 1926. Wagner intended to log the coniferous forest and use it for pasturing dairy cows. Although forty acres of wetlands were cleared and filled by the Wagner family, the plan was ultimately unsuccessful, possibly due to sinkholes or the presence of seaside arrow-grass, which can be toxic to cattle and taint their milk. Wagner sued the CPR due to their plans to dynamite the area in order to mine the marl to make cement. When oil was discovered in nearby Leduc, in 1946, Frederick Wagner's son, William, clashed with the growing Alberta energy industry, although Shell and Imperial Oil drilled several boreholes on what would be the eastern boundary of the area. The Wagner family maintained ownership of the area until December 1971.

The site was purchased by the Land Assembly Division of Alberta Environment to be used for educational purposes. Funding for the purchase came from the Nature Conservancy of Canada, graduate students and faculty from the University of Alberta, an anonymous foundation donation, and the government of Alberta. Wagner Natural Area was the Nature Conservancy of Canada's first acquisition in Alberta. After its purchase, it was transferred to the Natural Areas Program in the Public Lands Division in 1975. Until February 1987, it was administrated under the Public Lands Act; in 1983, the site was leased to the Wagner Natural Area Society.

== Ecology ==
Wagner Natural Area is in the northwestern portion of the Central Parkland Sub-Region within the Parkland Natural Region. Peatlands, such as Wagner, are uncommon within this sub-region, as it approaches the southern geographical limit of distribution due to microclimate and edaphic influences. Wagner Natural Area sits within the wettest part of the sub-region, due to available moisture increasing along a gradient from the southeast to northwest. The area sits atop the Horseshoe Canyon Formation. As a result of Pleistocene glaciation, sand and gravel deposits form the major aquifer in Wagner Natural Area. South of the site, there is a catchment area that receives precipitation from rainfall and snowmelt. This moves downwards through the aquifer and dissolves some of the calcium-rich sediment. Parts of the ground dips below the water surface and forms a number of springs which are rich in calcium carbonate – these form the marl ponds of Wagner Natural Area. The precipitation of the calcium carbonate in the open ponds of water equilibrates with the atmosphere, resulting in an oversaturation of calcium carbonate in the water that is held in check by an increased carbon dioxide concentration. The excess carbon dioxide is removed from the water by many of species of Chara, a genus of algae found in the area. The spring water remains at a temperature around 4 °C (39 °F) year round, preventing the deep frost from freezing the area during harsh Alberta winters.

=== Public access ===
The WNAS was formed in 1983 and maintains the area for the public. Entry is free. There is a 1.5 kilometre trail that loops around the marl ponds and includes benches, outhouses, a picnic shelter, and a boardwalk to prevent damage to the fen itself.

== Conservation ==
The Edmonton Bird Club began using the site for birdwatching purposes in the 1950s. The first attempted ecological survey of the area was completed in 1972 by Dr. George LaRoi and Mr. Raszewski from the University of Alberta. Since then, formal and informal studies have been done by students from the university, members of the WNAS, specialists, and volunteers. In 1985, the site was selected for a survey of its arthropod fauna. Though only 130 hectares, the study sample found 2181 species of arthropods, the majority of the 2,905 species identified in the peatland. Of these, 1410 belonged to the order Hymenoptera, which includes bees, wasps, and ants. The survey identified 230 species of spiders, 20 of which had never been previously identified. The area provides, or at one time provided, habitat for at least 3 species of fish, 6 species of herptiles, 138 species of birds, including a nesting colony of Bonaparte's gulls, and 41 species of mammals. Overall, it is estimated that the Wagner Natural Area contains about 6,000 species of arthropods.

The sparrow's egg lady slipper, an endangered species of orchid, is found in Wagner Natural Area, along with fifteen other species of orchid; these represent 16 of the 26 orchid species found in Alberta. The 317 species of vascular plants found in Wagner Natural Area are one-sixth of all such species in Alberta. Fourteen of the plant species found in Wagner Natural Area are tracked by the Alberta Natural Heritage Information Centre (ANHIC).

=== Threats ===
The groundwater of the Wagner Natural Area is increasingly threatened by urbanization of the surrounding areas. The major threats to the stability of the natural flow of groundwater are industrial developments that can impact water quality; residential developments that utilize groundwater wells and septic systems; developments in the discharge area, such as drainage and ditching, that could lower water levels; and industrial developments in the recharge area that increase surface water flow out of the Wagner Natural Area.

In 1988, Alberta Transportation announced its intention to build a road connecting the Yellowhead Highway to a new bypass in Edmonton. This proposal would have blocked the flow of groundwater into the fen. With the support of Peter Lee, an environmentally-minded supporter in Alberta Transportation, the WNAS forced Alberta Transportation to do an environmental impact assessment, the first in the department's history. Ecologist Matthew Fairbarns was hired to search for the rare bog adder's-mouth orchid along where the road would have been placed. Eventually, recognizing the biodiversity within the site, the connecting road was relocated.

In recent years, the marl ponds in Wagner have been drying up earlier than in previous years. This is possibly due to the development in the surrounding areas, drought, or climate change.

In 2007, the Parkland County considered a draft proposal to rezone the lands along its southern boundary, including Wagner Natural Area, from agricultural to industrial. The construction of roads, sewers, and water lines would have a severe negative impact on Wagner as a wetland because, as a fen as opposed to a bog, it is dependent on groundwater sources, most of which are outside of the protected borders of the area.

In 2019, the city of Edmonton pled guilty to violations of the Environmental Protection and Enhancement Act for spraying Hyvar X-L, a federally regulated herbicide that is not intended for residential areas, on sidewalks in a southwestern residential neighbourhood near Wagner Natural Area. Part of the $165,000 CAD settlement will go towards an Edmonton Native Plant Society initiative to enhance the area.
