= Cypripedium molle =

Scientific classification
- Kingdom: Plantae
- Clade: Tracheophytes
- Clade: Angiosperms
- Clade: Monocots
- Order: Asparagales
- Family: Orchidaceae
- Subfamily: Cypripedioideae
- Genus: Cypripedium
- Species: C. molle

Binomial name
- Cypripedium molle Lindl. in G.Bentham

Synonyms
- Cypripedium irapeanum subsp. molle (Lindl.) Eccarius

Species of orchid

Cypripedium molle is a species of orchid native to Puebla and Oaxaca, Mexico.

Cypripedium molle can have as many as 12 stems, each bearing up to 5 pale yellow flowers.
