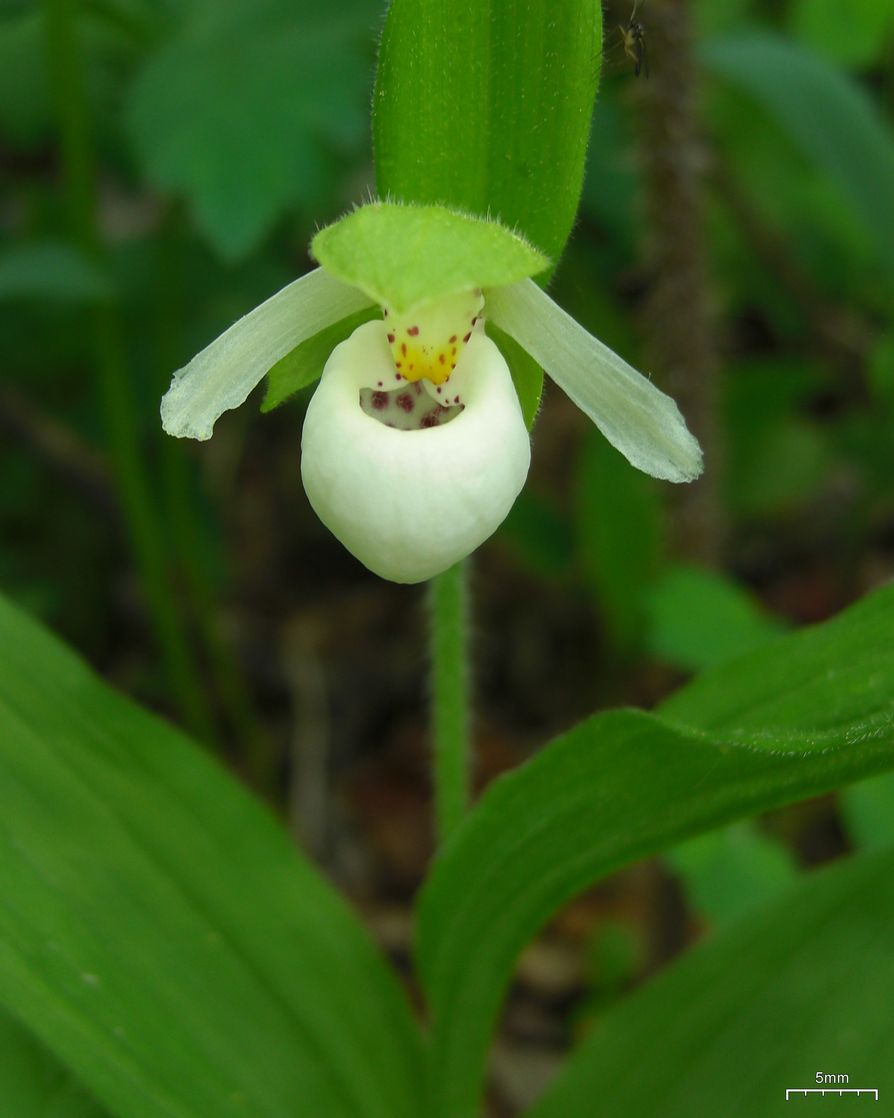

Conservation status
- Vulnerable (IUCN 3.1)

- Secure (NatureServe)

Scientific classification
- Kingdom: Plantae
- Clade: Tracheophytes
- Clade: Angiosperms
- Clade: Monocots
- Order: Asparagales
- Family: Orchidaceae
- Subfamily: Cypripedioideae
- Genus: Cypripedium
- Species: C. passerinum

Binomial name
- Cypripedium passerinum Richardson

= Cypripedium passerinum =

Sparrow's-egg lady's-slipper

Species of orchid

Cypripedium passerinum is a species of lady's slipper orchid known by the common names sparrow's-egg lady's-slipper, spotted lady's-slipper, and Franklin's lady's-slipper.

== Description ==
This orchid is a rhizomatous monocot, perennial herb growing to a maximum height around 50 centimetres (20 inches). There are 3 to 7 oval or lance-shaped leaves arranged alternately on the stem, each up to 19 centimetres (7.5 inches) long by 6 cm (2.4 in) wide. The herbage is hairy and sticky. The inflorescence at the top of the stem contains one or two flowers. The flower has a dorsal sepal covering the petals and two lateral sepals. There are three petals: two flat white petals on either side and one central petal modified into a white or pink-tinged pouch with purplish spotting at the lip and inside, which is said to resemble a sparrow's egg. The fruit is a capsule. The plant may reproduce by seed but it more often reproduces vegetatively by sending up more stems from the rhizome.

== Habitat ==
This species grows farther north than other Cypripedium. It grows in moist spruce forests at low elevations, tundra, dunes, and river terraces, lakeshores, and streambanks. It often grows on calcareous substrates. It is associated with plants such as white spruce (Picea glauca), Engelmann spruce (P. engelmannii), western redcedar (Thuja occidentalis), red-osier dogwood (Cornus sericea), willows (Salix spp.), horsetail (Equisetum spp.), longtube twinflower (Linnaea borealis), sedges (Carex spp.), one-sided pyrola (Orthilia secunda), and moss carpet (Pleurozium schreberi).

== Range ==
Cypripedium passerinum is native to northern North America. It is widespread in Canada from British Columbia to Quebec, as well as all three northern territories. It also is found Alaska and in the Rocky Mountains of Montana, including inside Glacier National Park.

== Importance to the ecosystem ==
Little is known about the importance of C. passerinum to the ecosystem. In some studies, it has been noted that insects (e.g., moths, sawfly, and a leaf miner) have fed on them. Bees have been identified to pollinate other Cypripedium however unlike other Cypripedium, C. passerinum is self pollinating and therefore does not require a pollinator for reproduction. A variety of species grow with the sparrow's-egg lady-slipper, such as Linnaea borealis, Carex concinna, Orthilia secunda, and Pleurozium schreberi.

== Conservation ==
Cypripedium passerinum is an extremely rare plant in certain areas. Its highly specific habitat requirements contribute to its risk of extinction. In the United States, C. passerinum is only found in two states, Alaska and Montana, and in locations that are threatened by oil and gas exploration. In Canada, it has been found in Wagner Natural Area outside of Edmonton, where efforts are ongoing to use microsatellites for its conservation.
