= Pollination trap =

Plant flower structures

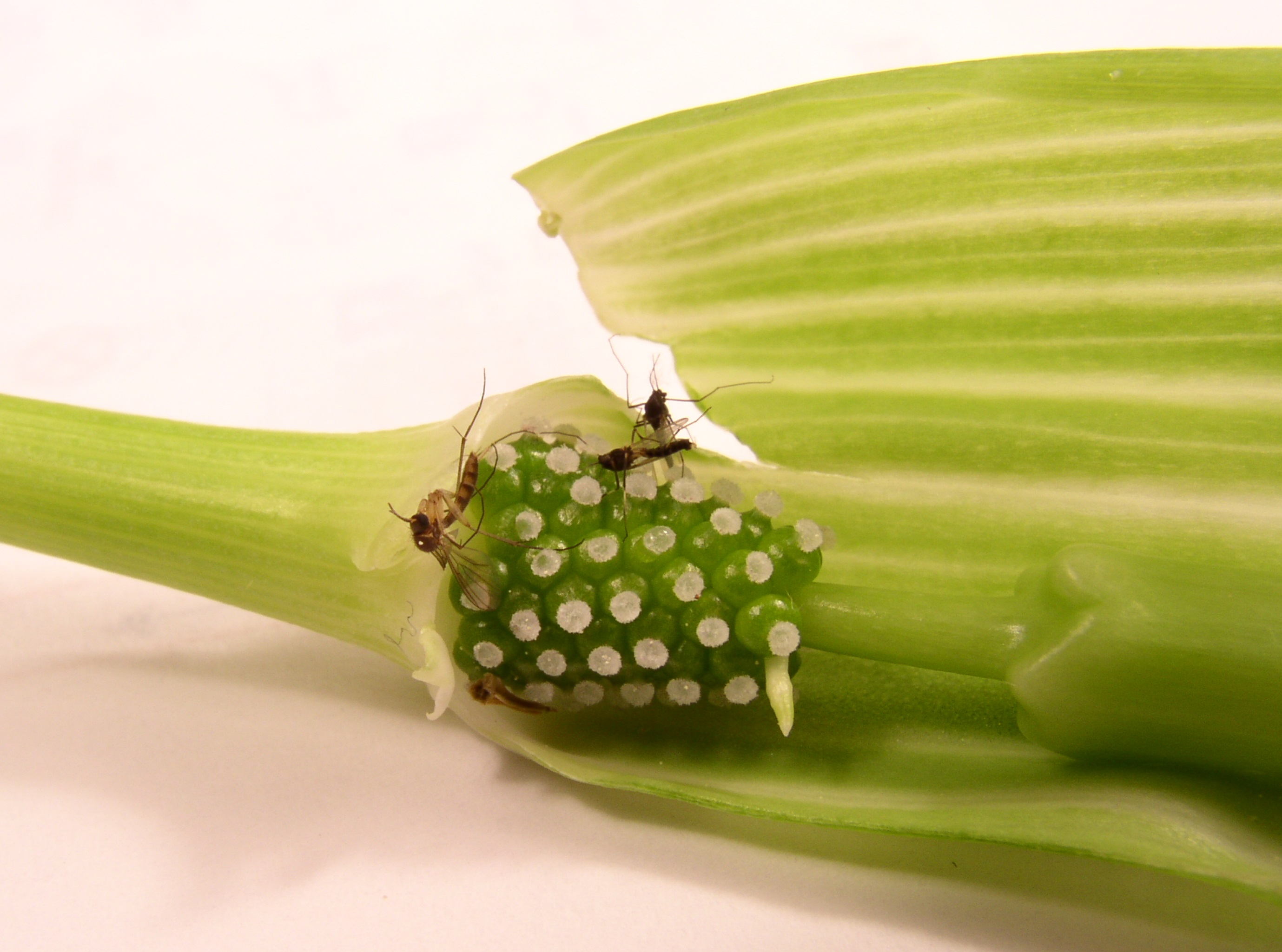
Jack-in the-pulpit (Arisaema triphyllum) female inflorescence with trapped insects, tribe Exechiini (3 mm) and subfamily Orthocladiinae (2 mm).

Pollination traps or trap-flowers are plant flower structures that aid the trapping of insects, mainly flies, so as to enhance their effectiveness in pollination. The structures of pollination traps can include deep tubular corollas with downward pointing hairs, slippery surfaces, adhesive liquid, attractants (often deceiving the insects by the use of sexual attractants rather than nectar reward and therefore termed as deceptive pollination), flower closing and other mechanisms.

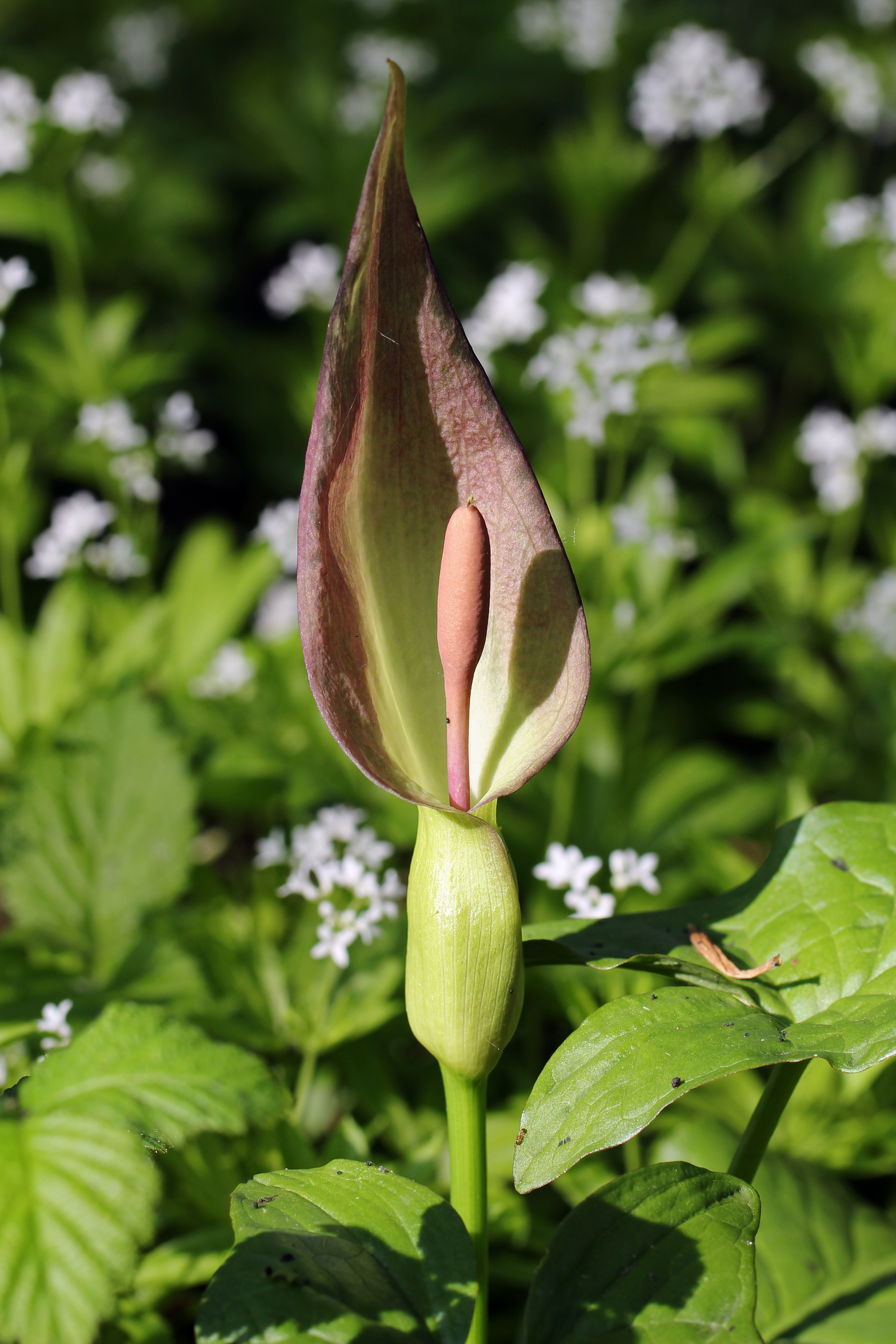
Arum with trap chamber at base

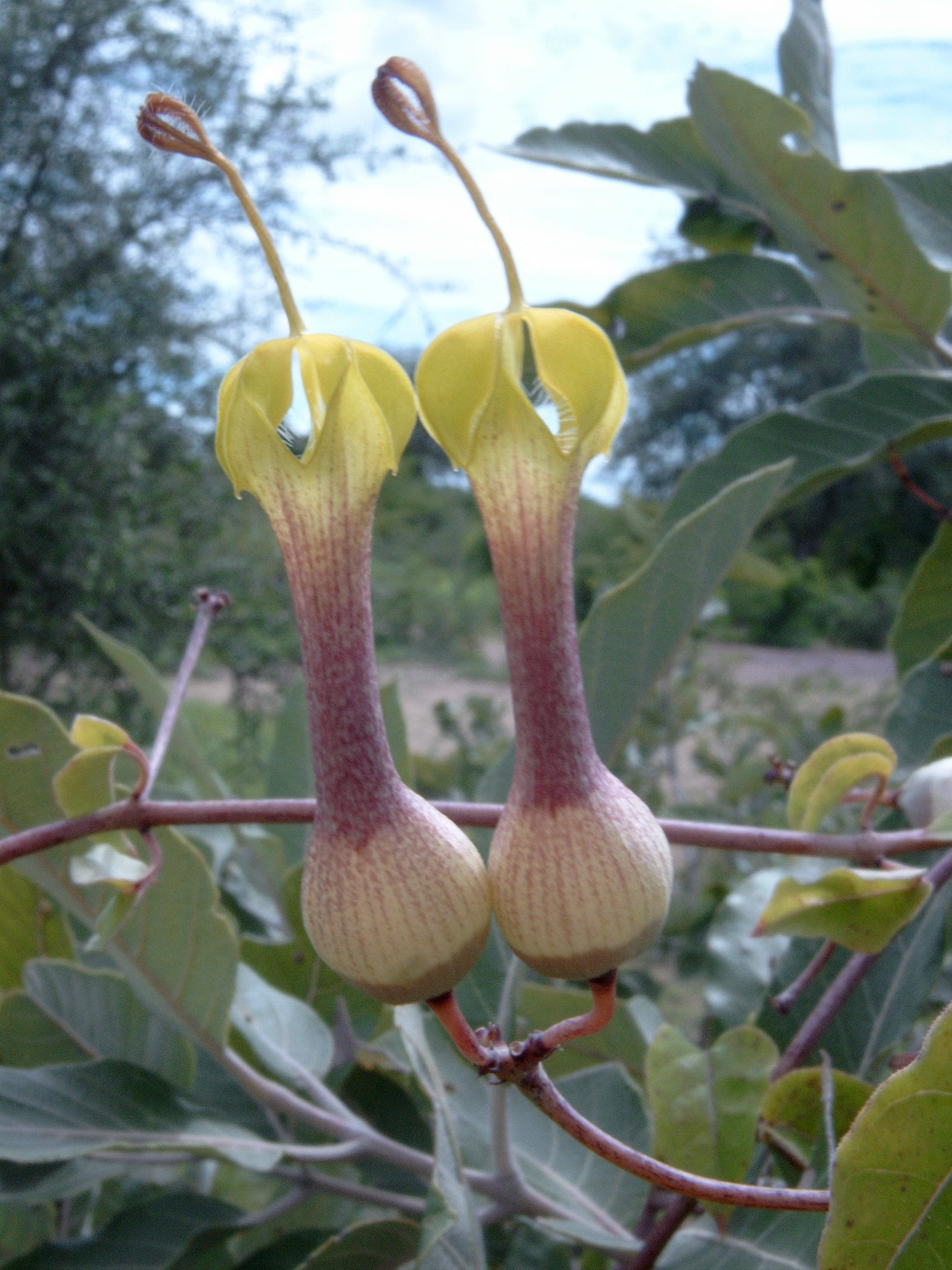
Ceropegia rhynchantha, another trap flower

In many species of orchids, the flowers produce chemicals that deceive male insects by producing attractants that mimic their females. The males are then led into structures that ensure the transfer of pollen to the surfaces of the insects. Orchids in the genus Pterostylis have been found to attract male fungus gnats with chemical attractants and then trap them using a mobile petal lip. The general observation of insects being trapped and aiding pollination were made as early as 1872 by Thomas Frederic Cheeseman and did not go unnoticed by Charles Darwin who examined the adaptations of orchids for pollination. Slipper orchids have smooth landing surfaces that allow insects to slide into a container from which a window of light leads the insect outwards through a narrow passage where the pollen transfer occurs. The structures found in large flowers such as those of Rafflesia and some Aristolochia are also evolved to attract and trap pollinators.

Trap-flowers that produce deceptive sexual chemicals to attract insects may often lack nectar rewards. Many fly-trapping flowers produce the smell of carrion.

== Pollination traps' interaction with pollinators ==
Pollination traps plants relies on pollinators such as flies, wasps, bees and more for their reproductive process. The interaction between both of the organism can be mutualistic relationship or commensalism relationship. Plants have evolved unique structures in order to attract and trap the insects that will be responsible to disperse their genetics to another plant. Nearly all trap flowers are protogynous.

=== Psychoda fly’s life cycle ===
There is a large number of different flies that the arum plant attracts to its trap. One of the main flies that successfully pollinate for the plant is Psychoda flies also known as the drain flies. These small flies have a short holometabolous life cycle that's completed within 21 to 27 days: egg, larval, pupal, and adult life. The eggs are deposited on wet or moist soils typically on the sides of drains or other surfaces and hatch in less than two days. Larvae are slender, white to creamy brown. Depending on the temperature this stage can vary from 9 to 15 days. Once they develop certain characteristics, they are ready to pupae. A yellow to brown pupa with small horns is formed and requires 24 to 48 hours before emerging. In the beginning of spring and peaking in late summer, drain flies are on the look out for food. They feed on decaying organic material which is what the arum plant utilizes.

=== Psychoda interaction with Arum plants ===
Flowers often have a sweet fragrance, but the flowers of the Arum plant, exude a rancid smell of ammonia and excrement. Based on its scent, the plant is able to attract drain flies, but what makes them irresistible is their purple rod. A combination of warmth and rancid smell that is emitted in the center of plant creates a perfect bait for the flies. As the flies are lured, they will tumble down the slippery walls into the lower chamber where they are trapped bristles above them. As the male flower opens up to release the flies it covers the flies with pollen and secretes sugary nectar in return. Now the fly will visit another plant of the same species and fertilize. This causes a mutualistic relationship as both will benefit from this trap.

=== Euglossine bee’s life cycle ===
There are around 200 different known orchid bee species. As many other pollinators, these bees collect nectar, pollen and resin from plants however, the Euglossine bees’ males also collect scents to create a right mixture of smells to attract females. They are also known as orchid bees and have four stages to complete, eggs are curved in shape that will hatch approximately 3 days. Larvae take up to 25 days to mature and pupate. The pupa stage lasts about 35 days after which adults emerge, living for 6 weeks to 3 months. Adult Euglossine bees look for mates, and their perfume-seeking behavior gives the Cypripedium orchid plant a resource to set up its trap.

=== Euglossine bee interaction with Orchid ===
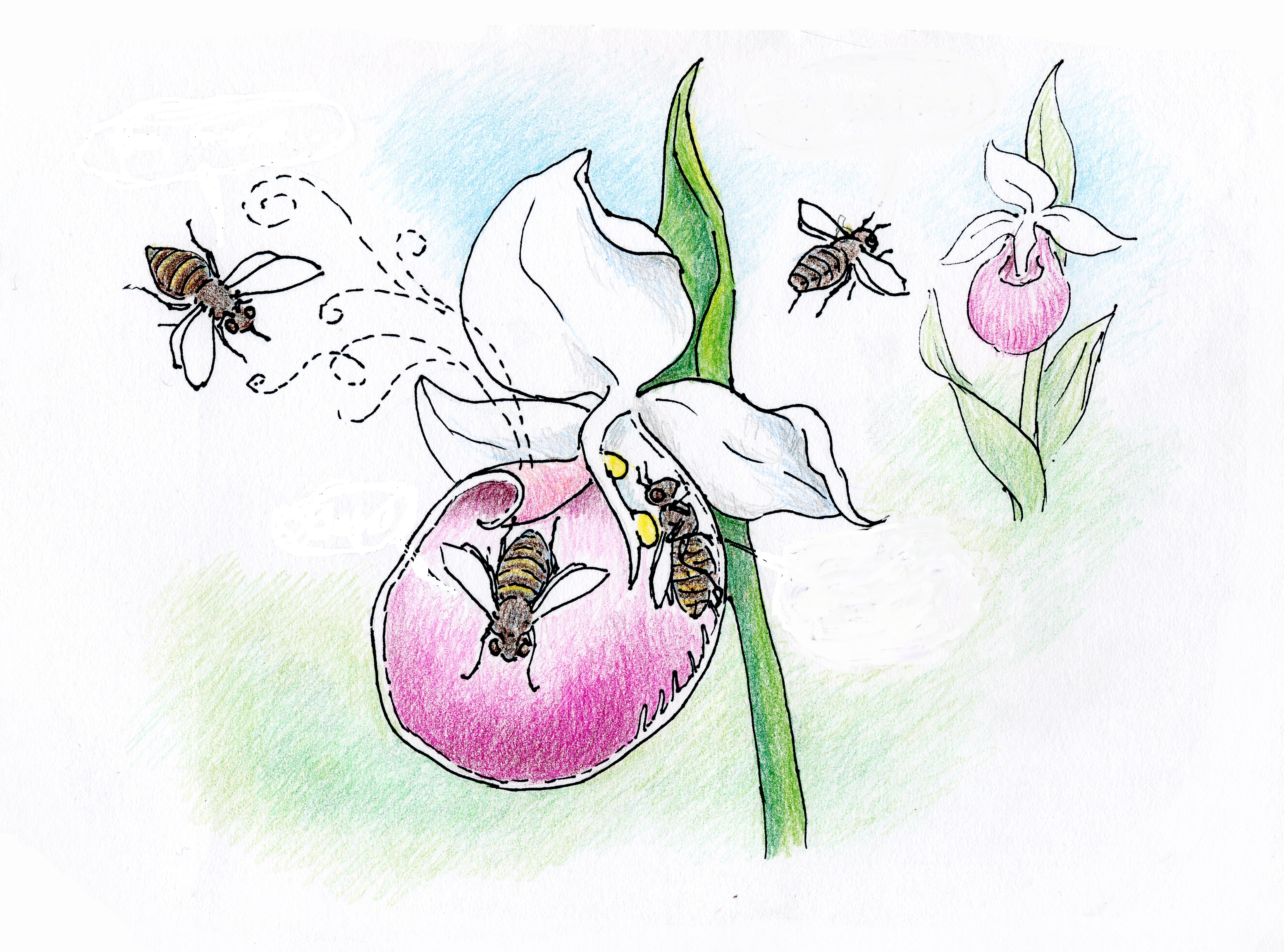
Cypripedium or lady slipper, trapping a bee so it goes through a narrow passage where it picks up the pollinia.

Orchids that attract Euglossine bees secrete scented oils, but while accessing these, the bees slip and into a water-filled bucket. To escape the bucket, the bee must crawl up a narrow tunnel, during which the plant attaches pollen sacs onto its back. The escaped bee will visit another orchid and drop the pollen, fertilising it. This is another mutualistic relationship as orchid bees will be covered in oils to find a mate and the pollen sacs will be delivered to another plant.

=== Others ===
Many members of the genus Arum trap pollinators and the specific mechanisms vary with the insects involved.

Species of the genus Cypripedium (lady slippers) of orchids trap insects temporarily to ensure pollination.

Plants in the genus Ceropegia attract pollinating small flies (usually female) in a wide range of families, including Milichiidae, Chloropidae, Drosophilidae, Calliphoridae, Ephydridae, Sciaridae, Tachinidae, Scatopsidae, Phoridae, and Ceratopogonidae, and the pollinaria always attach to their probosces. An analysis of the scents emitted by Ceropegia dolichophylla showed the presence of spiroacetals which are rare in plants and common among insects. Milichid flies, which are kleptoparasites of arthropod predators, are attracted by these chemicals and become the pollinators of these plants.
