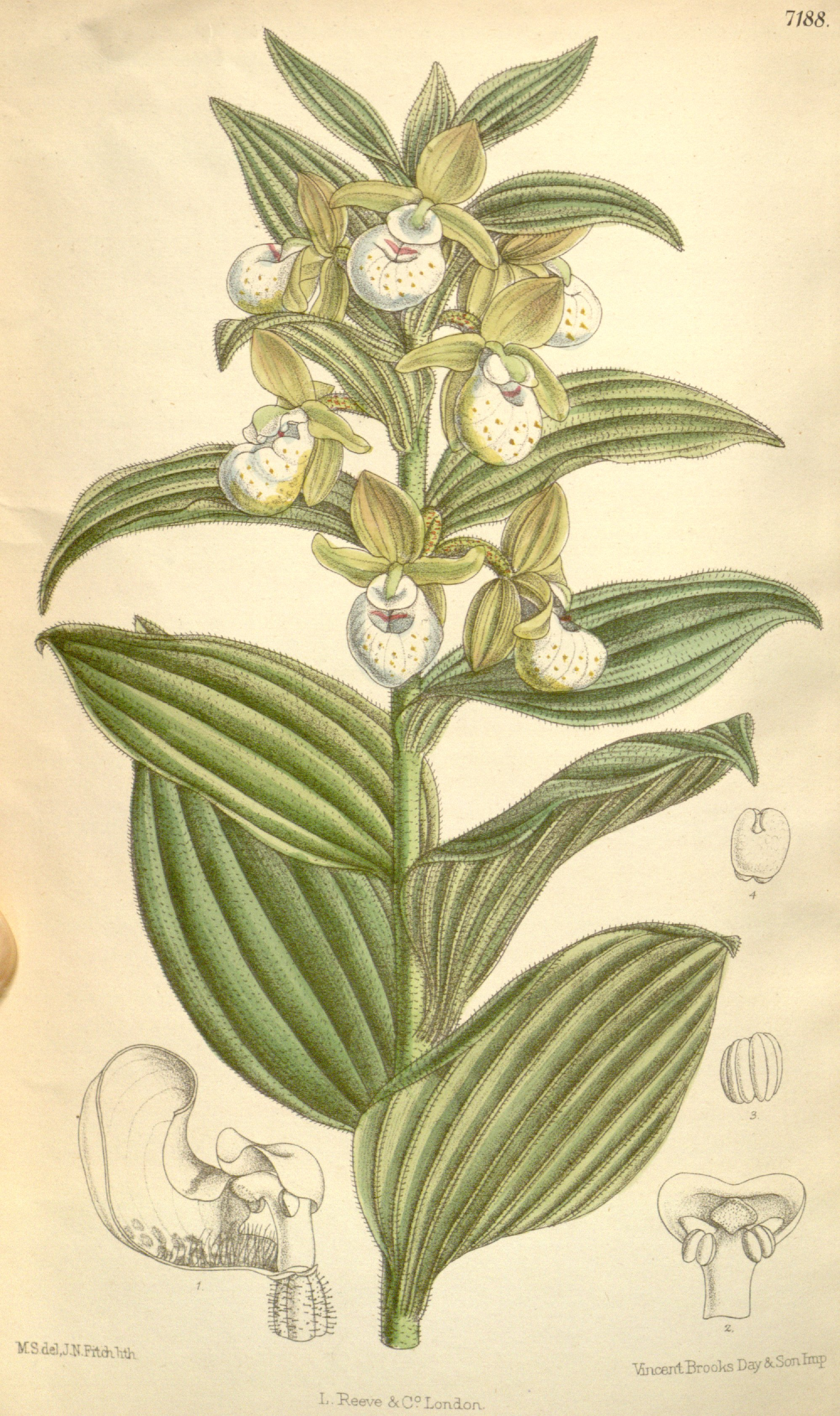
- 1891 illustration from Curtis's Botanical Magazine"

Conservation status
- Endangered (IUCN 3.1)

Scientific classification
- Kingdom: Plantae
- Clade: Embryophytes
- Clade: Tracheophytes
- Clade: Angiosperms
- Clade: Monocots
- Order: Asparagales
- Family: Orchidaceae
- Subfamily: Cypripedioideae
- Genus: Cypripedium
- Species: C. californicum

Binomial name
- Cypripedium californicum A.Gray (1868)

= Cypripedium californicum =

California lady's slipper

Species of orchid

Cypripedium californicum, the California lady's slipper, is a member of the orchid genus Cypripedium, the lady's slipper orchids, native to the western United States.

== Description ==
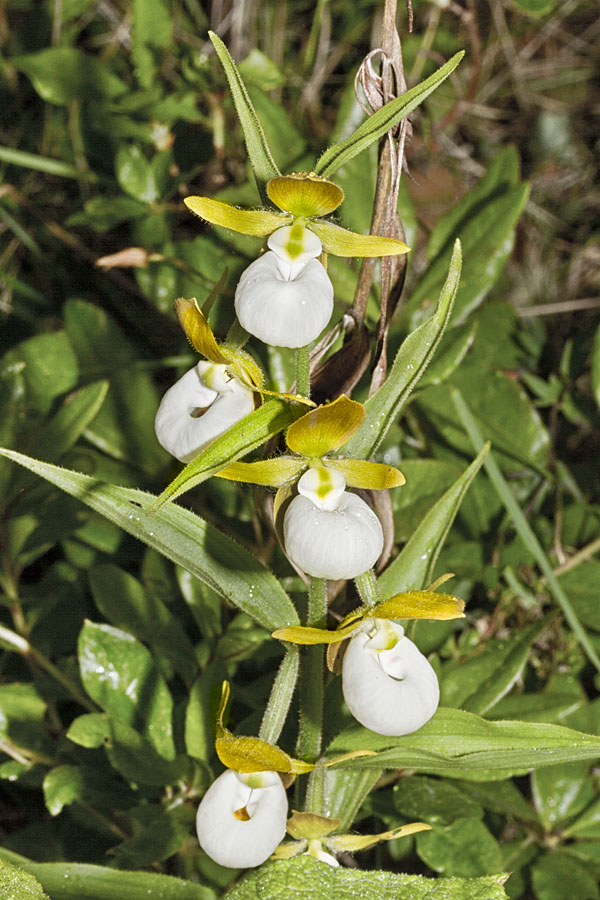
Blooming in Klamath Mountains, Del Norte County, California.

It often grows in very large clumps and each stem can bear up to 21 flowers. It can grow to be up to over a meter in height and has alternate, plicate leaves the length of the stem. The petals and sepals tend to be greenish-brown while the small pouch is pure white with occasional pink spots.

== Distribution and habitat ==
it has a very restricted range and can only be found in the mountains of southwestern Oregon (including the Kalmiopsis Wilderness) and northern California. It prefers the margins of woodland streams in open coniferous forests.
