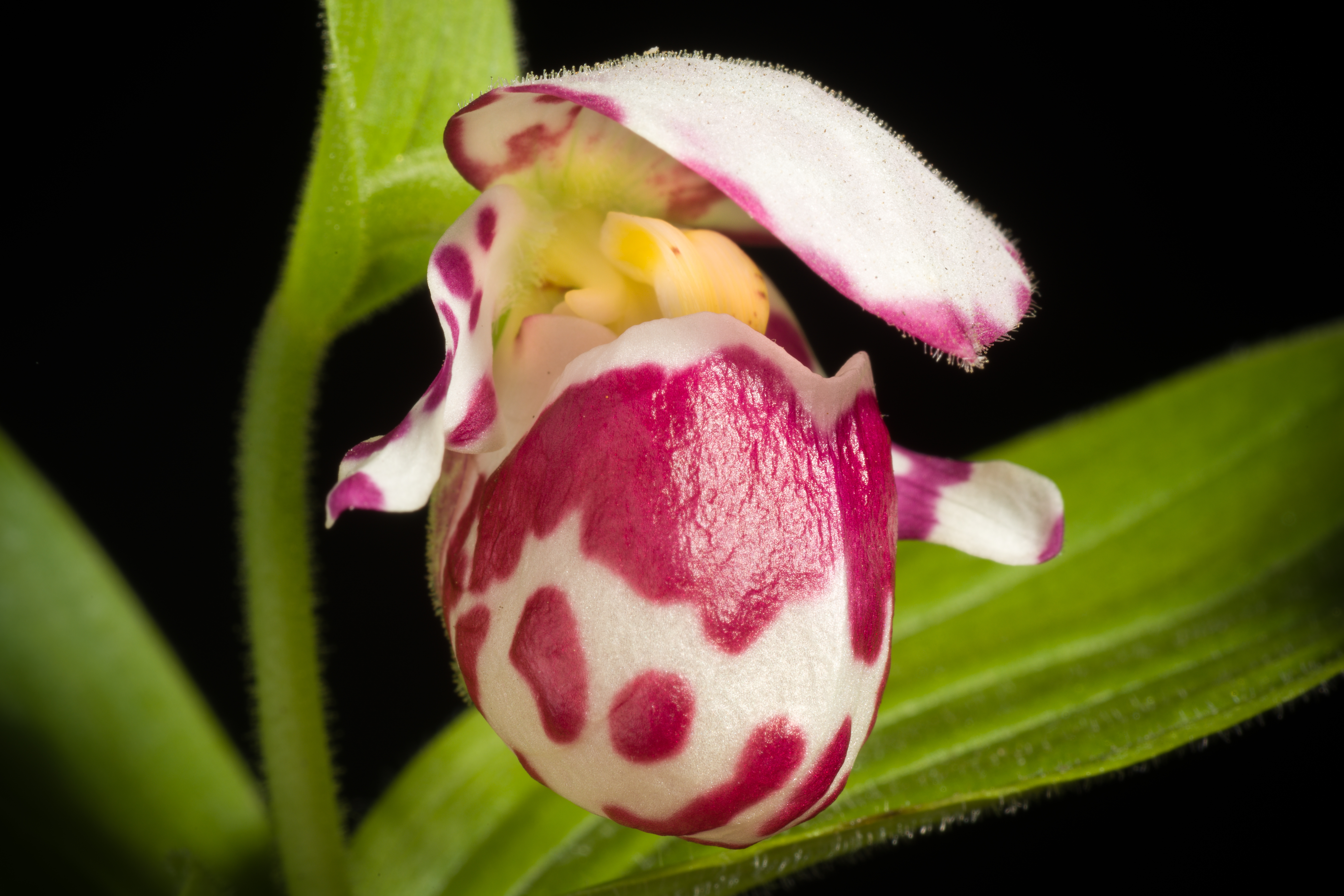

Conservation status
- Least Concern (IUCN 3.1)

- Secure (NatureServe)

Scientific classification
- Kingdom: Plantae
- Clade: Tracheophytes
- Clade: Angiosperms
- Clade: Monocots
- Order: Asparagales
- Family: Orchidaceae
- Subfamily: Cypripedioideae
- Genus: Cypripedium
- Species: C. guttatum

Binomial name
- Cypripedium guttatum Sw. (1800)

Synonyms
- Cypripedium orientale Spreng. (1826); Cypripedium variegatum Georgi (1775); Cypripedium guttatum var. redowskii Rchb.f. in H.G.L.Reichenbach 1851; Cypripedium guttatum f. latifolium Rouy ex E.G.Camus in E.G.Camus, P.Bergon & A.A.Camus 1908; Cypripedium guttatum var. koreanum Nakai (1952); Cypripedium guttatum f. redowskii (Rchb.f.) Soó 1969; Cypripedium guttatum f. albiflorum Aver. (1999); Cypripedium guttatum f. punicum Y.N.Lee 2005; Cypripedium bouffordianum Yong H.Zhang & H.Sun 2006; Cypripedium guttatum f. bouffordianum (Yong H.Zhang & H.Sun) J.M.H.Shaw 2012

= Cypripedium guttatum =

Species of orchid

Cypripedium guttatum, the spotted lady's slipper or Alaskan lady's slipper, is a species of orchid found on three continents. Each stem has about two clasping leaves that alternate. The plant has a height of 12 centimeters to 35 centimeters. The magenta and white colored labellum is pitcher shaped.

== Pollination ==
This species is pollinated by various species of bees in the genus Lasioglossum. It blooms from spring to early summer and mid summer.

== Distribution ==
It is native to Belarus, Russia (European Russia, Siberia and Russian Far East) as well as China (Hebei, Heilongjiang, Jilin, Liaoning, Nei Mongol, Ningxia, Shaanxi, Shandong, Shanxi, Sichuan, Tibet, and Yunnan), Korea, Mongolia, Bhutan, Alaska (including the Aleutians) and northern Canada (Yukon and Northwest Territories). It grows in forests, thickets, and grasslands.
