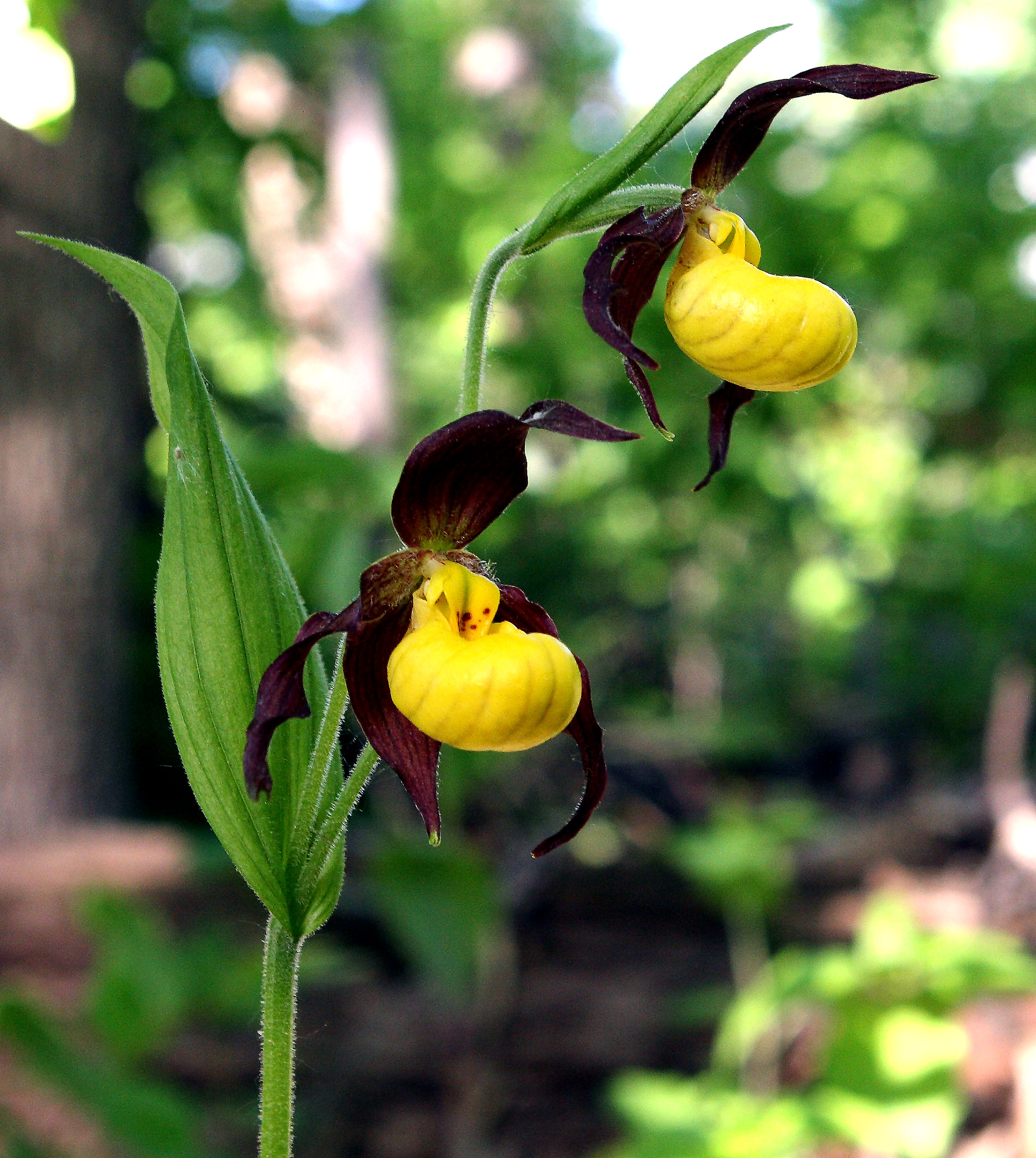
- Cypripedium parviflorum var. makasin Mackinac Island, Michigan

Conservation status
- Least Concern (IUCN 3.1)

- Secure (NatureServe)

Scientific classification
- Kingdom: Plantae
- Clade: Tracheophytes
- Clade: Angiosperms
- Clade: Monocots
- Order: Asparagales
- Family: Orchidaceae
- Subfamily: Cypripedioideae
- Genus: Cypripedium
- Species: C. parviflorum

Binomial name
- Cypripedium parviflorum Salisb.

Varieties
- C. p. var. exiliens; C. p. var. makasin; C. p. var. parviflorum; C. p. var. pubescens

Synonyms
- List: Calceolus parviflorus (Salisb.) Nieuwl.; Criosanthes parviflora (Salisb.) Raf.; Cypripedium bulbosum var. parviflorum (Salisb.) Farw.; Cypripedium calceolus subsp. parviflorum (Salisb.) Hultén; Cypripedium calceolus var. parviflorum (Salisb.) Fernald; Cypripedium hirsutum var. parviflorum (Salisb.) Rolfe; Cypripedium luteum var. parviflorum (Salisb.) Raf.

= Cypripedium parviflorum =

North American orchid species

Cypripedium parviflorum, commonly known as yellow lady's slipper or moccasin flower, is a lady's slipper orchid native to North America. It is widespread, ranging from Alaska south to Arizona and Georgia. It grows in fens, wetlands, shorelines, and damp woodlands.

== Description ==
- Plant: 16 to 60 cm tall, reported to 80 cm elsewhere: stem, bracts, and leaves pubescent; flower stem rises 10 cm above leaves; one flower, rarely two.
- Roots: few to many slender roots to 4 cm long on jointed rhizome.
- Leaves: ovate lanceolate, cauline, plicate, four to six on blooming plants, from 9 ⨉ 4 cm to 14 ⨉ 5 cm; covered with fine hairs on underside; a few hairs on topside.
- Floral bracts: ovate lanceolate bract at base of ovary, 7 ⨉ 2 cm.
- Flowers: bright yellow pouch with greenish to reddish sepals and petals; up to 10 cm high ⨉ 10 cm wide.
- Sepals: yellowish green with reddish stripes that turn to dots near pouch, fine hairs on back and edges; dorsal sepal ovate lanceolate, slightly concave, 4 ⨉ 2.2 cm; synsepal ellipitic, slightly concave; slight notch at tip, 3.2 ⨉ 1.4 cm.
- Petals: linear, acute, yellowish green with reddish stripes that turn to dots at pouch; 5.5 cm long ⨉ 0.7 cm wide; fine hairs on back along well-defined central ridge; few hairs on inner one-third toward pouch.
- Lip: bright yellow obovoid (pouch- or slipper-shaped), 3.2 cm wide ⨉ 4.0 cm high; opening 1.2 ⨉ 2.0 cm, with incurved margin; red dotted stripes on veins and faint reddish dots on inside and back of pouch.
- Column: light green with red dots at base, 1.5 cm high; two fertile anthers, one to either side; staminode yellow with red dots, arrowhead-shaped, with V form (folded); pollinia yellow sticky masses.
- Capsule: ellipsoidal, pubescent, 2.2 to 3 cm long ⨉ 0.6 to 1.3 cm in diameter

== Taxonomy ==
Cypripedium parviflorum was given its scientific name in 1791 by Richard Anthony Salisbury. It is classified as part of the genus Cypripedium as part of the family Orchidaceae. C. parviflorum is a highly variable species, which is a result of both hybridization and phenotypic plasticity.

Four varieties are widely recognized. They are:

- C. parviflorum var. exiliens Sheviak – Alaska
- C. parviflorum var. makasin (Farwell) Sheviak – commonly called the "northern yellow lady's-slipper"; widely distributed over much of Canada and the northern United States
- C. parviflorum var. parviflorum – commonly called the "small yellow lady's-slipper"; southern part of the species range, from eastern Nebraska and eastern Oklahoma east to Virginia and New Hampshire
- C. parviflorum var. pubescens (Willdenow) O. W. Knight – commonly called the "large yellow lady's-slipper"; very widespread across much of United States, Canada, and Saint Pierre and Miquelon; treated by many authors as a distinct species, Cypripedium pubescens
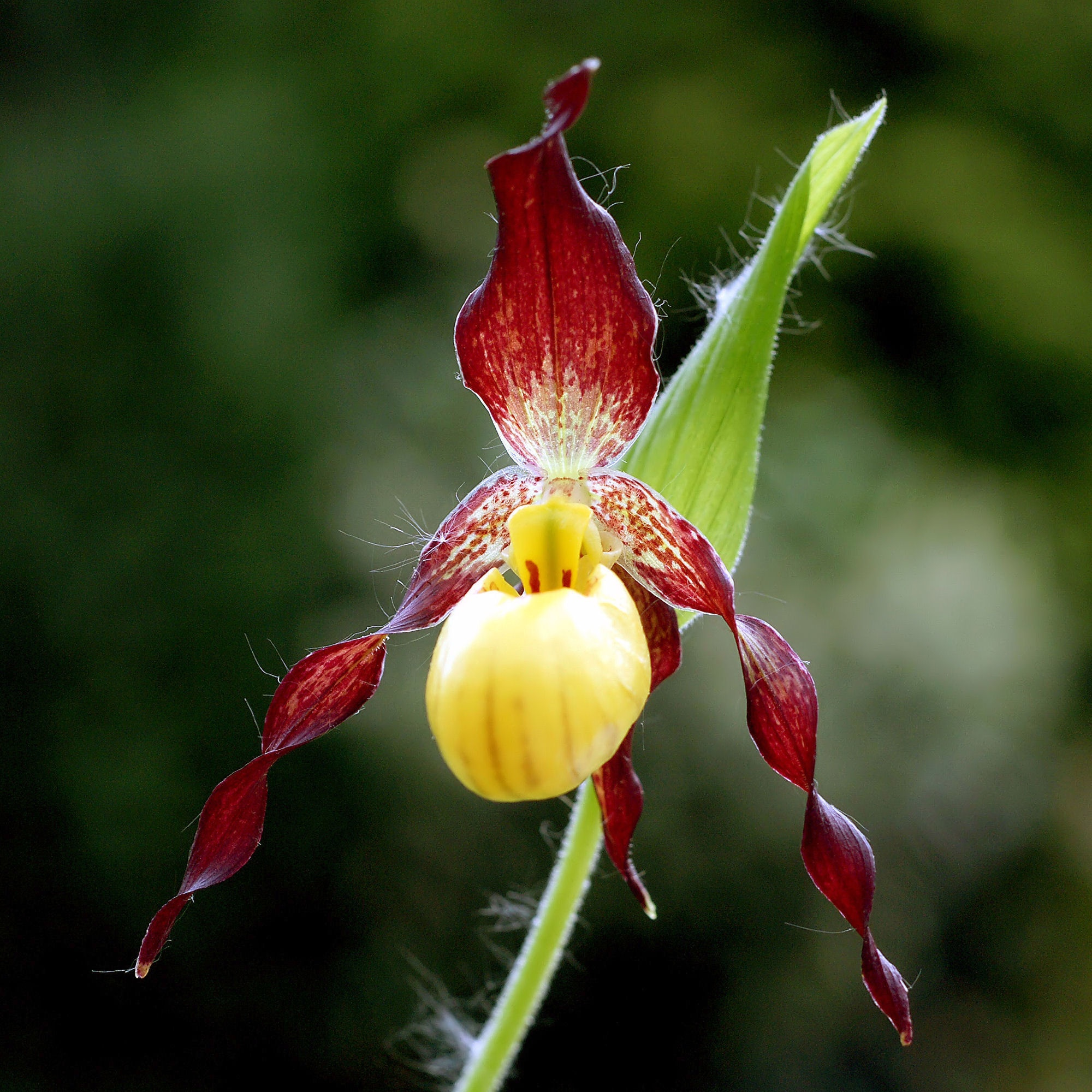
C. parviflorum var. parviflorum, showing pubescent bract and dark maroon sepals

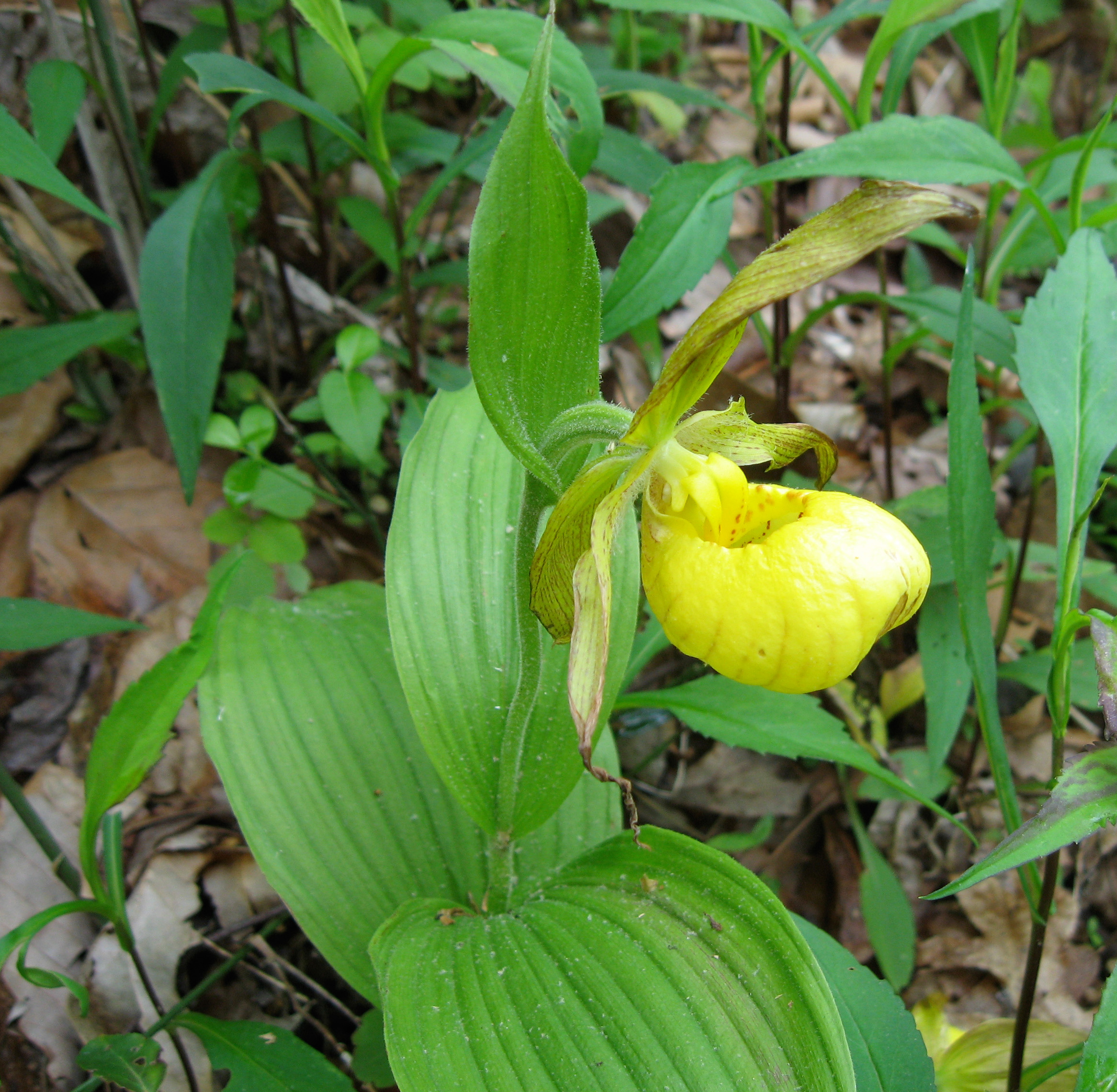
C. parviflorum var. pubescens, showing yellow-green sepals spotted with maroon

Cypripedium parviflorum has 36 synonyms of the species or three of its four varieties.

Table of Synonyms
Name	Year	Rank	Synonym of:	Notes
Calceolus parviflorus (Salisb.) Nieuwl.	1913	species	C. parviflorum	≡ hom.
Criosanthes parviflora (Salisb.) Raf.	1838	species	C. parviflorum	≡ hom.
Cypripedium assurgens Raf.	1833	species	var. pubescens	= het.
Cypripedium aureum Raf.	1833	species	var. pubescens	= het.
Cypripedium bifidum Raf.	1833	species	var. parviflorum	= het.
Cypripedium bulbosum var. flavescens (Redouté) Farw.	1913	variety	var. pubescens	= het.
Cypripedium bulbosum var. parviflorum (Salisb.) Farw.	1913	variety	C. parviflorum	≡ hom.
Cypripedium bulbosum var. pubescens (Willd.) Farw.	1927	variety	var. pubescens	≡ hom.
Cypripedium calceolus subsp. parviflorum (Salisb.) Hultén	1967	subspecies	C. parviflorum	≡ hom.
Cypripedium calceolus var. parviflorum (Salisb.) Fernald	1946	variety	C. parviflorum	≡ hom.
Cypripedium calceolus var. planipetalum (Fernald) Vict. & J.Rousseau	1940	variety	var. pubescens	= het.
Cypripedium calceolus var. pubescens (Willd.) Correll	1938	variety	var. pubescens	≡ hom.
Cypripedium calceolus f. rupestre Vict. & J.Rousseau	1940	form	var. pubescens	= het.
Cypripedium flavescens Redouté	1803	species	var. pubescens	= het.
Cypripedium furcatum Raf.	1833	species	var. pubescens	= het.
Cypripedium hirsutum var. parviflorum (Salisb.) Rolfe	1907	variety	C. parviflorum	≡ hom.
Cypripedium luteum Aiton ex Raf.	1828	species	var. parviflorum	= het.
Cypripedium luteum var. angustifolium Raf.	1828	variety	var. pubescens	= het.
Cypripedium luteum var. biflorum Raf.	1828	variety	var. pubescens	= het.
Cypripedium luteum var. concolor Raf.	1828	variety	var. pubescens	= het.
Cypripedium luteum var. glabrum Raf.	1828	variety	var. pubescens	= het.
Cypripedium luteum var. grandiflorum Raf.	1828	variety	var. pubescens	= het.
Cypripedium luteum var. maculatum Raf.	1828	variety	var. pubescens	= het.
Cypripedium luteum var. parviflorum (Salisb.) Raf.	1828	variety	C. parviflorum	≡ hom.
Cypripedium luteum var. pubescens (Willd.) Raf.	1828	variety	var. pubescens	≡ hom.
Cypripedium makasin Farw.	1918	species	var. makasin	= het.
Cypripedium parviflorum f. albolabium Magrath & J.L.Norman	1989	form	var. parviflorum	= het.
Cypripedium parviflorum var. planipetalum Fernald	1926	variety	var. pubescens	= het.
Cypripedium parviflorum f. planipetalum (Fernald) P.J.Cribb	2012	form	var. pubescens	= het.
Cypripedium planipetalum (Fernald) F.J.A.Morris	1929	species	var. pubescens	= het.
Cypripedium pubescens Willd.	1804	species	var. pubescens	≡ hom.
Cypripedium pubescens var. makasin Farw.	1918	variety	var. makasin	≡ hom.
Cypripedium undatum Raf.	1833	species	var. pubescens	= het.
Cypripedium veganum Cockerell & Barker	1900	species	var. pubescens	= het.
Cypripedium vittatum Raf.	1833	species	var. pubescens	= het., nom. illeg.
Cypripedium vittatum var. tortile Raf.	1833	variety	var. pubescens	= het.
Notes: ≡ homotypic synonym; = heterotypic synonym

== Distribution and habitat ==
=== Distribution ===
- Newfoundland to British-Columbia, south to Georgia, Arizona, and Washington; Europe.
- Newfoundland to Alaska and south to Oregon in the West.
- In the East along the Atlantic Coast, it is in every state except Florida and extends across to Louisiana and eastern Texas.
- New Mexico state: Catron, Colfax, Grant, Los Alamos, Otero, San Miguel, San Juan and Santa Fe Counties.
- Arizona state: Apache, Graham, and Greenlee Counties.

=== Habitat ===
C. parviflorum is a more upland plant preferring subacidic to neutral soils. It is found primarily in mesic to dry-mesic upland forests, woodlands with deep humus or layers of leaf litter and shaded boggy habitats, but also in hill prairies and occasionally in wetlands with organic, well-drained, sandy soils. Specifically, in fir, pine, and aspen forest between 6,000 and 9,500 feet (1,830 and 2,900 m), it prefers moderate shade to nearly full sun. It may be present in mountain meadows and on timbered slopes, as well as dripping seeps on steep to moderately sloped canyon walls.
