= Twin Lakes Bog State Natural Area =

State Natural Area in Wisconsin

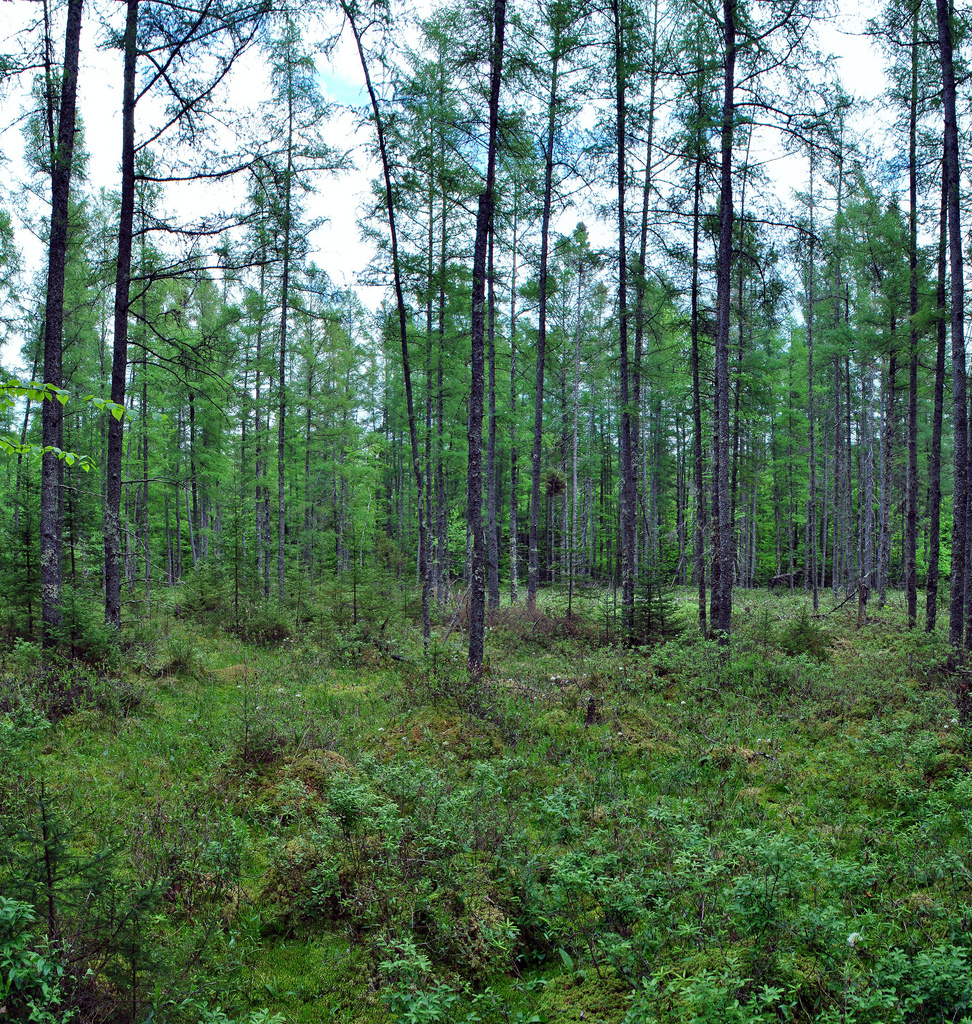
- Twin Lakes Bog

- Location within Wisconsin Location within the United States
- Location: Taylor County, Wisconsin
- Coordinates: 45°16′23″N 90°26′14″W
- Area: 38 acres (15 ha)
- Elevation: 614 ft (187 m)
- Established: 1996
- Owner: U.S. Forest Service
- Website: Official website

Twin Lakes Bog State Natural Area is a Wisconsin Department of Natural Resources-designated State Natural Area featuring an intact tamarack (Larix laricina) swamp lying in a depression between two kettle lakes (North Twin Lake and South Twin Lake). The understory of the swamp has an open aspect to it, and is dominated by the ericaceous shrubs Labrador tea (Rhododendron groenlandicum), bog laurel (Kalmia polifolia), and leatherleaf (Chamaedaphne calyculata). Other common plant species found here include: wooly-fruit Sedge (Carex lasiocarpa), twinflower (Linnaea borealis), cinnamon fern (Osmundastrum cinnamomeum), sundews (Drosera rotundifolia) and (Drosera intermedia), and the notably abundant pink ladyslipper (Cypripedium acaule). Three small bog lakes (0.4-1.0 acres), surrounded by quaking bog mats, are found in the interior of the swamp. Uplands surrounding the swamp are forested with second-growth hardwoods dominated by sugar maple (Acer saccharum) and red oak (Quercus rubra). In 1989, the US Forest Service designated Twin Lakes Bog as a Research Natural Area.

== Location and access ==
Twin Lakes Bog State Natural Area is located within the Chequamegon National Forest, in north-central Taylor County, approximately 10.75 miles (17.30 km) northwest of Medford. Access is via Forest Road 1504, which runs along the western edge of the area.

== Gallery ==
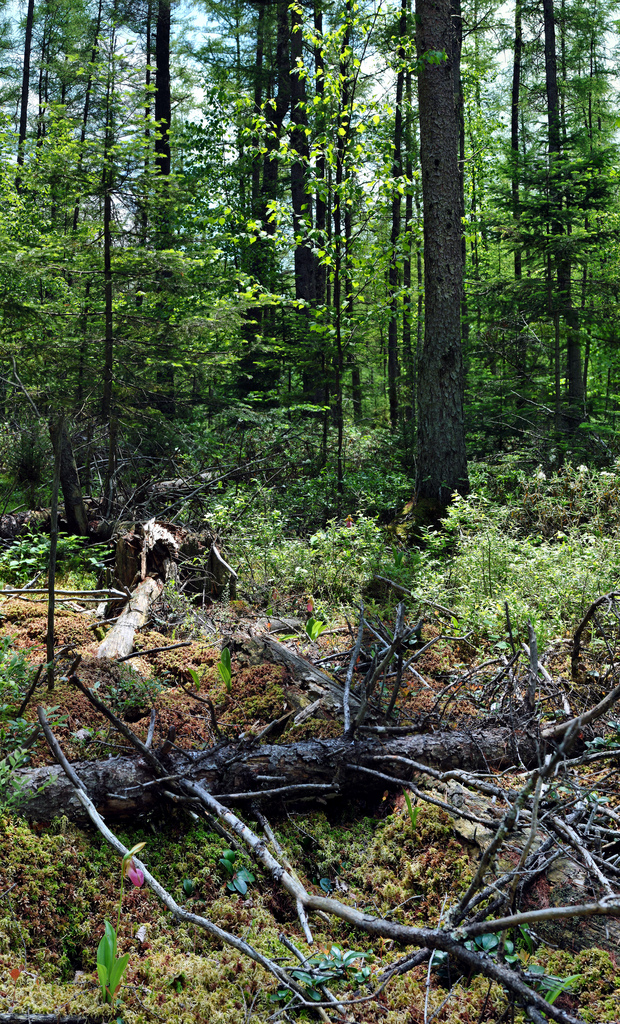
Twin Lakes Bog

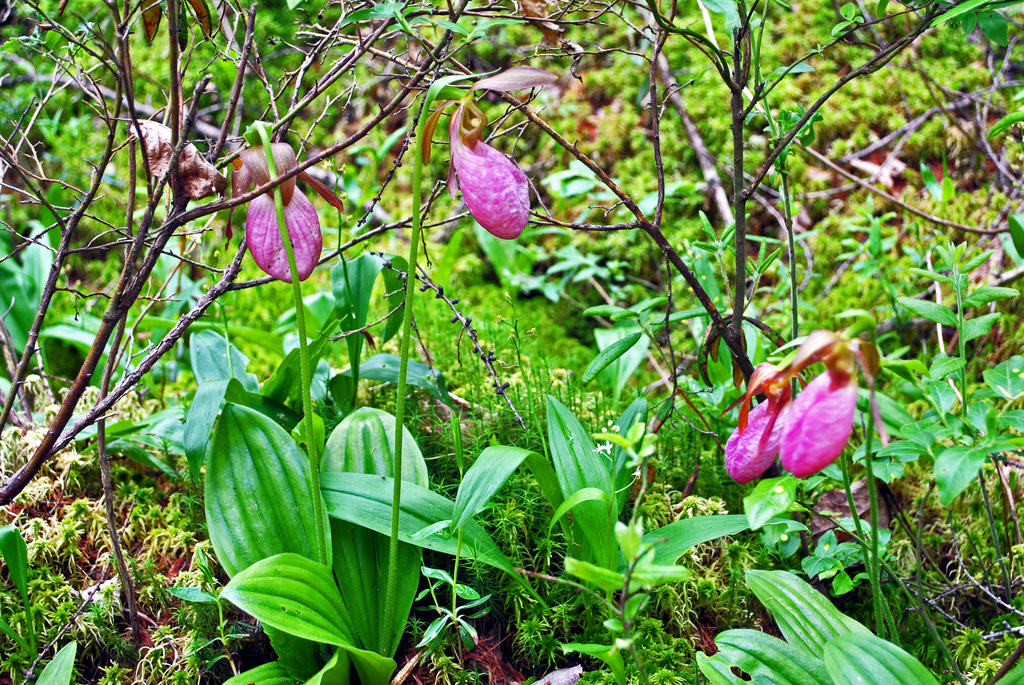
Pink ladyslippers (Cypripedium acaule) are abundant in Twin Lakes Bog

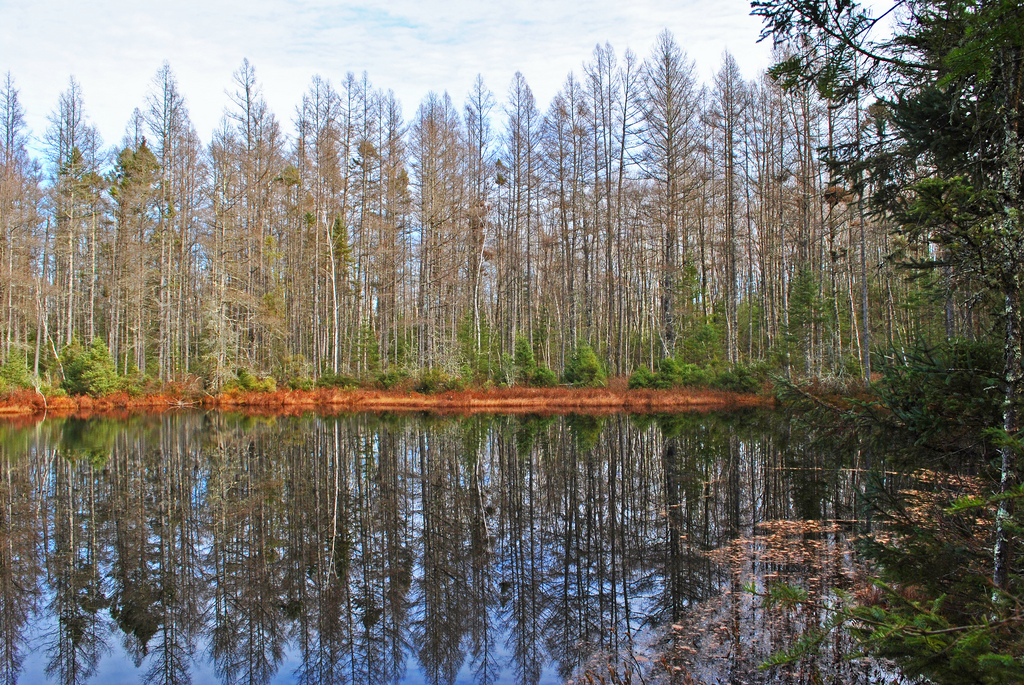
One of the small bog lakes within Twin Lakes Bog
