= Selenipedium dodsonii =

Conservation status
- Endangered (IUCN 3.1)

Scientific classification
- Kingdom: Plantae
- Clade: Tracheophytes
- Clade: Angiosperms
- Clade: Monocots
- Order: Asparagales
- Family: Orchidaceae
- Subfamily: Cypripedioideae
- Genus: Selenipedium
- Species: S. dodsonii

Binomial name
- Selenipedium dodsonii P.J.Cribb

Synonyms
- Selenipedium garayanum Szlach. & Kolan.

Species of flowering plant

Selenipedium dodsonii is a species of flowering plant in the orchid family native to Ecuador, where it grows near rivers in rainforest. It was first described in 2015, and is named after Calaway Dodson. Selenipedium dodsonii is an endangered species, and is listed in Annex II to the Convention on International Trade in Endangered Species of Wild Fauna and Flora (CITES). Plants grow up to 3 m (9.8 ft) tall, and between April and November produce small flowers.

== Description ==
S. dosonii is a terrestrial herb with erect, terete, leafy stems up to 3 metres (9.8 ft) tall, and often sparsely branching above. The stems are covered by coarse and dense villose leaf-bases, and are dark green in colour. Its dark green leaves are 17–20 centimetres (6.7–7.9 in) in length and 2.8–3.8 centimetres (1.1–1.5 in) wide, and narrowly elliptic-lanceolate. Its inflorescence measuring up to 15 centimetres (5.9 in) can be terminal or grows from axils of upper branches, and has few but dense flowers. Its small flowers are produced in succession with its sepals and petals being light dull yellow in colour, but its fruit are not seen so far in Cribb's original description in 2015.

The morphologically closest species is S. aequinoctiale, with its key difference is its dorsal sepals being fully yellow, rather than the other which has purplish flecks. The staminode of S. dodsonii is a third the width of the lip base, while the S. aequinoctiale equivalent is about a quarter of its lip base's width.

== Distribution ==
S. dodsonii is endemic to northern Ecuador, specifically to the Amazonian side of the Andes, where it mainly grows near rivers.
