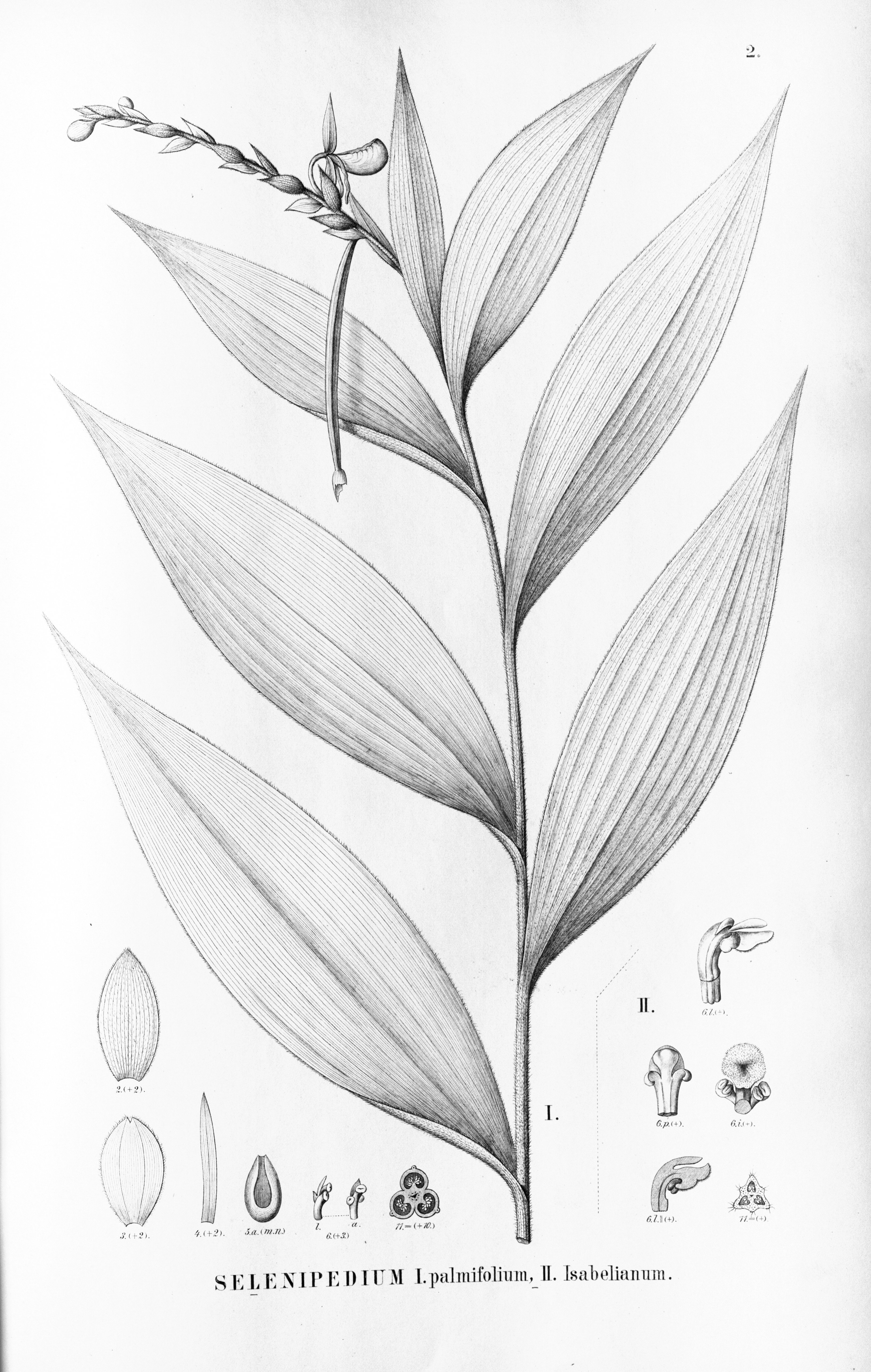
- Selenipedium palmifolium, illustration

Scientific classification
- Kingdom: Plantae
- Clade: Tracheophytes
- Clade: Angiosperms
- Clade: Monocots
- Order: Asparagales
- Family: Orchidaceae
- Subfamily: Cypripedioideae
- Genus: Selenipedium; Rchb.f.

Species
- See text

= Selenipedium =

Genus of orchids

Selenipedium is a genus of the orchid family (Orchidaceae) (Subfamily Cypripedioideae). The genus has been given its own tribe, Selenipedieae, and subtribe, Selenipediinae. It is abbreviated Sel in trade journals.

The name of the genus is derived from the Greek selen, which means "moon", and pedium, which means "slipper" (referring to the pouch).

The seed capsules of these Central and South American lady's slipper orchids were formerly used as vanilla substitutes, but selenipediums are now rarely cultivated. Partly this is because of the difficulty of doing so, but is probably also due to the relatively small size of the Selenipedium's flower. The wild flower's Amazonian habitat is also under threat, so extinction is a risk for all species of Selenipedium.

Accepted species include:

- Selenipedium aequinoctiale Garay — Ecuador
- Selenipedium buenaventurae (Szlach. & Kolan.) P.J.Cribb
- Selenipedium chica Rchb.f.
- Selenipedium dodsonii P.J.Cribb
- Selenipedium isabelianum Barb.Rodr. — Brazil
- Selenipedium olgae Szlach. & Kolan.
- Selenipedium palmifolium (Lindl.) Rchb.f. & Warsz.
- Selenipedium steyermarkii Foldats — Brazil, Venezuela
- Selenipedium vanillocarpum Barb.Rodr. — Brazil

Allied genera include Paphiopedilum, Mexipedium, Cypripedium and Phragmipedium - a genus containing several species formerly known as Selenipedium, such as Selenipedium caricinum (now Phragmipedium caricinum), and Selenipedium laevigatum (now Paphiopedilum philippinense).
