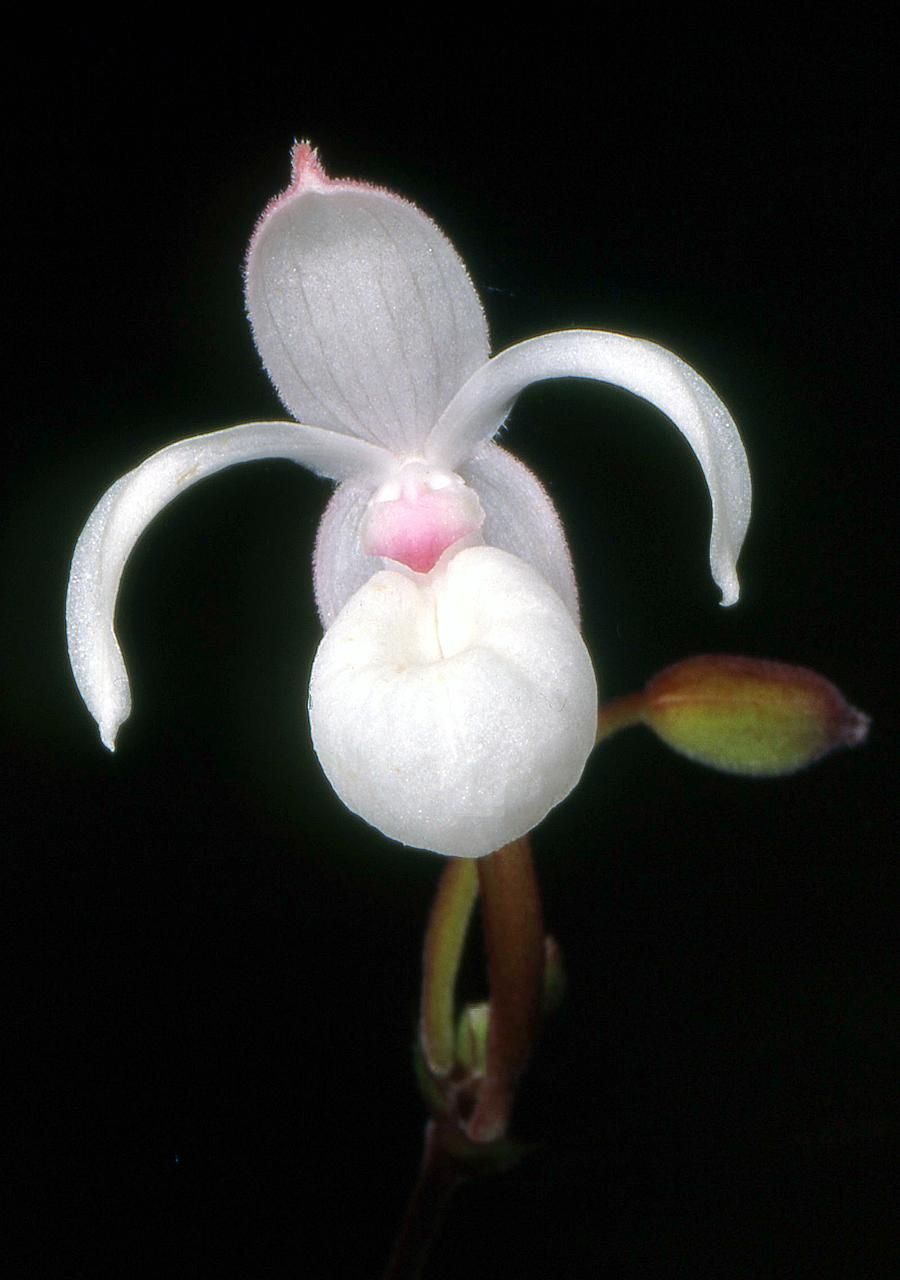

Conservation status
- Critically Endangered (IUCN 3.1)
- CITES Appendix I (CITES)

Scientific classification
- Kingdom: Plantae
- Clade: Tracheophytes
- Clade: Angiosperms
- Clade: Monocots
- Order: Asparagales
- Family: Orchidaceae
- Subfamily: Cypripedioideae
- Genus: Mexipedium; V.A.Albert & M.W.Chase
- Species: M. xerophyticum

Binomial name
- Mexipedium xerophyticum (Soto Arenas, Salazar & Hágsater) V.A.Albert & M.W.Chase
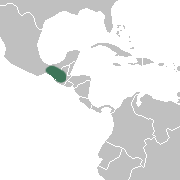

Synonyms
- Phragmipedium xerophyticum Soto Arenas, Salazar & Hágsater; Paphiopedilum xerophyticum (Soto Arenas, Salazar & Hágsater) V.A.Albert & Börge Pett.

= Mexipedium =

Genus of flowering plants

Mexipedium is a monotypic genus of the orchid family Orchidaceae, subfamily Cypripedioideae, consisting of only one species, Mexipedium xerophyticum. It is also the sole genus of tribe Mexipedieae and subtribe Mexipediinae.

== Taxonomy and discovery ==
This species was initially described as Phragmipedium xerophyticum by Soto Arenas, Salazar & Hágsater in 1990, but transferred to its own genus by Albert & Chase in 1992, in part based on results from DNA analysis. The genus Mexipedium is listed as Phragmipedium in Appendix I of the Convention on International Trade in Endangered Species (CITES), and for other legal purposes. Allied genera include Cypripedium, Paphiopedilum, Selenipedium and Phragmipedium.

Its name is derived from the country of origin Mexico and the Latin pes ("foot"), referring to the slipper-shaped lip. The specific epithet xerophyticum is from the Greek ξηρός (xērós, "dry") and φυτόν (phutón, "plant"), referring to its preference for dry conditions.

Mexipedium xerophyticum is known from a single location in Oaxaca, Mexico. Only seven plants were observed at the time of its discovery. Mexipedium was recently rediscovered in a nearby locality. A small number of plants were removed for propagation in case plant hunters eradicated the wild stock. Plants are now available as propagules.

== Description and habitat ==
This is a lithophytic orchid, growing on cliffs, shielded from the sun, at an elevation of 320 m (1,050 ft). But it grows as well on rocks or in the detritus in crevasses. Its growth form is unusual in that it tends to spread by runners, offset from the parent plant by several centimeters. The silvery-green leaves are small, stiff and semi-erect. The tiny white-pink flowers show a shieldlike, pinkish staminode and a slipper-shaped lip. The curved petals are scythe-shaped. Inflorescences are multifloral and branched.

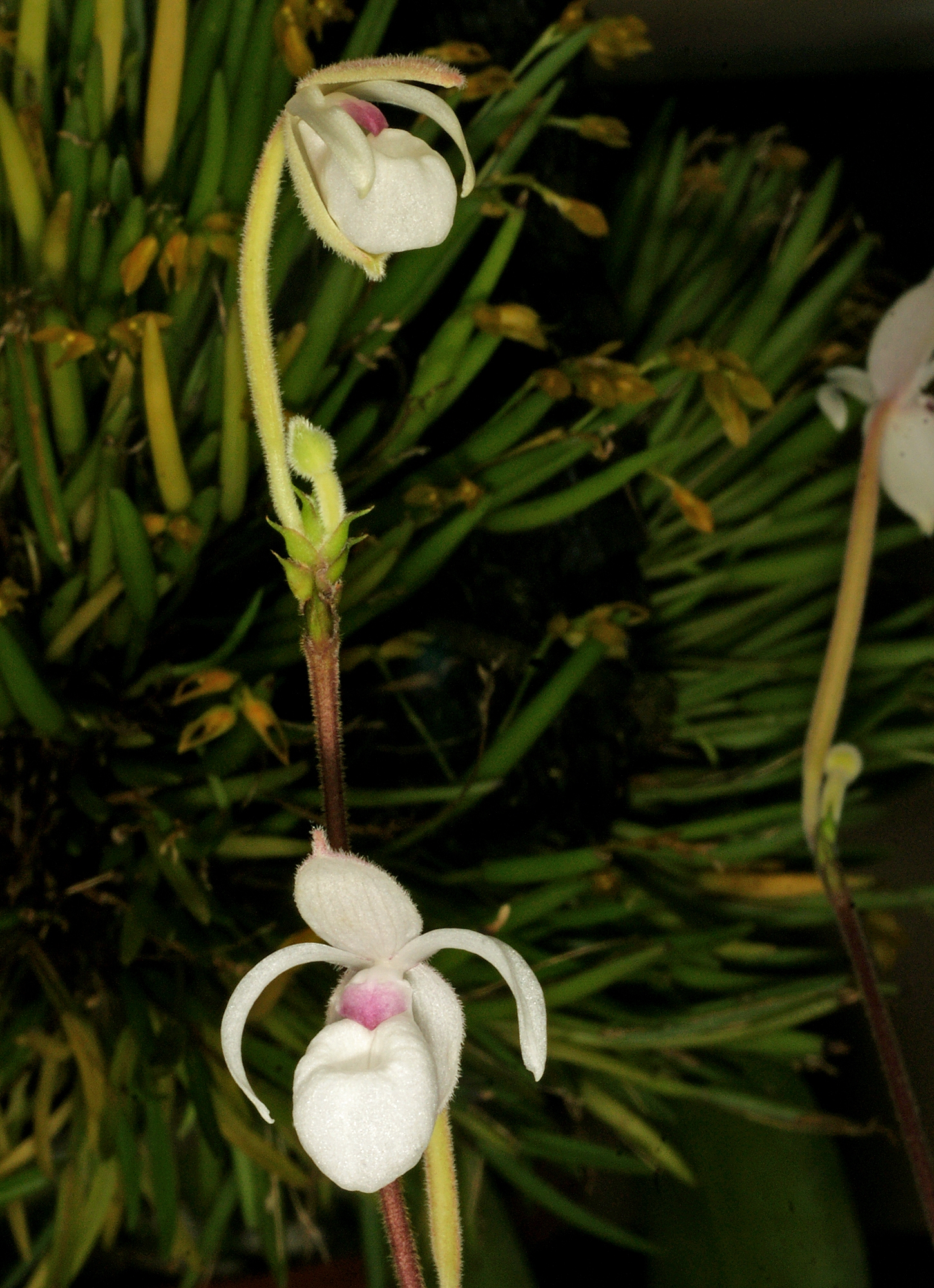
Plant

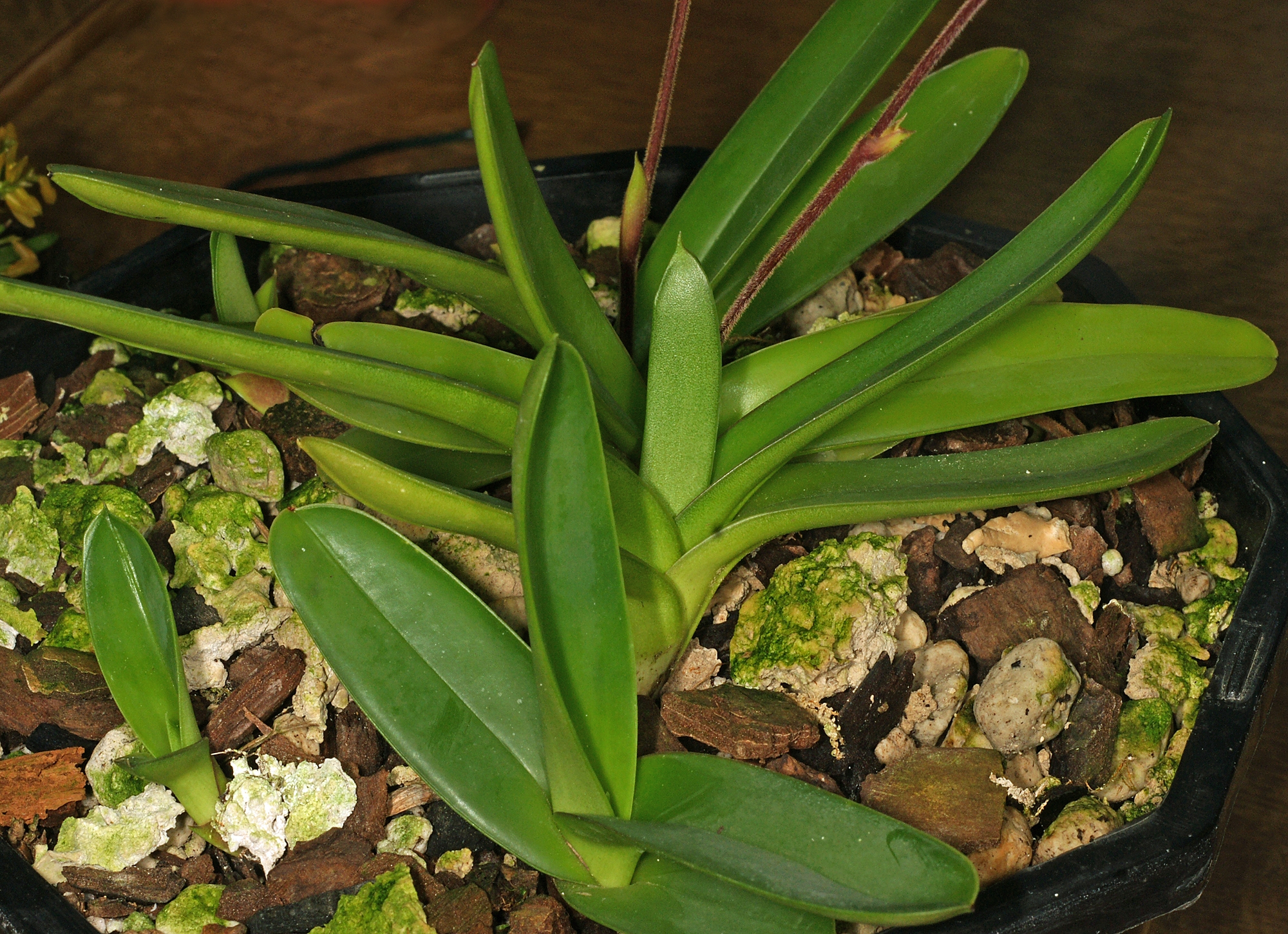
Leaves

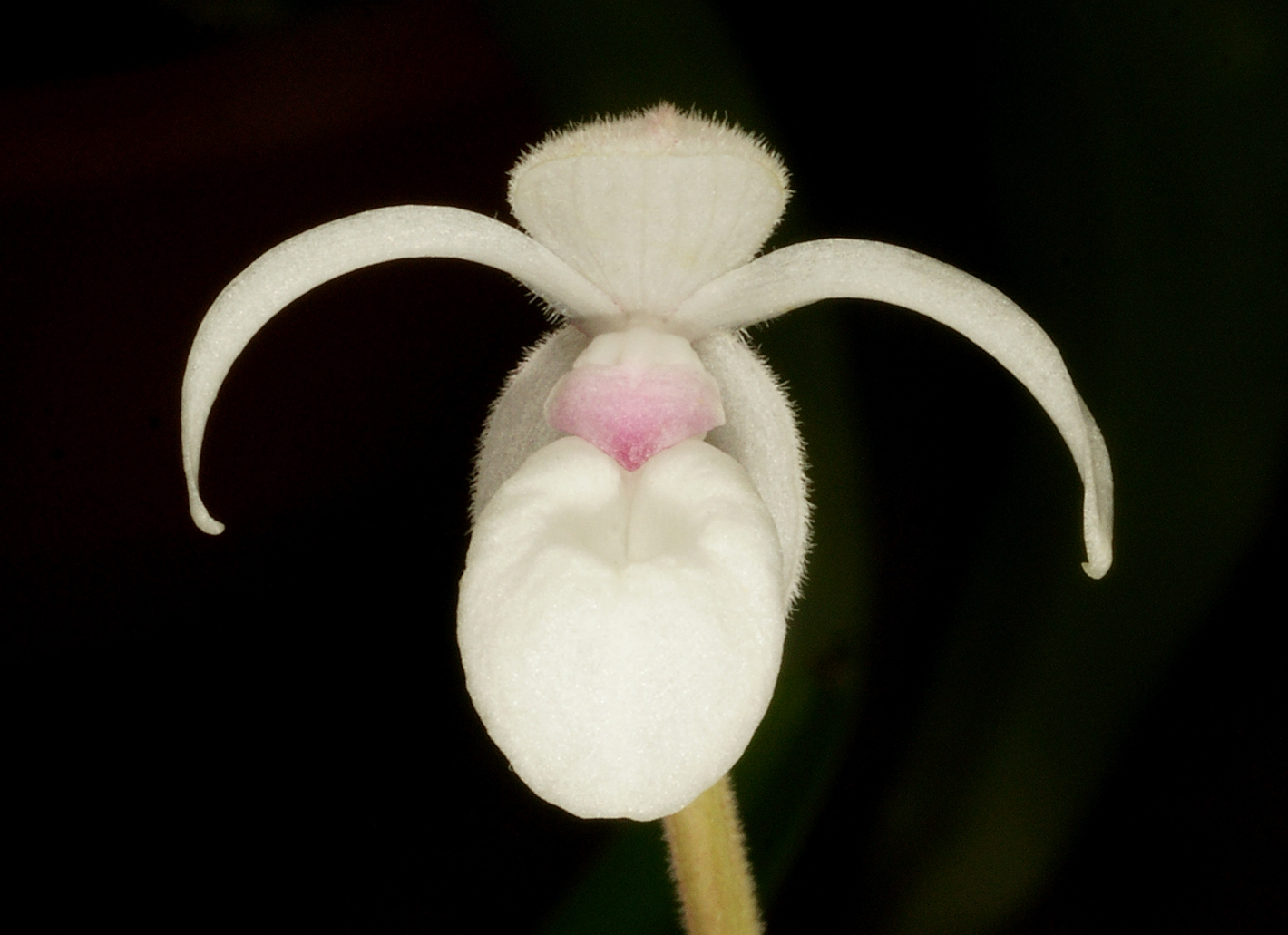
Flower
