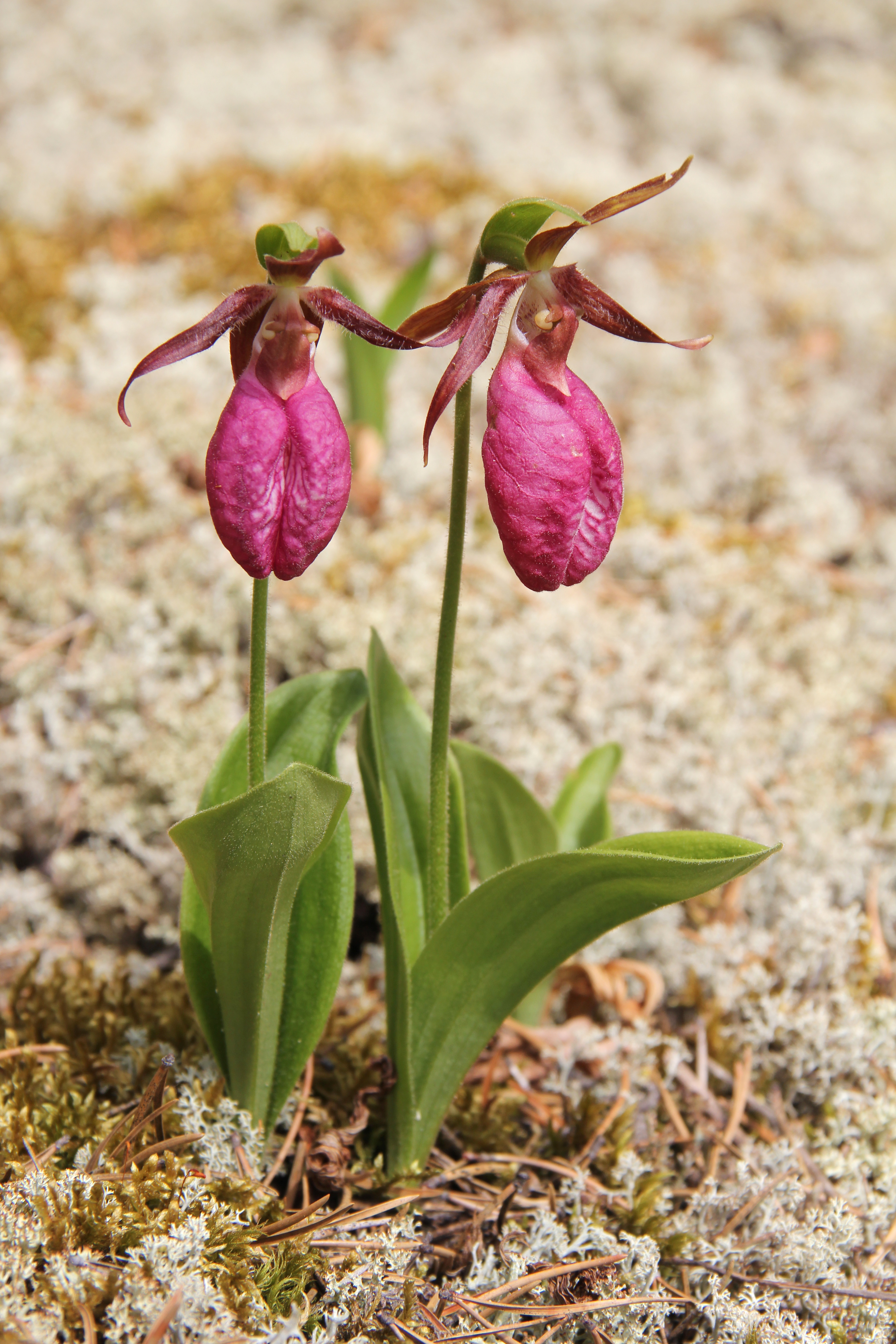

Conservation status
- Least Concern (IUCN 3.1)

- Secure (NatureServe)

Scientific classification
- Kingdom: Plantae
- Clade: Tracheophytes
- Clade: Angiosperms
- Clade: Monocots
- Order: Asparagales
- Family: Orchidaceae
- Subfamily: Cypripedioideae
- Genus: Cypripedium
- Species: C. acaule

Binomial name
- Cypripedium acaule Aiton

Synonyms
- List: Calceolus hirsutus (Mill.) Nieuwl.; Cypripedium acaule f. albiflora E.L.Rand & Redfield; Cypripedium acaule f. biflorum P.M.Br.; Cypripedium acaule f. lancifolia House; Cypripedium catesbianum Raf.; Cypripedium hirsutum Mill.; Cypripedium humile Salisb.; Cypripedium vittatum var. planum Raf.; Fissipes acaulis (Aiton) Small; Fissipes acaulis f. lancifolia House; Fissipes hirsuta (Mill.) Farw.; Fissipes hirsuta f. albiflora (E.L.Rand & Redfield) Farw.

= Cypripedium acaule =

Species of flowering plant in the orchid family

Cypripedium acaule, the pink lady's slipper or moccasin flower, is a species of flowering plant in the orchid family Orchidaceae native to eastern North America. It is currently the provincial flower of Prince Edward Island, Canada, and the state wildflower of New Hampshire, United States.

Indigenous peoples traditionally used this plant for medicinal purposes. For example, Algonquin people, who form part of the larger cultural group known as the Anishinaabeg, traditionally used C. acaule to treat menstrual disorders. Due to population decline, harvesting for medicinal purposes is no longer recommended. As C. acaule takes many years to go from seed to mature plant, the gathering of seed-bearing specimens is presently unsustainable.

== Name ==
Cypripedium acaule is commonly referred to in English as the pink lady's slipper or moccasin flower. The specific epithet acaule means "lacking an obvious stem", a reference to its short underground stem, for which reason the plant is also known as the stemless lady's-slipper. In Anishinaabemowin, it is known as makizinkewe.

== Description ==
Cypripedium acaule is a perennial plant. The plant has a solitary flower, which means only one flower blooms on its peduncle between the two large basal leaves per season. It grows slowly and up to 0.4 m (1 ft 4 in). The flowering season in their native range is between April and June and goes dormant after fruiting.

Unlike most other species of Cypripedium, the pouch of C. acaule opens in a slit that runs down the front of the labellum rather than a round opening. The plant consists of two plicate leaves near the ground. From between those leaves sprouts a long, pubescent stalk that bears a single pink flower. The sepals and petals tend to be yellowish-brown to maroon with a large pouch that is usually some shade of pink but can be white to nearly magenta. Leaves are simple, elliptical in shape and opposite in arrangement.

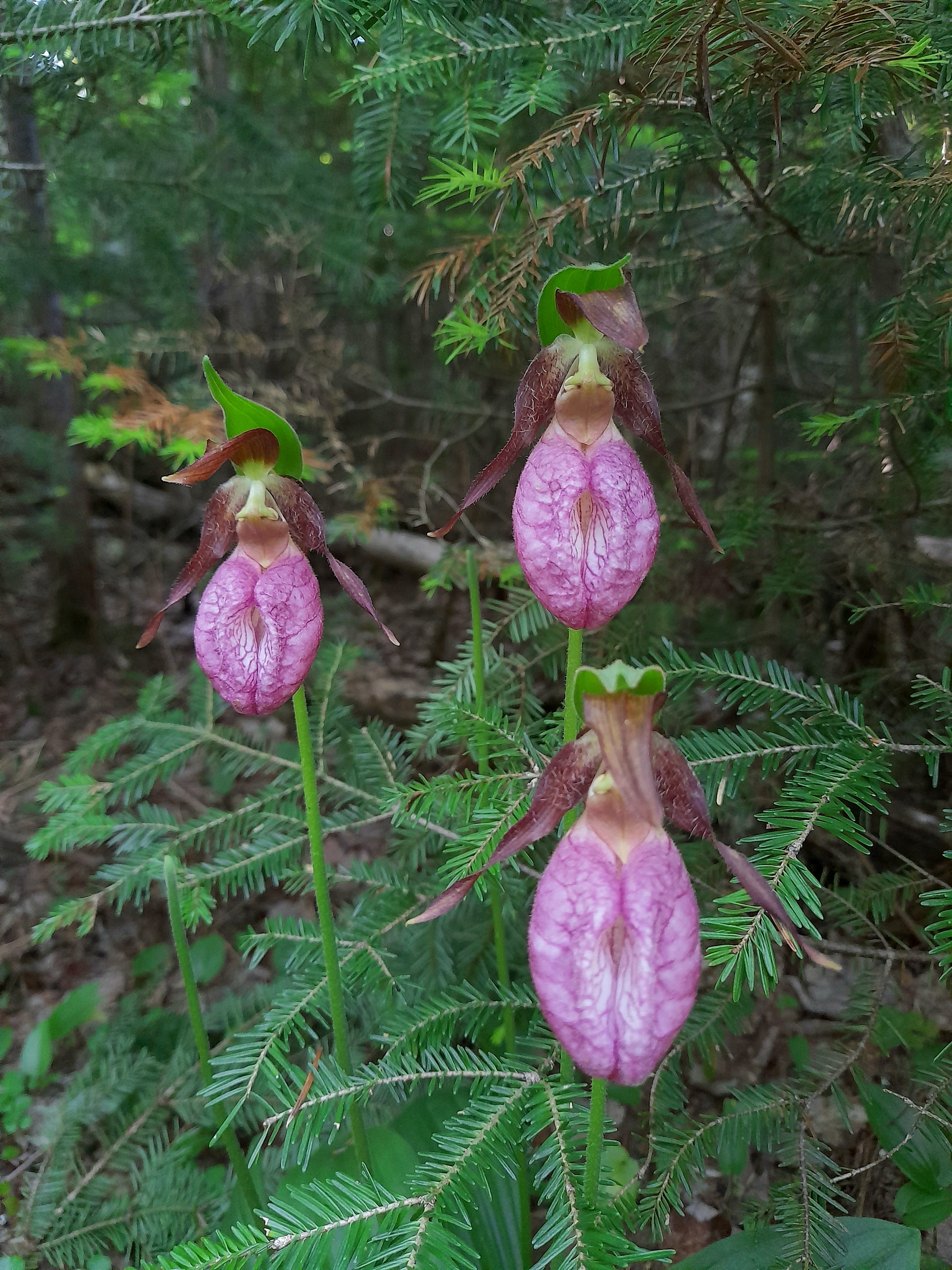
Plant in bloom near Mount Stewart, Prince Edward Island, Canada

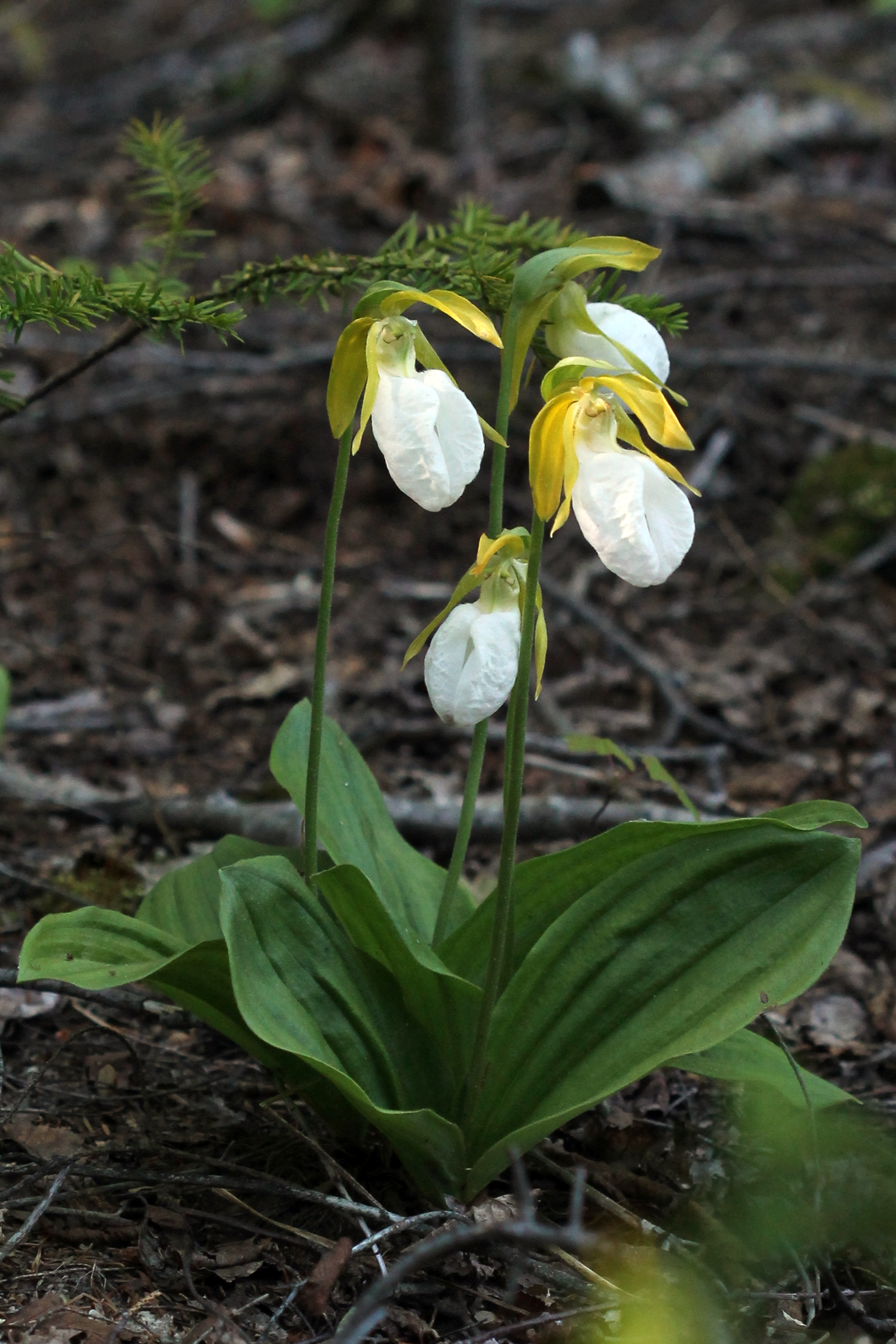
A form of Cypripedium acaule with a white pouch

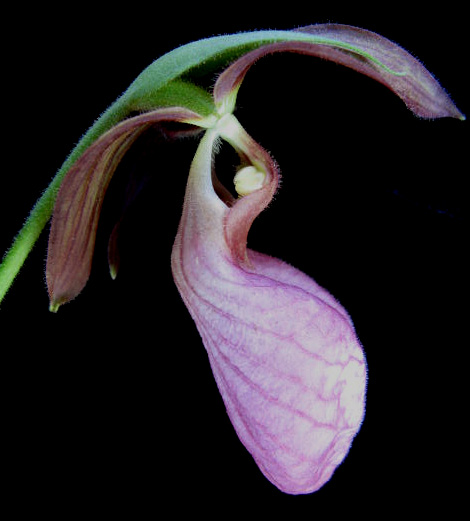
Side profile of flower

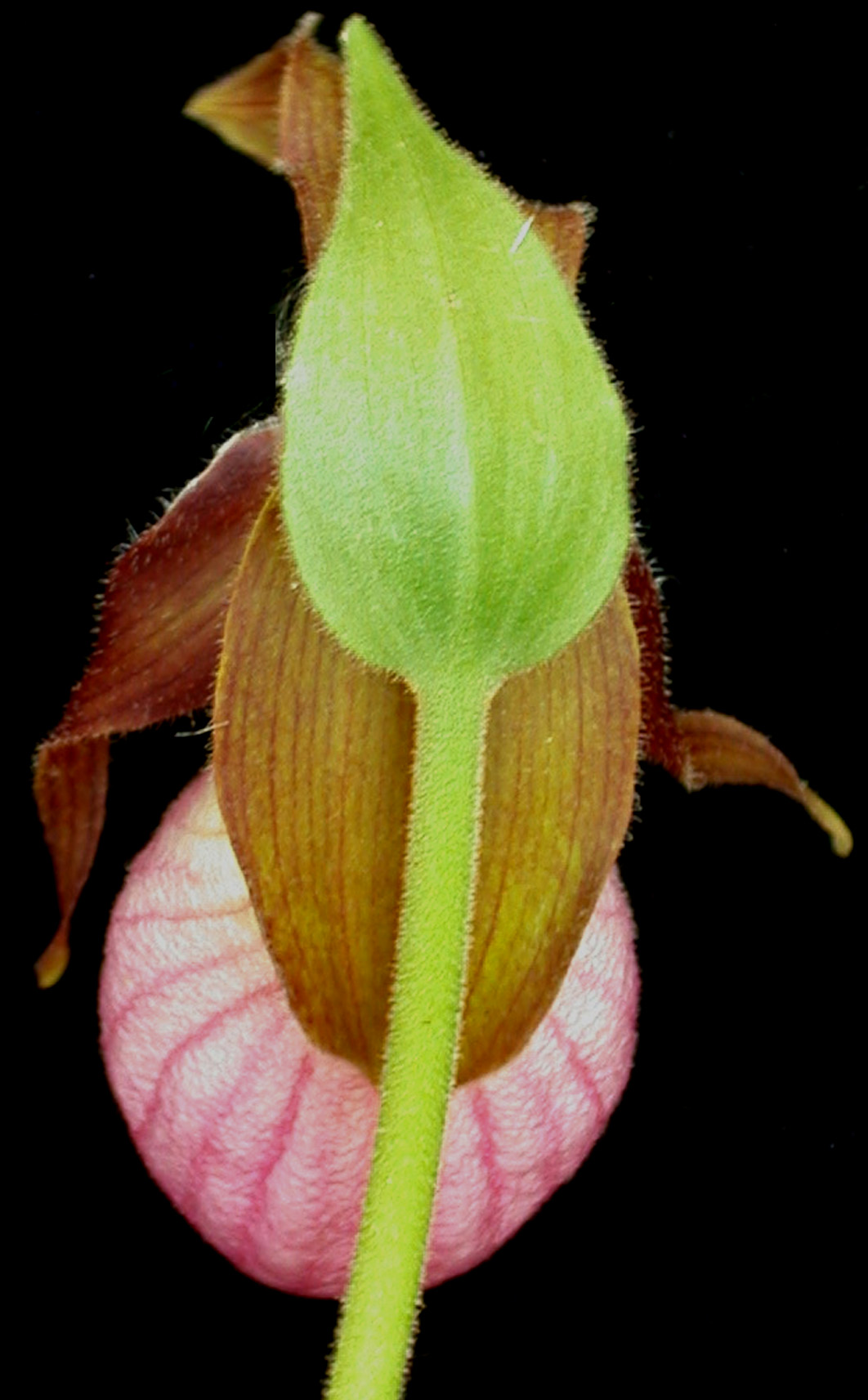
Back of flower

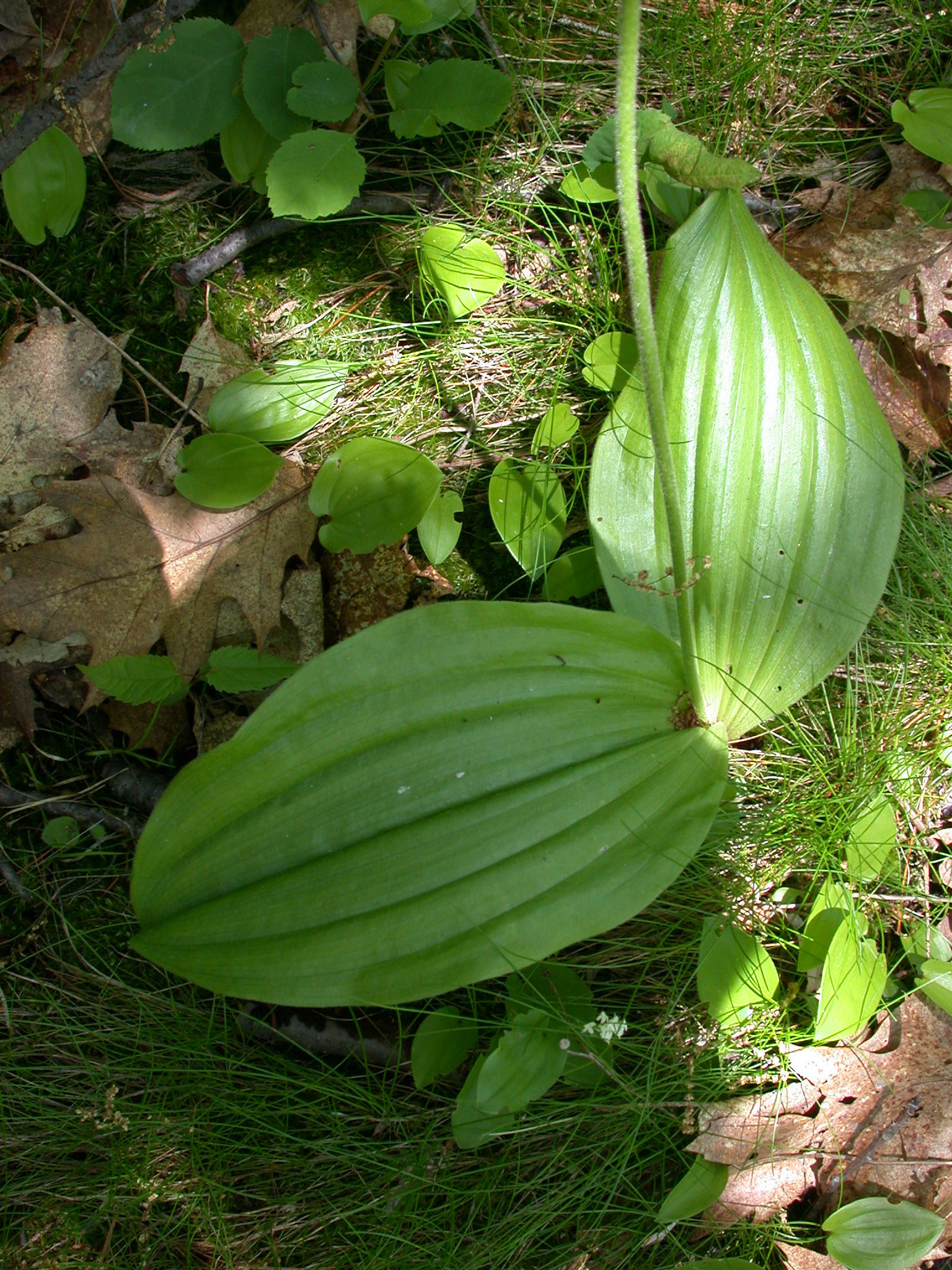
Leaves

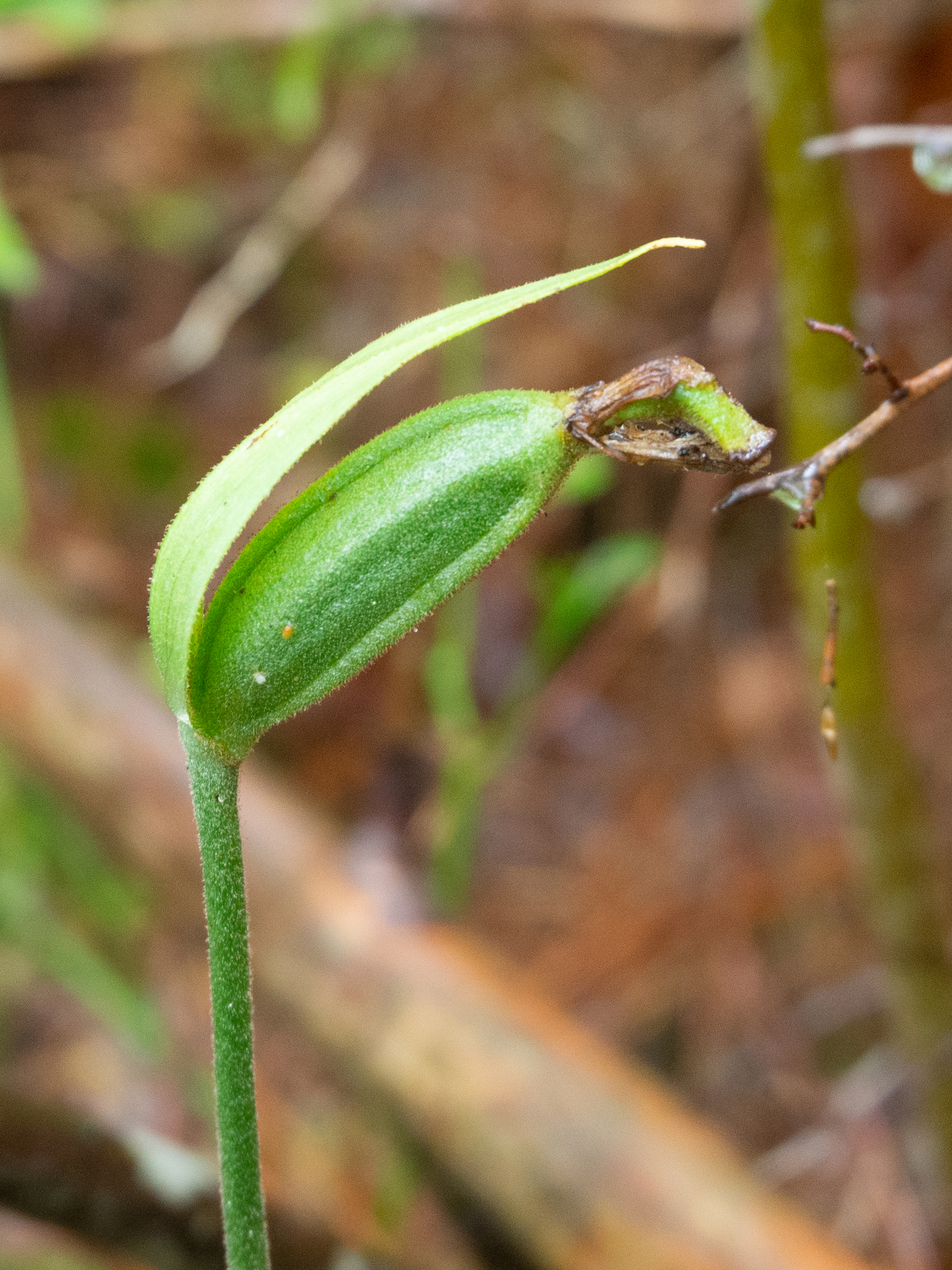
The fruit of Cypripedium acaule

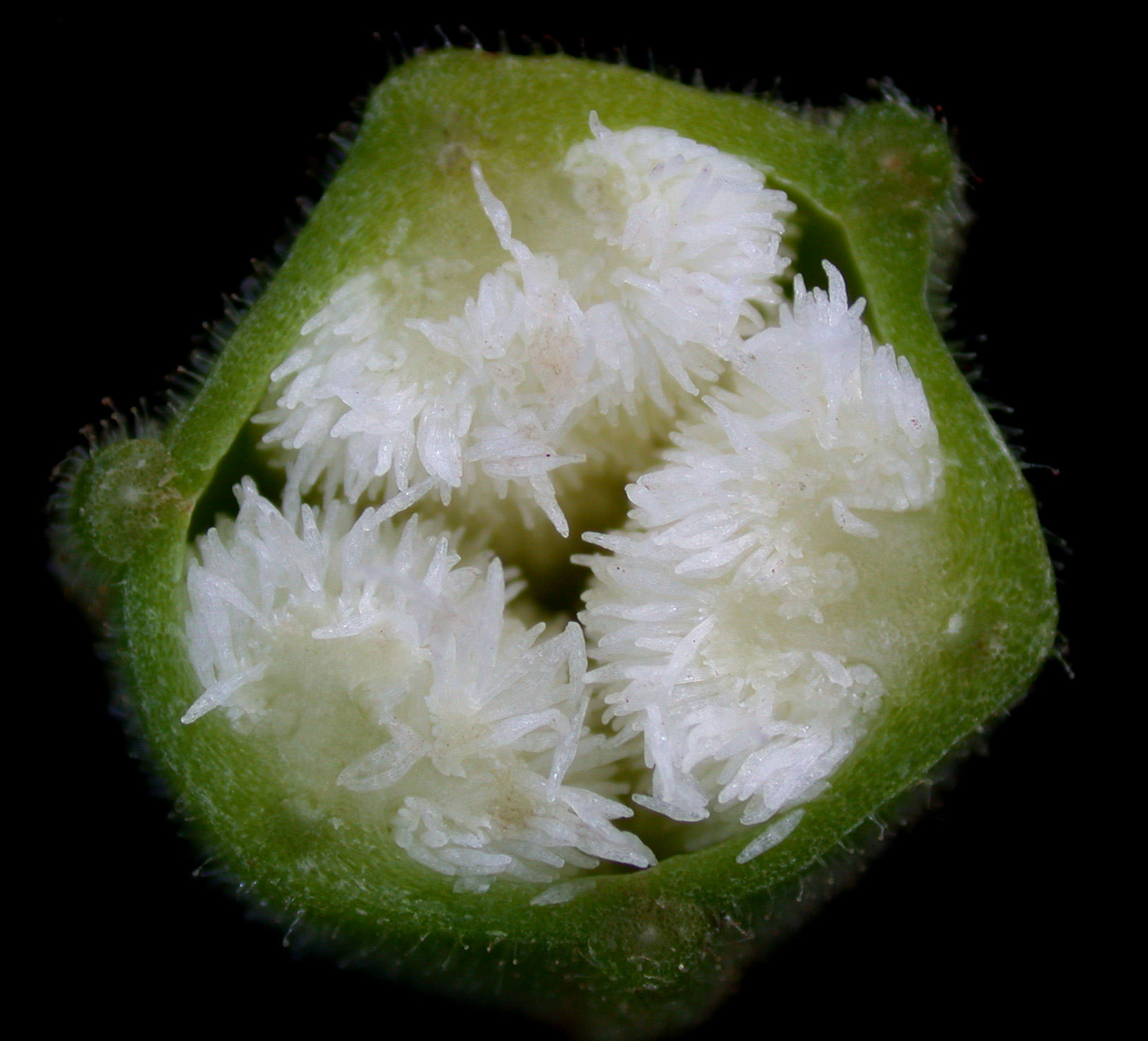
Cross section of fruit

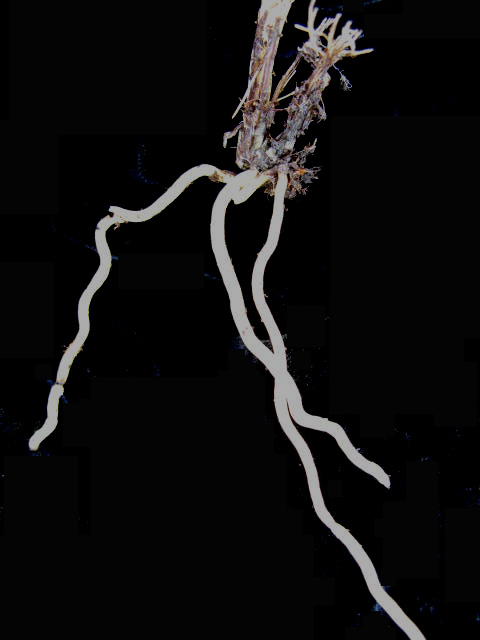
Roots

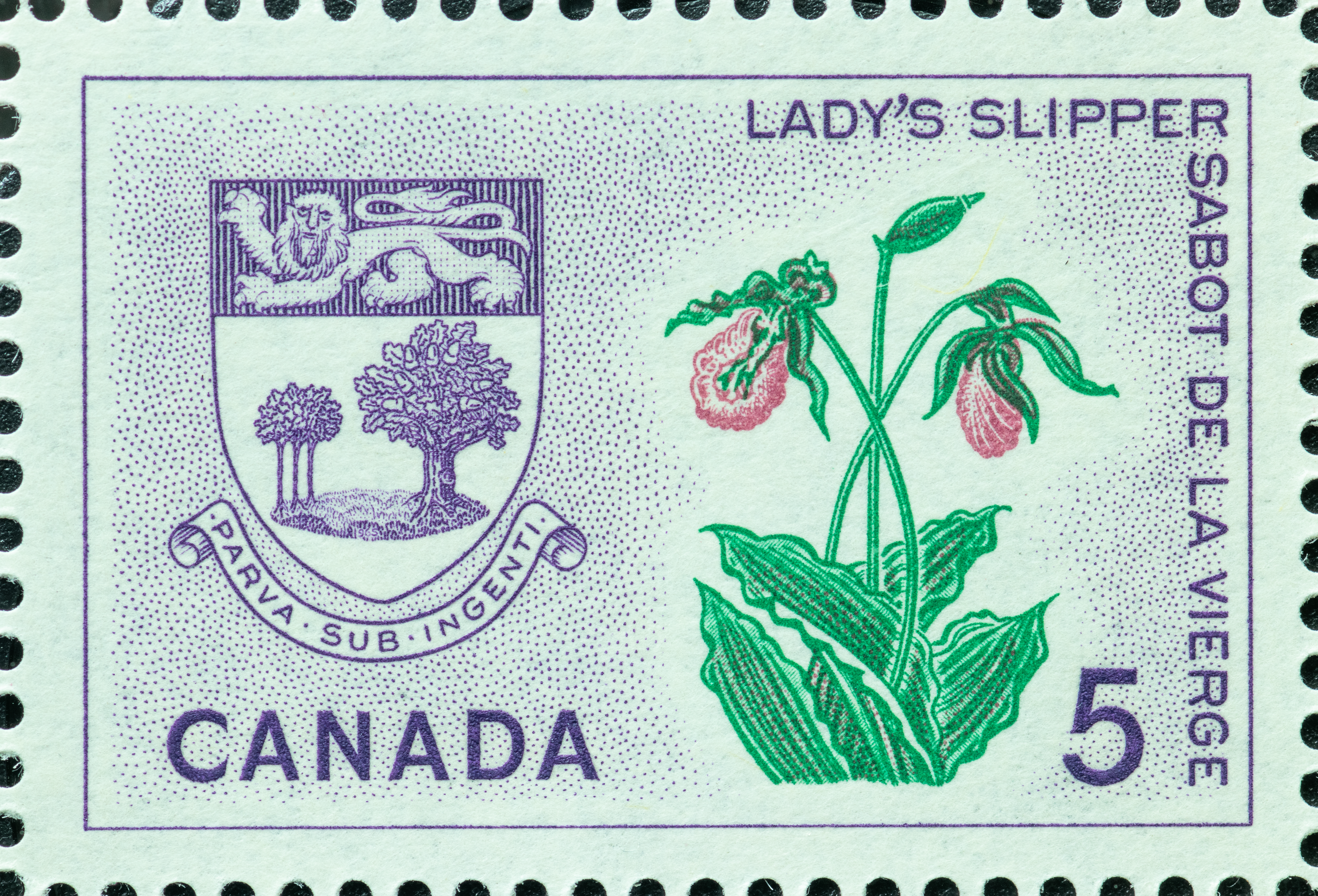
Canadian postage stamp

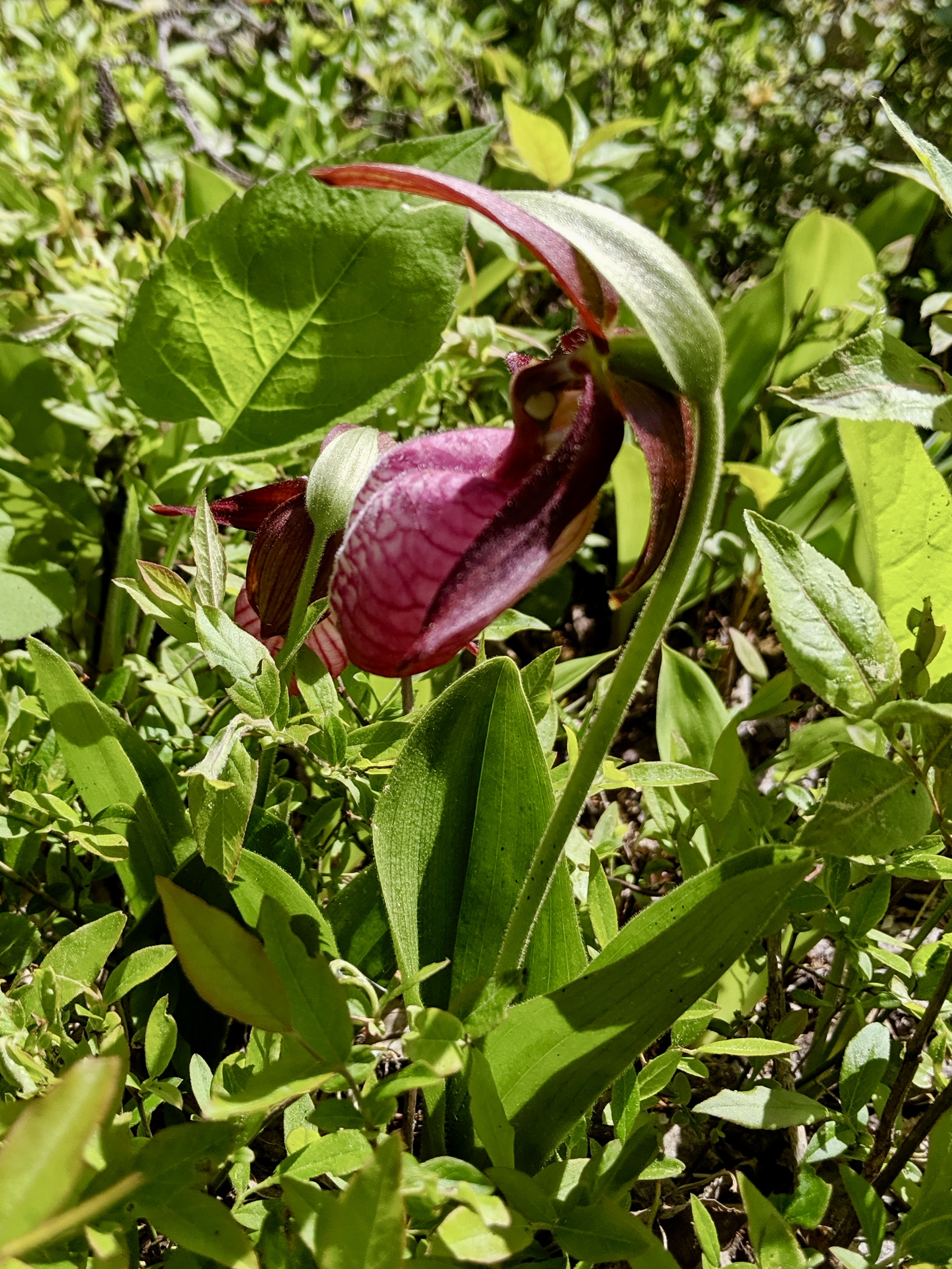
Red C. acaule flower bloom in June in NWO

== Taxonomy ==
The genus Cypripedium is one of five genera in the subfamily of slipper orchids Cypripedioideae. Cypripedium acaule was first described in the Western European tradition by the Scottish botanist William Aiton in 1789. He referred to it as the two-leaved lady's slipper.

As of September 2026, Kew's Plants of the World Online (POWO) does not accept any infraspecific names. POWO lists a dozen synonyms, one of which is Cypripedium acaule f. albiflorum E.L.Rand & Redfield, a form with pure white flowers, or white flowers with indistinct pink veins.

== Distribution and habitat ==
Cypripedium acaule can be found in the eastern third of the United States, particularly in the Great Lakes region and the Northeast in New Hampshire and Maine, south along the Appalachians to Alabama. It is widespread in Canada, where it is found in every province except British Columbia. It also occurs in the Northwest Territories and in Saint Pierre and Miquelon. Within its geographic range, it can be found in a wide variety of environments, from coastal plains, to pine barrens, to mountaintops.

C. acaule requires highly acidic soil and tolerates a range of shade and moisture, though it prefers at least partial shade and well-drained slopes. It is usually found in pine forests with sandy soils, where it can be seen in large colonies, but it also grows in deciduous woods. Since they are highly sensitive to shade and soil disturbances, they are classified as forest habitat species, which means that they are typically associated with shaded, mature forest conditions and any kinds of changes to its environment can have a potential negative impact on their population. It was long speculated that a fungal association was needed for growth, and that C. acaule could not be artificially cultivated outside of these associations. However, a greater understanding of orchids in general has shown that this association is only needed to germinate orchid seeds and is not required once plants begin making true leaves. Some disturbances that affects C. acaule's survival and population include canopy removal, forest floor and soil disturbance, all of which likely reduce the habitat suitability (shade, moisture, mycorrhizal associations).

C. acaule is considered endangered in Illinois and Tennessee, Vulnerable in New York, and Unusual in Georgia.

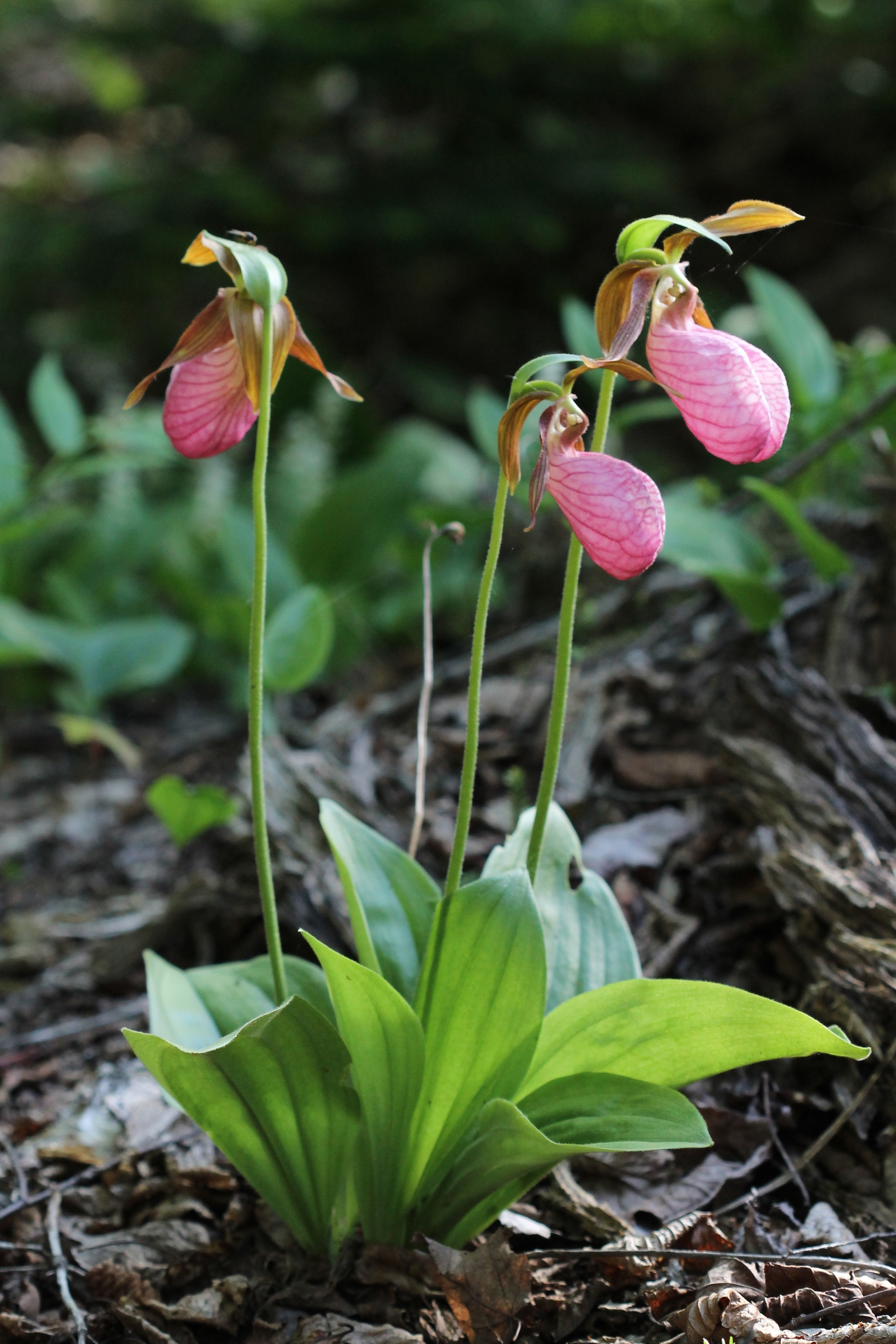
Plant growing in Sault Ste. Marie, Ontario, Canada

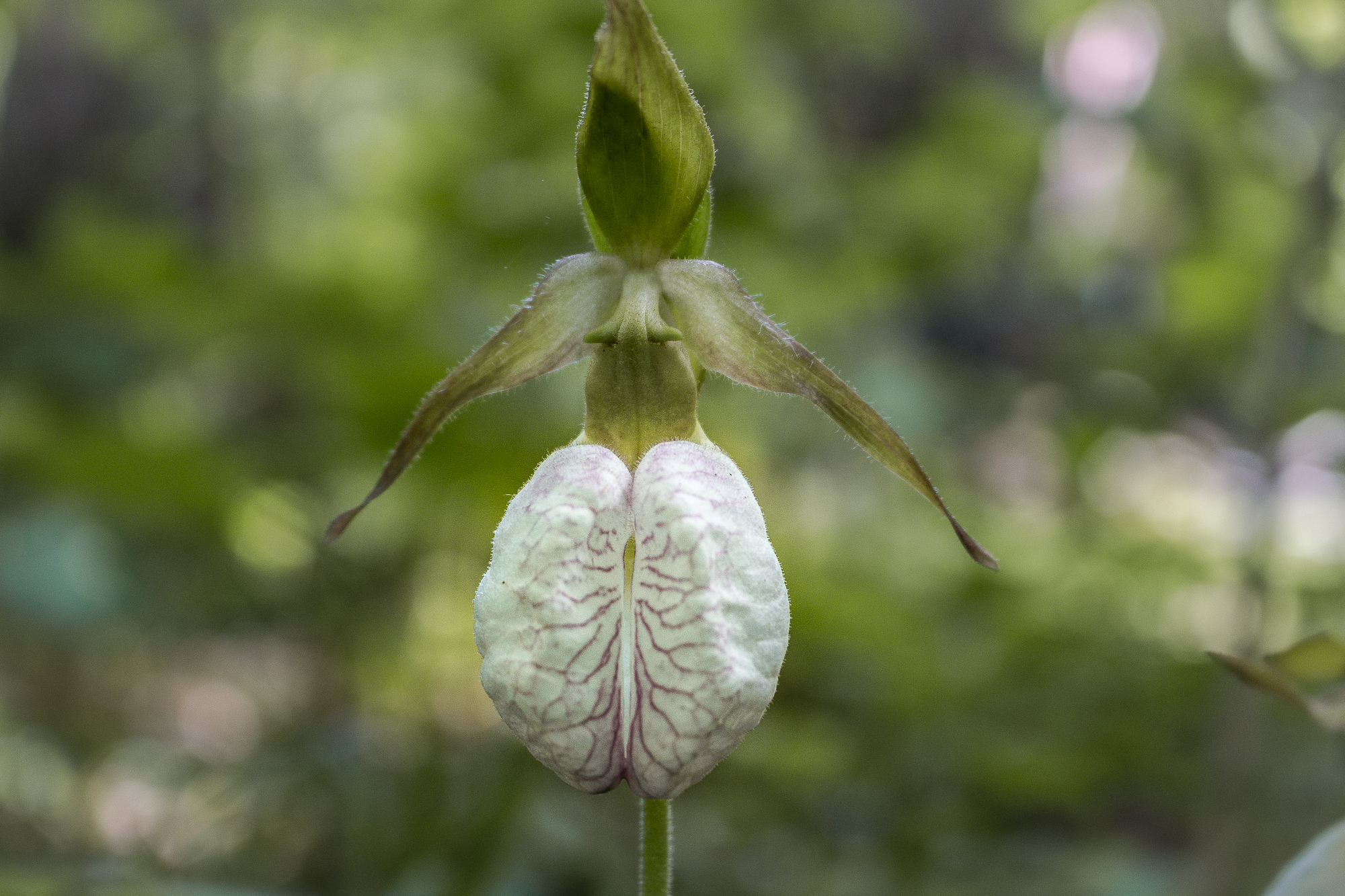
White pouch flower in Quebec, Canada

== Ecology ==
=== Pollination ===
They get pollinated by attracting bees into the slit of the pink flower, but the bees eventually stop visiting them as it provides them with no benefits. Therefore, they are also called non-rewarding flowers because they offer no food or even produce any nectar but still get pollinated. The two main frequent pollinators observed visiting C. acaule are B. vagans and B. borealis queens, therefore it is believed that queen bees are their primary pollinators.

C.acaule, like many other orchids rely on pollinator deception, which means they attract insects via colour, shape and scent cues instead of providing nectar. The labellum in Cypripedium acaule acts like a one way trap. Once a bee enters, it must crawl past the stigma, depositing pollen from previous flowers it has visited, and then the anther, receiving pollen. Self-pollination can occur but typically requires that the pollinator re-enters the same flower. In this process they pollinate the flower by first picking up pollen from the male counterpart and depositing it to the female counterpart.

Once pollinated, the ovary of the flower turns into an oblong shaped green seed pod with pointy ends. The seed pod supposedly stays green until the temperature drops and them splits open releasing tiny powdery seeds that resembles white pepper.

== Cultivation ==
Seed germination labs have increased the commercial availability of C. acaule, although it still tends to be less commonly available than other Cypripedium species and hybrids. This is primarily due to the extra care that must be provided if the growing site is not naturally suitable for in-ground cultivation. This plant grows in soils below a pH of 5, often at 4–4.5. At this high acidity soil fungus is suppressed, and C. acaule can thrive. There is even evidence that it is partially myco-heterotrophic, parasitizing fungus that attempts to invade its roots. However, in soils above pH 5, soil microbes become more than C. acaule can manage, and the plants rot. Although, C. acaule is photosynthetic, it still relies on specific fungal partners for nutrient exchange. These fungi colonize the orchid roots and form structures called pelotons, which allows for nutrient transfer.

Seedlings germinated in a sterile environment can grow and thrive in a much higher pH than 5, but must be grown below 5 if removed from the sterility.

For artificial cultivation, container culture is a must, and the growing medium must be naturally acidic. Additionally, all other soil additives must be devoid of any calcium that could buffer the pH to above 5. High quality peat moss or pine duff work well, and pH neutral perlite can be added to improve porosity. Due to the risk of calcium bicarbonate, tap water is unsuitable. Rainwater or distilled water mixed with 2 ounces (57 g) of vinegar per gallon will assure that a reliably high acidity is maintained in the growing medium. Give bright dappled shade or morning sun. Sink pots in winter or store in a cold frame for insulation. Given these conditions, C. acaule can thrive indefinitely, but it will always require much more maintenance than other species/hybrids that can be grown in a wider pH range.

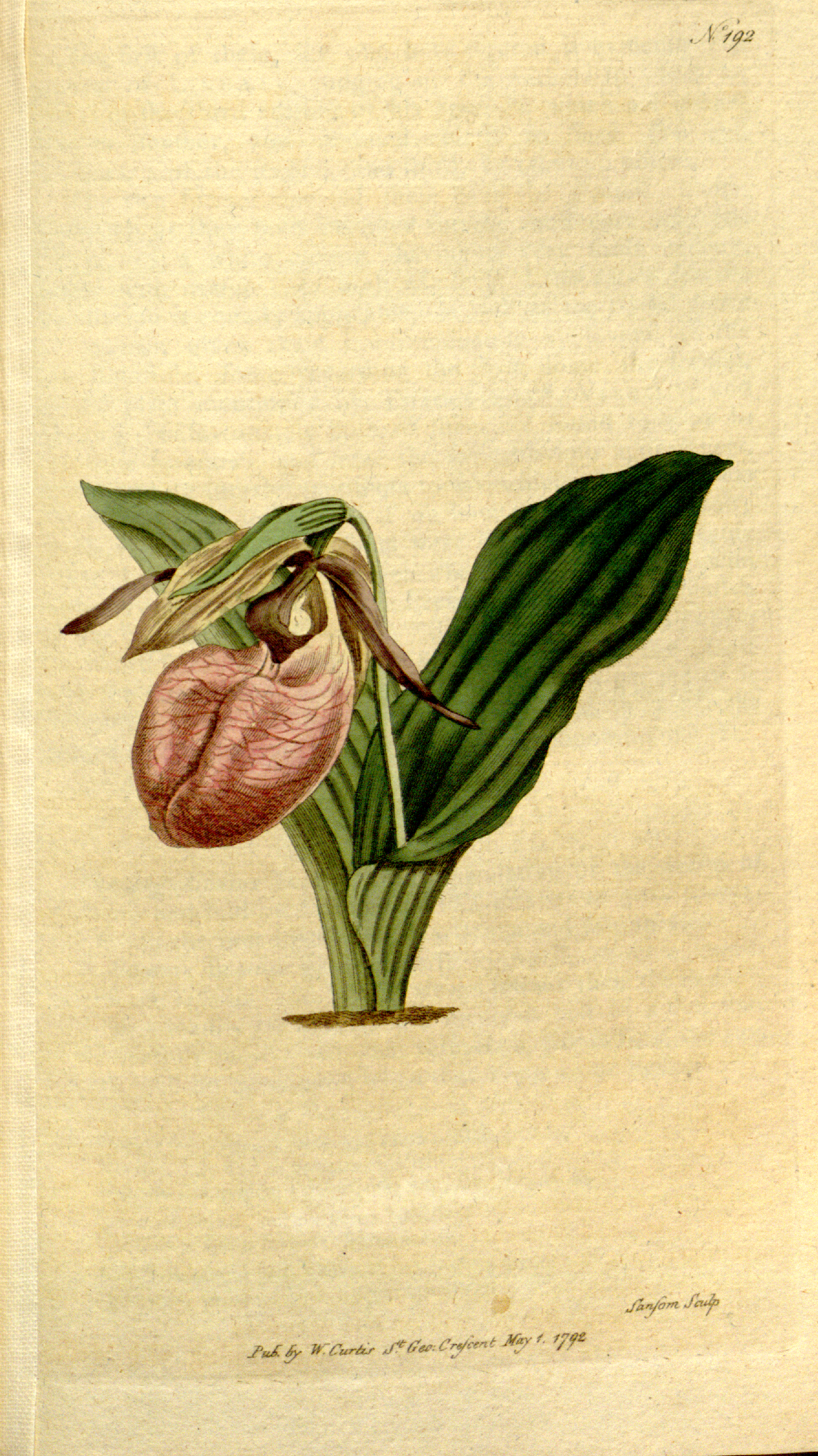
A drawing published in Curtis's Botanical Magazine in 1793
