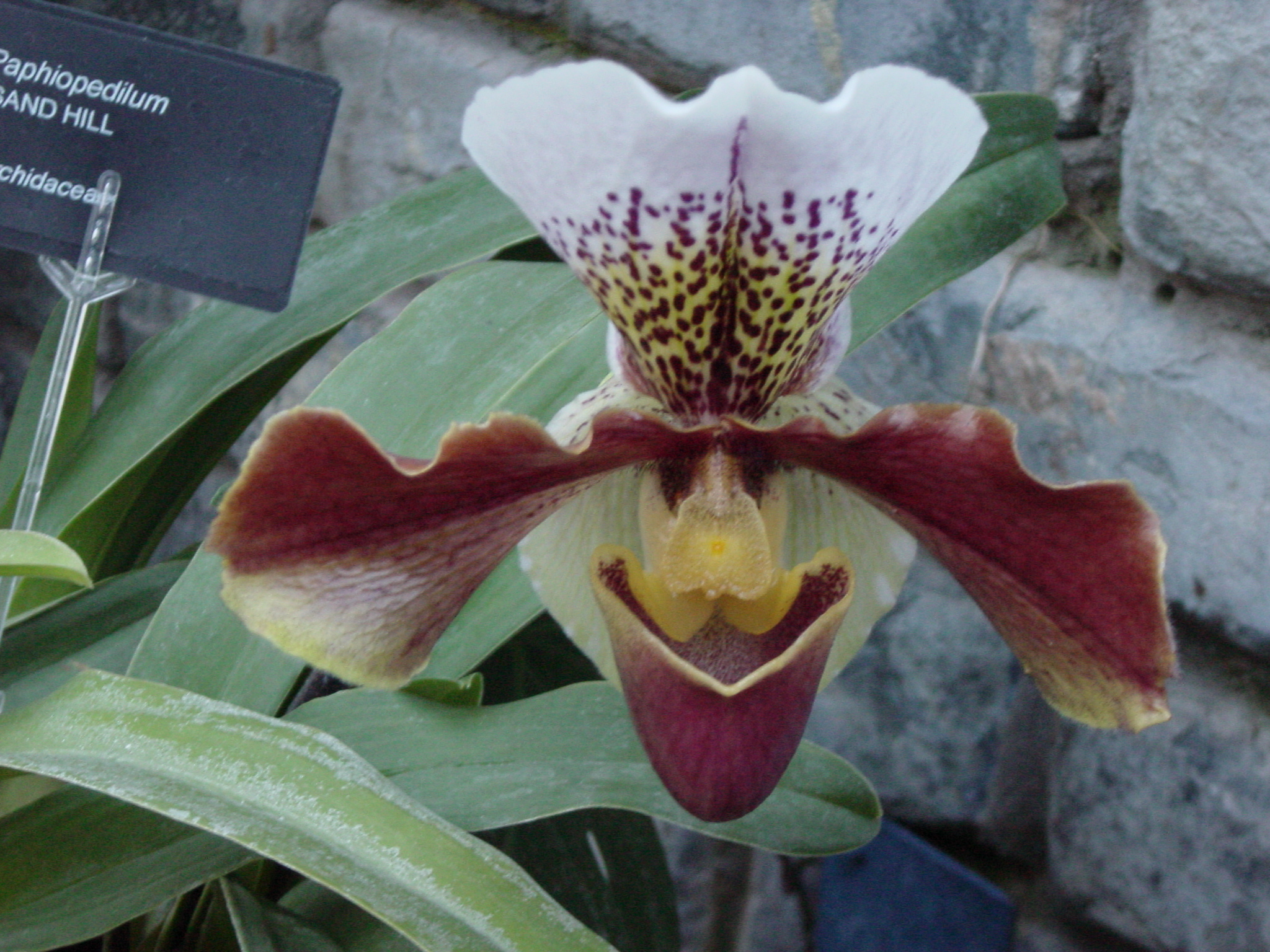
- Slipper orchid of the genus Paphiopedilum

Scientific classification
- Kingdom: Plantae
- Clade: Embryophytes
- Clade: Tracheophytes
- Clade: Angiosperms
- Clade: Monocots
- Order: Asparagales
- Family: Orchidaceae
- Subfamily: Cypripedioideae; Kostel.

Genera
- See text and Taxonomy of the orchid family.
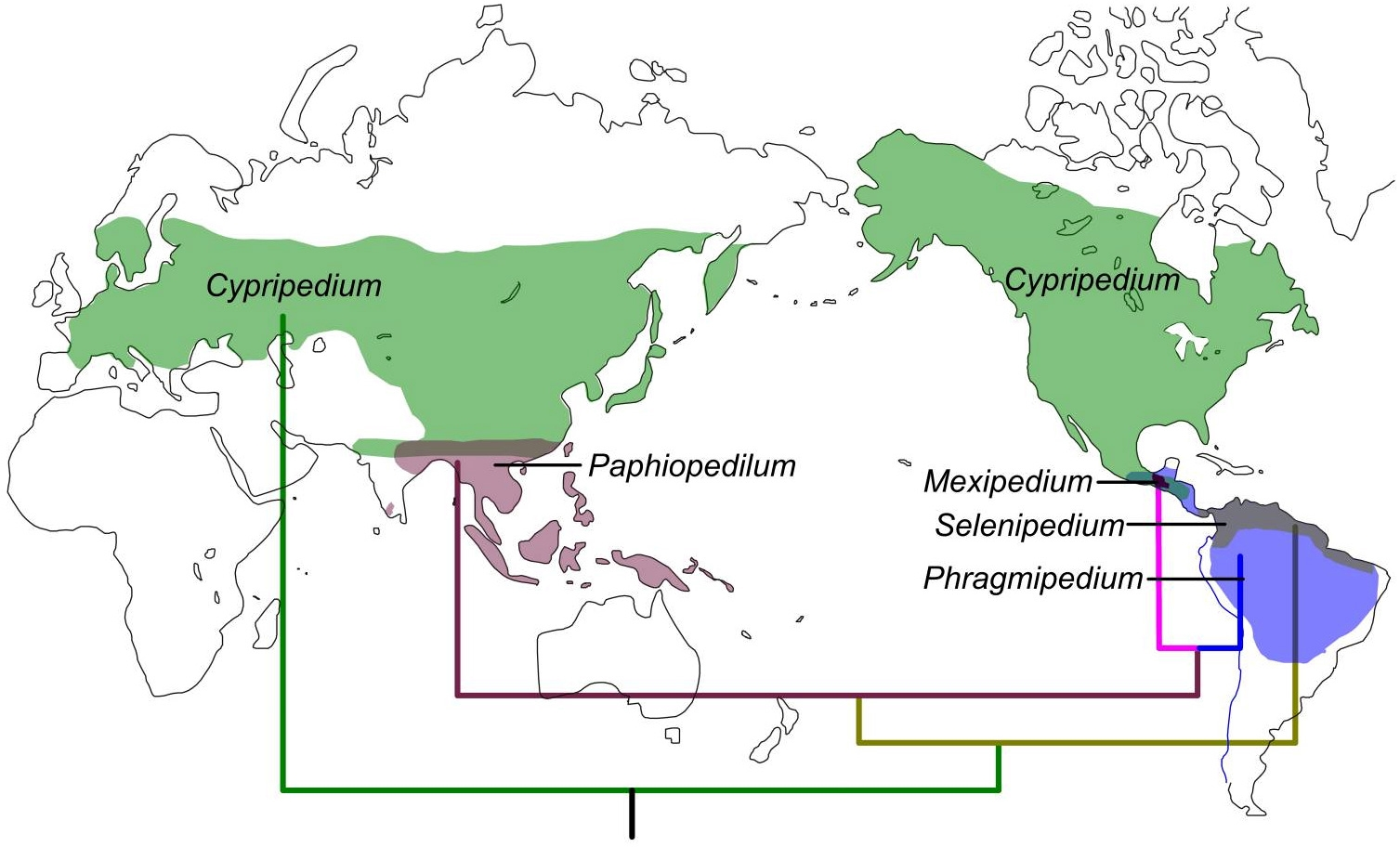
- Cypripedioideae genera range

= Cypripedioideae =

Lady's slipper orchid

Subfamily of orchids

Cypripedioideae is a subfamily of orchids commonly known as lady's slipper orchids, lady slipper orchids or slipper orchids. Cypripedioideae includes the genera Cypripedium, Mexipedium, Paphiopedilum, Phragmipedium and Selenipedium. They are characterised by the slipper-shaped pouches (modified labella) of the flowers – the pouch traps insects so they are forced to climb up past the staminode, behind which they collect or deposit pollinia, thus fertilizing the flower. There are approximately 165 species in the subfamily.

== Description ==
All representatives of the Cypripedioideae are perennial, herbaceous plants. The fleshy roots sometimes possess a veil. The leaves are arranged spirally or in two rows, the shoot is slender or compressed. In the bud, the leaves are rolled and the leaf blade is plikat (folded) or the leaves are folded in the bud, smooth and leathery. There is no dividing tissue between leaf and shoot.

The inflorescence of the Cypripedioideae are terminal and mostly unbranched. The flowers are spiral or in two lines on the shoot, they are resupinated. The petals are in two threefold circles, with mostly two petals of the outer circle are completely fused. The labellum forms a sac-like structure. The ovary is under constant and one-chambered or three-chambered. Two fertile stamens, a staminode and style are fused into a complex structure. The stylus is short and thick, the stigma is large and convex, the central lobe of the stigma is larger than the two lateral ones. The two lateral stamens are fertile, the pollen grains are glued together to form a paste or formed into connected pollinia in some Phragmipedium species. The middle, barren stamen is shield-shaped widened. The fruits are mostly capsule fruits, with Selenipedium they are berry-like. They contain numerous flattened seeds, about a millimeter long and 0.1 millimeters wide. In contrast, the seeds of Selenipedium are lens-shaped and have a hard seed coat.

Chromosome numbers vary within the subfamily over a wide range from 2n=20 in Cypripedium to 26 to 44 chromosomes in Paphiopedilum. The chromosomes are quite large.

The species in this subfamily form trap flowers in which insect access to the saclike lip from the front is quite easy. The inside is shaped in such a way that the insects climb out of the flower past the stigma and the stamens and thereby pollinate the flower.

== Distribution ==
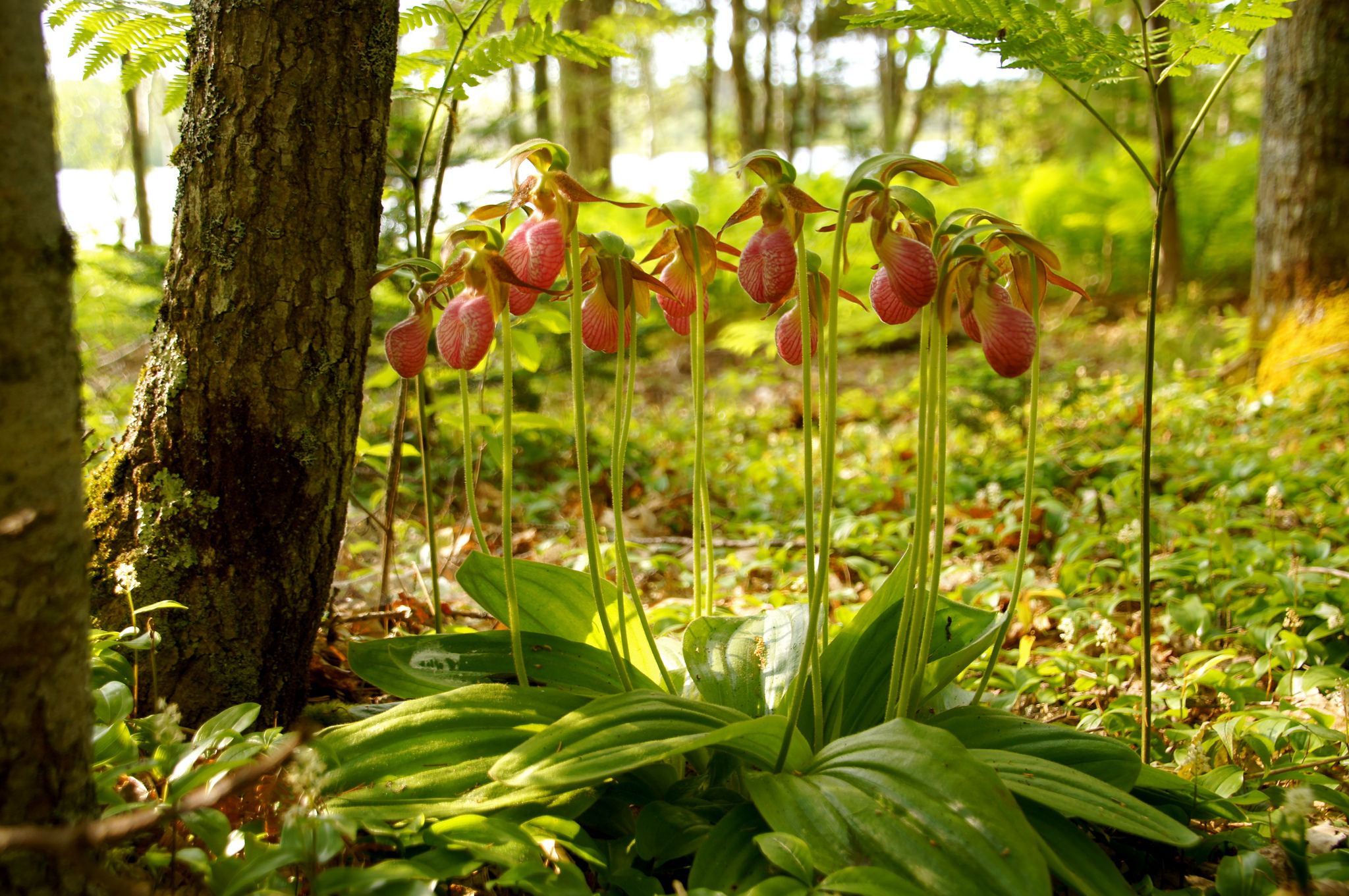
Pink lady's slippers in Nova Scotia, Canada

The species in the subfamily Cypripedioideae are found in northern South America and Central America (Mexipedium, Phragmipedium, Selenipedium), circumboreal in North America, Europe, Africa (Algeria) and in northern Asia (Cypripedium) as well as in subtropical and tropical Southeast Asia (Paphiopedilum). They do not occur in Australia and Africa. The spread could have started from a center of origin in Central America.

== Pollination ==
Plants in this subgenus use a common trap-lip pollination mechanism where flowers use mimicry and deception for pollination by bees and hoverflys. The flowers act as traps where insects enter a dorsal opening and leave through small lateral openings. When entering these traps the insects squeeze beneath the stigma, depositing the pollen and receive pollen through the anther while exiting.

== Taxonomy ==
Unlike most other orchids, slipper orchids have two fertile anthers — they are "diandrous". For that reason, experts have debated whether this clade should be classified within the orchid family (Orchidaceae), or whether they should compose a separate family altogether called Cypripediaceae. Around the year 2000, molecular phylogenetics and DNA sampling have come to play an increasingly important role in classification. This has led to the conclusion that recognition of a distinct family Cypripediaceae would be inappropriate.

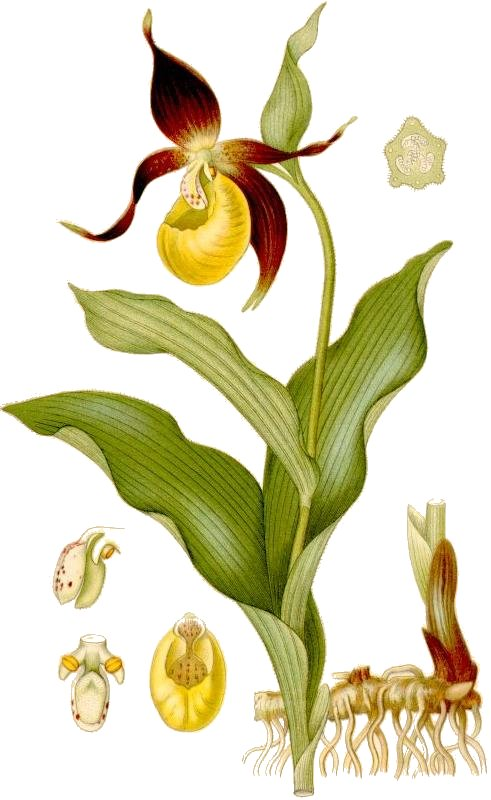
Lady's slipper orchid (Cypripedium calceolus)

The subfamily Cypripedioideae is monophyletic and consists of five genera:

- Cypripedium, found across much of North America, as well as in parts of Europe (one species), Africa (only in Algeria has been discovered in 2019) and Asia. The state flower of Minnesota is the showy lady's slipper (Cypripedium reginae); the pink lady's slipper (Cypripedium acaule) is the official flower of the Canadian province of Prince Edward Island.
- Mexipedium, a monotypic genus, consisting of a single species that was found in a single locality in Oaxaca, Mexico.
- Paphiopedilum, found in the tropical forests of southeast Asia reaching as far north as southern China. Paphiopedilum is quite easy to cultivate and therefore is popular among orchid enthusiasts. In fact, over-collection of this genus has been so extensive that many species are now sub-viable in their natural habitats.
- Phragmipedium, found across northern South and Central America, is also easy to cultivate as it requires lower temperatures than Paphiopedilum, eliminating the need for a greenhouse in many areas.
- Selenipedium, found in Central and South America.

Phylogenetic relationships of Cypripedioideae genera
- Cypripedioideae
  - - - - - Phragmipedium Rolfe
          - Mexipedium V.A.Albert & M.W.Chase
        - Paphiopedilum Pfitzer
      - - Selenipedium Wall. ex Rchb.f.
  - - Cypripedium L.

=== Intergeneric hybrids ===
Hybrids between the genera in this subfamily are placed in the following nothogenera:

- × Cyphiopedilum (Cphd.) = Cypripedium × Paphiopedilum
- × Cyphragmipedium (Cgd.) = Cypripedium × Phragmipedium
- × Phragmipaphium (Phrphm.) = Paphiopedilum × Phragmipedium

Hybrids with genera outside of the subfamily are not known as of 2017.
