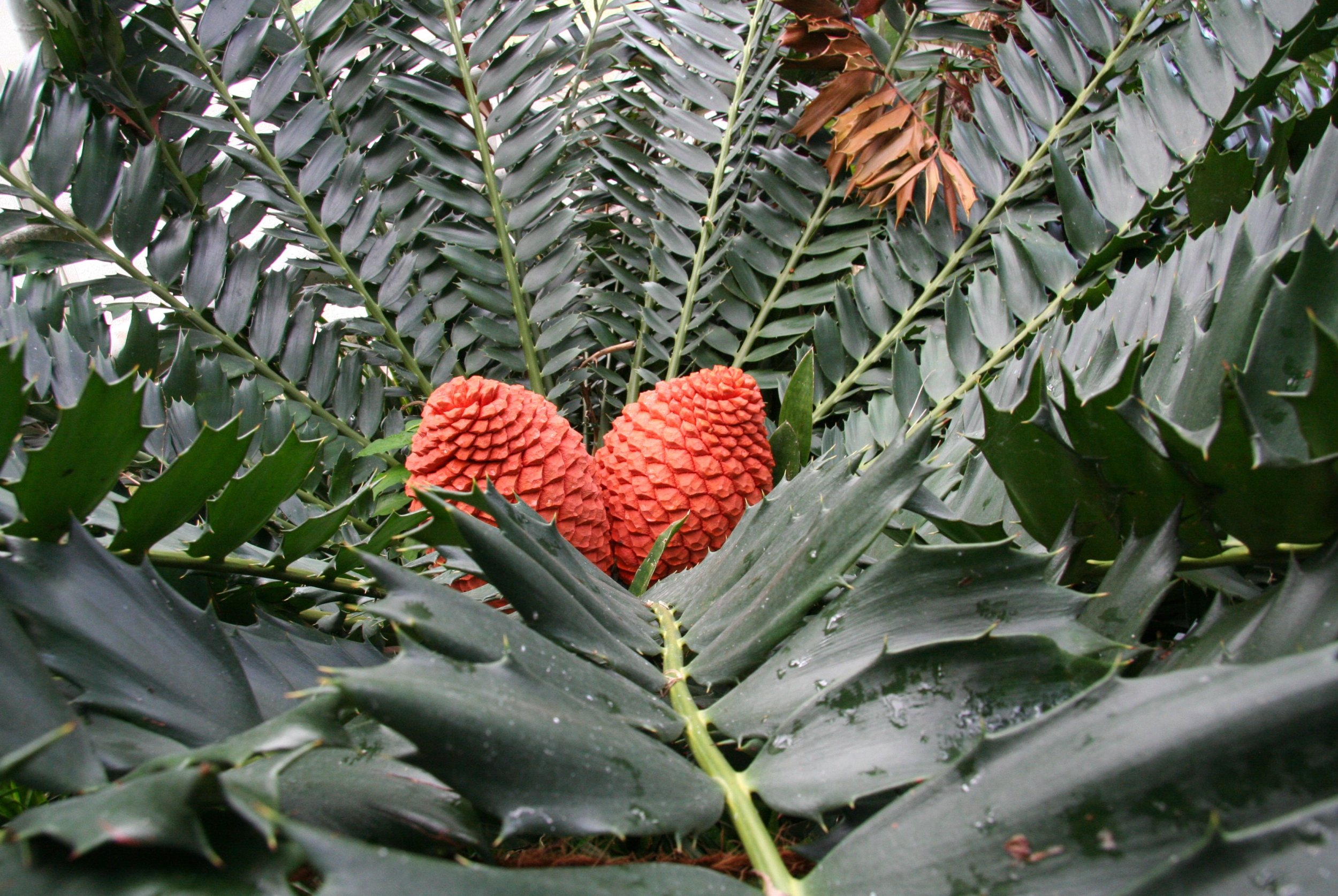
- Encephalartos ferox

Conservation status
- CITES Appendix I

Scientific classification
- Kingdom: Plantae
- Clade: Embryophytes
- Clade: Tracheophytes
- Clade: Gymnosperms
- Division: Cycadophyta
- Class: Cycadopsida
- Order: Cycadales
- Family: Zamiaceae
- Subfamily: Encephalartoideae
- Tribe: Encephalarteae
- Subtribe: Encephalartinae; Benth. & Hook.f.
- Genus: Encephalartos; Lehm.

Type species
- Encephalartos friderici-guilielmi Lehm.
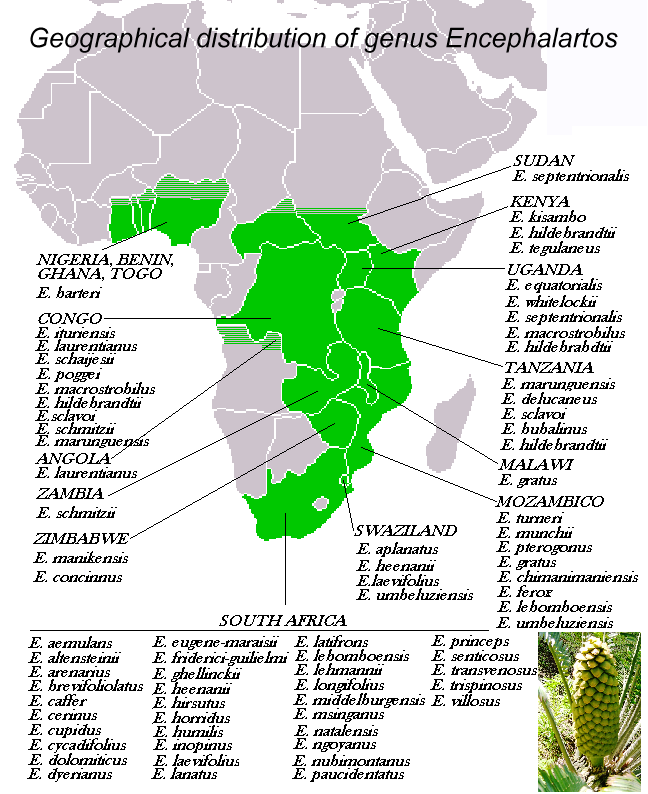
- geographical distribution of genus

= Encephalartos =

Genus of cycads

Encephalartos is a genus of cycad native to Africa. Several species of Encephalartos are commonly referred to as bread trees, or bread palms since a bread-like starchy food can be prepared from the centre of the stem. The genus name is derived from Ancient Greek ἐγκέφαλος (encéphalos), meaning "head", and ἄρτος (ártos), meaning "bread", referring to the use of the pith to make food. They are, in evolutionary terms, some of the most primitive living gymnosperms.

All the species are endangered, some critically, due to their exploitation by collectors and traditional medicine gatherers. The whole genus is listed under CITES Appendix I which prohibits international trade in specimens of these species except for certain non-commercial motives, such as scientific research.

== Description ==
Several of the species possess stout trunks. In E. cycadifolius, the main trunks are up to 10 feet (3.0 m) high, and several of them may be united at a base where a former main trunk once grew. The persistent, pinnate leaves are arranged in a terminal spreading crown, or ascending. The rigid leaflets are variously spiny or incised along their margins. The leaflets have a number of parallel veins and no central vein. The chromosome count is 2n=18.

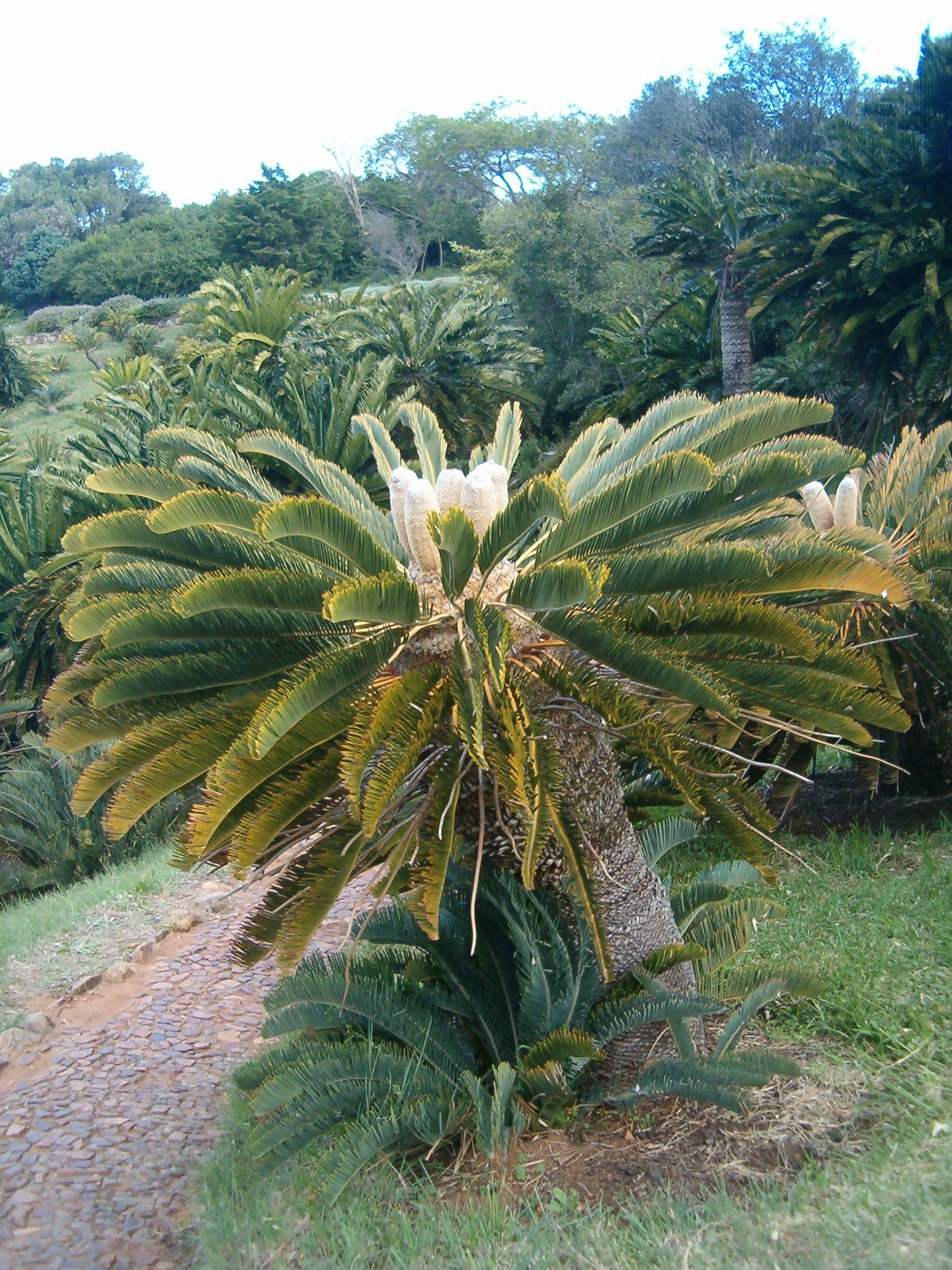
Encephalartos friderici-guilielmi

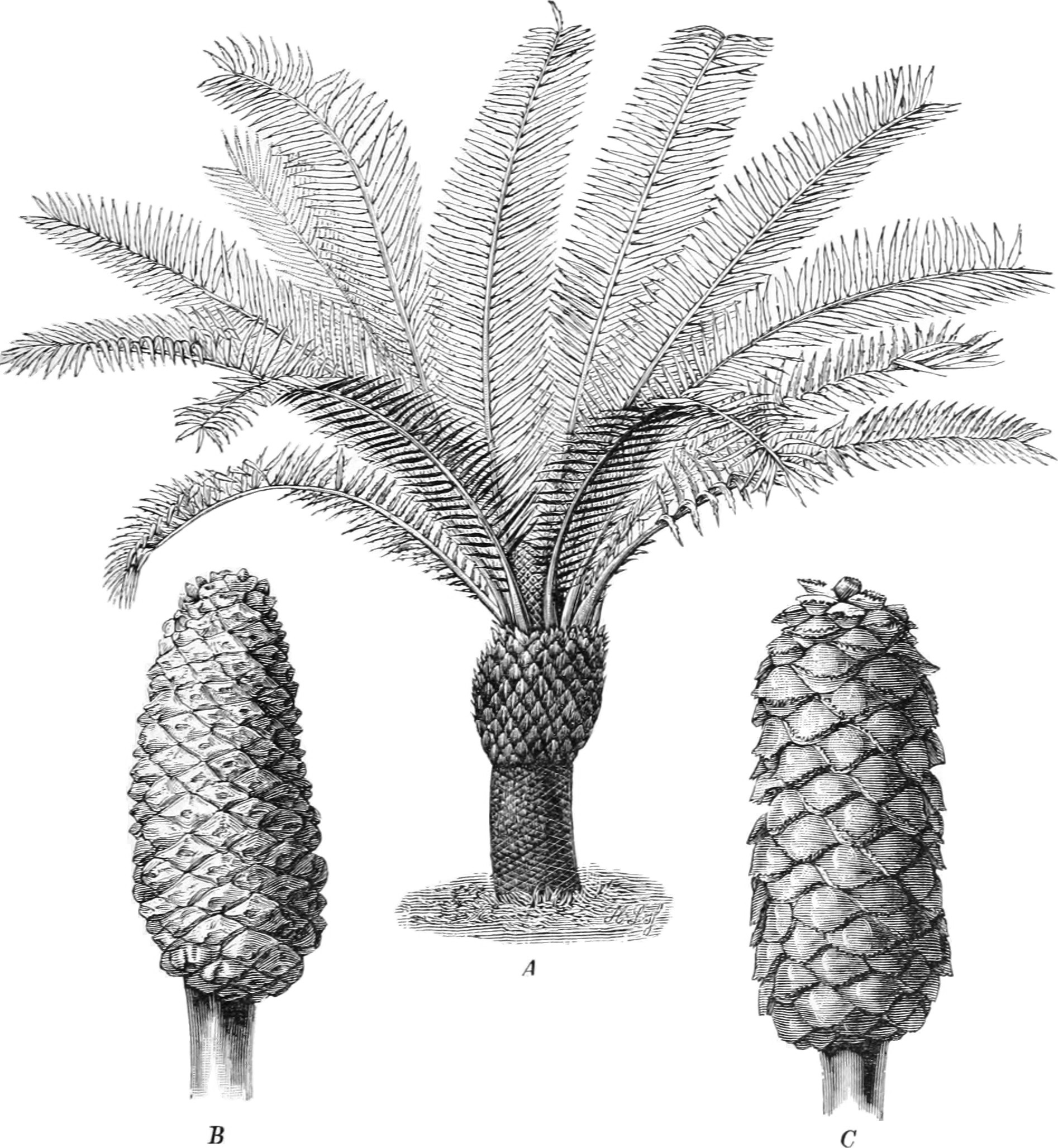
a) habit of female E. hildebrandtii
b) seed cone of the same, and
c) seed cone of E. villosus

=== Cones ===
Male cones are elongated, and three or four may appear at a time. Female cones are borne singly, or up to three at a time, and may weigh up to 60 pounds (27 kg). In some species, male cones with ripe pollen emit a nauseating odour. When the pollen has been shed and the males cones decay, a strong odour of acetic acid has also been noted.

=== Roots ===
Colonies of the cyanobacterium Nostoc punctiforme occur in apparent symbiosis inside the root tissue, while the rootlets produce root tubercles at ground level which harbour a mycorrhizal fungus of uncertain function, which is however suspected to facilitate the capturing of nitrogen from the air.

== Food value ==
=== Human consumption ===
In several species the pith of the trunk contains a copious amount of high quality starch below the crown. This was formerly cut out by native people as food. Thunberg recorded around 1772 that the Khoekhoe removed the stem's pith at the crown and buried it wrapped in animal skin for about two months, after which they recovered it for kneading into bread, whence the vernacular name "broodboom" (i.e. bread tree). The burial of the pith apparently facilitated its fermentation and softening, and the dough was lightly roasted over a coal fire. In 1779 Paterson likewise found that the pith of a "large palm" near King William's Town was utilised by the Africans and Hottentots as bread. The pith was removed and left till sourish, before it was kneaded into bread.

=== Animal food ===
Their large seeds consist of an often poisonous kernel covered by an edible fleshy layer. Female cones are consequently destroyed by baboons, as they relish the pith around the seeds. Vervet monkeys, rodents and birds also feed on the seeds, but due to their unpredictable toxic qualities they are not recommended for human consumption.

=== Insects ===
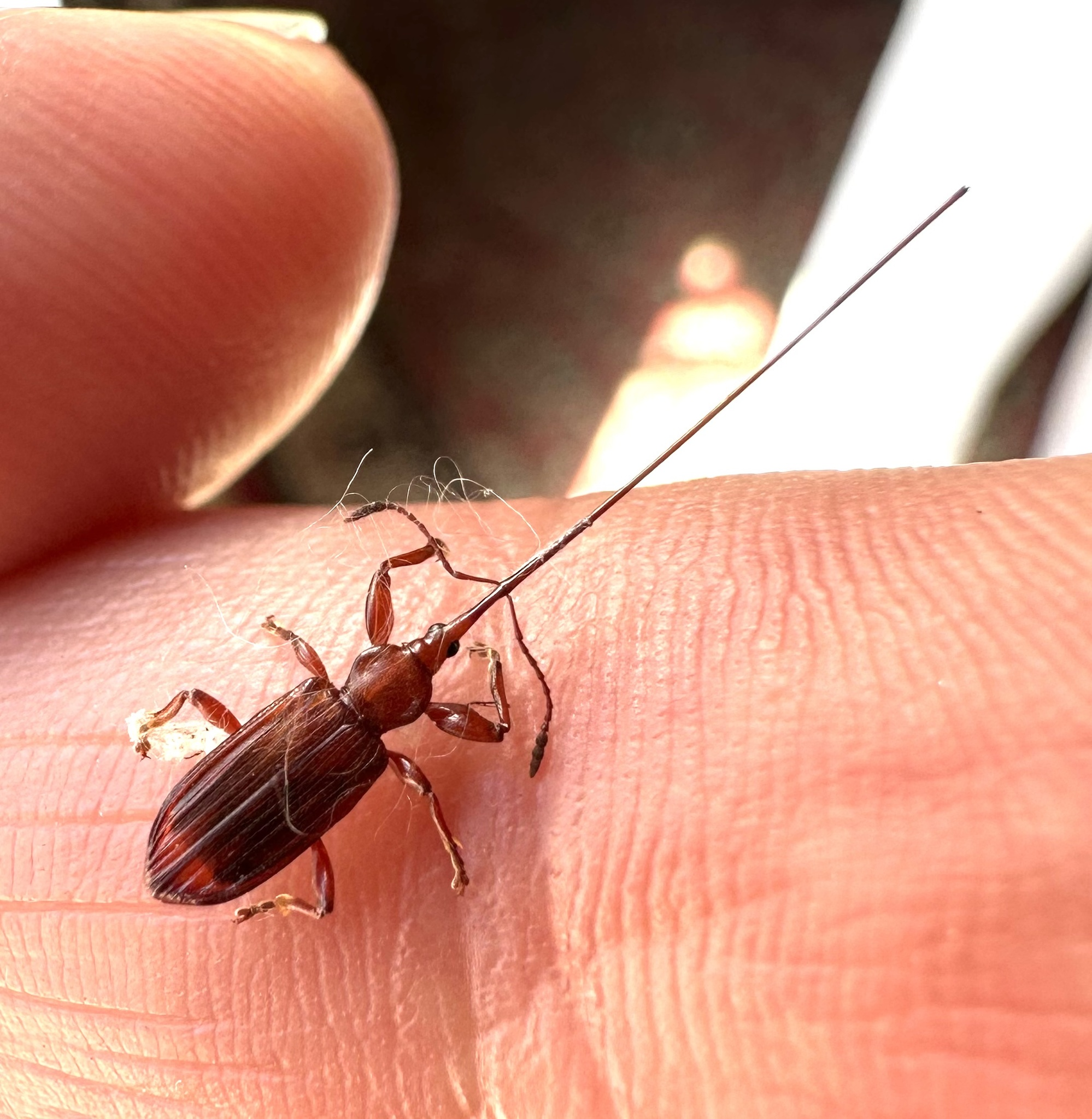
The extremely long-snouted weevil Antliarhis zamiae, which is an important pest of Encephalartos seeds

The early larval instars of some aposematic, day-flying looper moths are specific to cycads, and genus Encephalartos is one of their food plants. They include the leopard magpie (most Encephalartos spp., other cycads, etc.), Millar's tiger (cultivated E. villosus), dimorphic tiger (cycads under forest canopy), spotted tigerlet (E. villosus), inflamed tigerlet (E. villosus), Staude's tigerlet (E. ngoyanus, cultivated E. villosus and Stangeria) and pallid grey (E. natalensis). A notable important pest of Encephalartos seeds in southern Africa are the extremely long-snouted weevil Antliarhis zamiae as well as other species of Antliarhis. In some cases they are responsible for destroying up to 90% of a plant's seeds.

In cultivation various scale insects attack the leaves of the genus. These include cycad aulacaspis scale, zamia scale and latania scale.

== Taxonomy ==
The genus was named by German botanist Johann Georg Christian Lehmann in 1834. All cycads except Cycas had been regarded as members of the genus Zamia until then, and some botanists continued to follow this line for many years after Lehmann had separated Encephalartos as a separate genus. His concept was originally much broader than the one accepted today, including the Australian plants Macrozamia and Lepidozamia.

=== Species ===
Phylogeny of Encephalartos

- - E. gratus Prain (Mulanje cycad)
  - - E. humilis Verd. (Dwarf cycad)
    - - E. concinnus Dyer & Verdoorn (Runde cycad)
      - - E. pterogonus Dyer & Verdoorn (Toothed-cone cycad)
        - - E. relictus Hurter
          - - E. transvenosus Stapf & Burtt Davy (Modjadji's palm)
            - - E. trispinosus (Hooker 1861) Dyer (Bushman's River cycad)
              - - E. marunguensis Devred (Marungu cycad)
                - - E. brevifoliolatus Vorster (Escarpment cycad)
                  - - E. striatus Stapf & Burtt Davy
                    - - E. septentrionalis Schweinfurth ex Eichler (Nile cycad)
                      - - - E. hirsutus Hurter (Venda cycad)
                          - E. kanga Pócs & Luke (Mnanasi pori)
                        - - - E. arenarius Dyer (Alexandria/dune cycad)
                            - E. laurentianus De Wild. (Kwango giant cycad)
                          - - E. paucidentatus Stapf & Burtt Davy (Barberton cycad)
                            - - E. turneri Lavranos & Goode (Turner's cycad)
                              - - E. munchii Dyer & Verdoorn (Munch's cycad)
                                - - E. afer (Thunberg 1775) Lehmann (Eastern Cape dwarf cycad)
                                  - - E. macrostrobilus Scott Jones & Wynants
                                    - - - E. horridus (Von Jacquin) Lehmann (Eastern Cape blue cycad)
                                        - - E. lehmannii Lehmann (Karroo cycad)
                                          - - E. villosus Lemaire (Poor man's cycad)
                                            - - E. msinganus Vorster (Msinga cycad)
                                              - - E. natalensis Dyer & Verdoorn (Natal giant cycad)
                                                - E. woodii Sander (Wood´s cycad)
                                      - - E. longifolius (von Jacquin) Lehmann (Thunberg's cycad, Broodboom)
                                        - - - E. friderici-guilielmi Lehmann (White-haired cycad)
                                            - E. ghellinckii Lemaire (Drakensberg cycad)
                                          - - E. chimanimaniensis Dyer & Verdoorn (Chimanimani cycad)
                                            - - E. sclavoi De Luca, Stevenson & Moretti (Sclavo's cycad)
                                              - - E. equatorialis Hurter
                                                - - E. ituriensis Bamps & Lisowski (Ituri Forest cycad)
                                                  - - - E. dyerianus Lavranos & Goode (Lillie cycad)
                                                      - - E. nubimontanus Hurter (Blue cycad)
                                                        - - E. cupidus Dyer (Blyde River cycad)
                                                          - E. dolomiticus Lavranos & Goode (Wolkberg cycad)
                                                    - - E. eugene-maraisii Verd. (Waterberg cycad, Bergpalm)
                                                      - - E. tegulaneus Melville (Kenyan giant cycad)
                                                        - - E. delucanus Malaisse, Sclavo & Crosiers
                                                          - - - E. hildebrandtii Braun & Bouché (Mombasa cycad)
                                                              - E. schmitzii Malaisse (Schmitz's cycad)
                                                            - - E. kisambo Faden & Beentje (Voi cycad)
                                                              - - E. whitelockii Hurter (Uganda giant cycad)
                                                                - - - E. barteri Carruthers ex Miquel (West African cycad)
                                                                    - - E. cycadifolius (von Jacquin 1803) Lehmann (Winterberg cycad)
                                                                      - - E. inopinus Dyer (Lydenburg cycad)
                                                                        - - E. laevifolius Stapf & Burtt Davy (Kaapsehoop cycad)
                                                                          - E. lanatus Stapf & Burtt Davy (Olifants River cycad)
                                                                  - - - E. latifrons Lehmann (Albany cycad)
                                                                      - E. manikensis (Gilliland 1938) Gilliland (Gorongowe cycad)
                                                                    - - - E. altensteinii Lehmann (Eastern Cape cycad)
                                                                        - - E. middelburgensis Vorster, Robbertse & S.van der Westh. (Middelburg cycad)
                                                                          - - E. aemulans Vorster (Ngotshe cycad)
                                                                            - E. princeps Dyer (Kei cycad)
                                                                      - - E. bubalinus Melville (Lake Natron cycad)
                                                                        - - E. ferox Bertoloni (Maputaland cycad)
                                                                          - - E. umbeluziensis Dyer (Umbeluzi cycad)
                                                                            - - E. senticosus Vorster (Jozini cycad)
                                                                              - - E. ngoyanus Verd. (Ngoye cycad)
                                                                                - - E. heenanii Dyer (Woolly cycad)
                                                                                  - - E. cerinus Lavranos & Goode (Waxen cycad)
                                                                                    - - E. poggei Ascherson (Kananga cycad)
                                                                                      - - E. aplanatus Vorster (Vorster's cycad)
                                                                                        - E. lebomboensis Verd. (Lebombo cycad)

Image	Leaves	Scientific name	Distribution
		Encephalartos aemulans	KwaZulu-Natal Province in South Africa
		Encephalartos afer	Eastern Cape Province of South Africa
		Encephalartos altensteinii	Eastern Cape and south-western KwaZulu-Natal Provinces of South Africa
		Encephalartos aplanatus	north-eastern Eswatini, South Africa
		Encephalartos arenarius	Eastern Cape Province, South Africa
		Encephalartos barteri	central Nigeria (near Tokkos, Plateau State), Nigeria (between Jebba and Ilorin), Benin (Borgou Department and near Savalou), Ghana (Volta River watershed), Togo
		Encephalartos brevifoliolatus	Transvaal, South Africa
		Encephalartos bubalinus	northern Tanzania and southern Kenya
		Encephalartos cerinus	Buffelsrivier Valley of KwaZulu-Natal, South Africa.
		Encephalartos chimanimaniensis	Chimanimani Mountains of eastern Zimbabwe
		Encephalartos concinnus	Zimbabwe (Gwanda, Matabeleland South; Mberengwa, Midlands; Runde, Masvingo)
		Encephalartos cupidus	Limpopo Province, South Africa
		Encephalartos cycadifolius	Winterberg Mountains, Eastern Cape Province, South Africa
		Encephalartos delucanus	Rukwa Region of western Tanzania
		Encephalartos dolomiticus	Wolkberg, southeastern Limpopo Province, South Africa
		Encephalartos dyerianus	northern Transvaal area, South Africa
		Encephalartos equatorialis	Thurston Bay, Lake Victoria, Uganda
		Encephalartos eugene-maraisii	Limpopo Province, South Africa
		Encephalartos ferox	south-eastern coast of Africa
		Encephalartos friderici-guilielmi	Eastern Cape and KwaZulu-Natal Provinces of South Africa
		Encephalartos ghellinckii	KwaZulu-Natal and northern Transkei, South Africa
		Encephalartos gratus	Malawi (Mulanje District) and Mozambique (Zambezia Province, Chiraba River and Navene River area, Mount Namuli, near Derre, Morrumbala, and Namarroi)
		Encephalartos heenanii	north of Eswatini and Mpumalanga Province in South Africa
		Encephalartos hildebrandtii	Kenya and Tanzania
		Encephalartos hirsutus	Limpopo Province, South Africa
		Encephalartos horridus	Eastern Cape Province, South Africa
		Encephalartos humilis	Mpumalanga, South Africa
		Encephalartos inopinus	Limpopo Province, South Africa
		Encephalartos ituriensis	Ituri forest area in the Democratic Republic of the Congo
		Encephalartos kisambo	Kenya and Tanzania
		Encephalartos laevifolius	KwaZulu-Natal, Limpopo and Mpumalanga Provinces of South Africa
		Encephalartos lanatus	Mpumalanga Province, South Africa.
		Encephalartos latifrons	Eastern Cape Province, South Africa
		Encephalartos laurentianus	northern Angola and southern Congo (Zaire)
		Encephalartos lebomboensis	Lebombo Mountains of South Africa
		Encephalartos lehmannii	Eastern Cape Province, South Africa
		Encephalartos longifolius	Eastern Cape Province, South Africa
		Encephalartos mackenziei	Didinga Hills of Namorunyang State, South Sudan
		Encephalartos macrostrobilus	Moyo District, northwestern Uganda
		Encephalartos manikensis	Mozambique and Zimbabwe
		Encephalartos marunguensis	Democratic Republic of the Congo (in the Marungu Mountains and on Muhila plateau) and Tanzania (about 100 km west of Marungu)
		Encephalartos middelburgensis	Gauteng and Mpumalanga Provinces of South Africa
		Encephalartos msinganus	KwaZulu-Natal Province, South Africa
		Encephalartos munchii	central Mozambique
		Encephalartos natalensis	Qumbu and Tabankulu areas of the northern part of the Eastern Cape, and through most of KwaZulu-Natal, South Africa
		Encephalartos ngoyanus	Ngoye Forest, in KwaZulu-Natal, South Africa
		Encephalartos nubimontanus	Limpopo Province, South Africa
		Encephalartos paucidentatus	near Barberton in Mpumalanga Province, and near Piggs Peak in northwestern Eswatini, in South Africa
		Encephalartos poggei	DRC (Kasai Occidental, Shaba Province), Angola (Lunda Sul Province)
		Encephalartos princeps	Eastern Cape Province of South Africa
		Encephalartos pterogonus	Manica Province of Mozambique
		Encephalartos relictus	Eswatini, South Africa
		Encephalartos schaijesii	near Kolwezi in Shaba Province, Democratic Republic of the Congo
		Encephalartos schmitzii	Luapula River watershed, in Democratic Republic of the Congo (on the extreme south of the Kundelungu plateau, Shaba Province) and in Zambia (along the Muchinga escarpment in Luapula and Northern provinces). A subpopulation is also found in North-Western Province, Zambia, to the east of Solwezi
		Encephalartos sclavoi	Tanzania
		Encephalartos senticosus	Lebombo Mountains of Mozambique, Eswatini and KwaZulu-Natal Province of South Africa.
		Encephalartos septentrionalis	South Sudan, northern Uganda, northern Democratic Republic of the Congo
		Encephalartos tegulaneus	Eastern Province near Embu and on the Matthews Range in Rift Valley Province, Kenya
		Encephalartos transvenosus	Limpopo Province, South Africa
		Encephalartos trispinosus	Eastern Cape Province, South Africa
		Encephalartos turneri	Nampula, Mazambique.
		Encephalartos umbeluziensis	Mozambique and Eswatini
		Encephalartos villosus	East London vicinity and Eswatini, South Africa
		Encephalartos whitelockii	Uganda (Kabarole District)
		Encephalartos woodii	KwaZulu-Natal Province, South Africa

== See also ==
- List of Southern African indigenous trees
