= Encephalartos relictus =

Conservation status
- Extinct in the Wild (IUCN 3.1)
- CITES Appendix I (CITES)

Scientific classification
- Kingdom: Plantae
- Clade: Tracheophytes
- Clade: Gymnospermae
- Division: Cycadophyta
- Class: Cycadopsida
- Order: Cycadales
- Family: Zamiaceae
- Genus: Encephalartos
- Species: E. relictus

Binomial name
- Encephalartos relictus P.J.H.Hurter

Species of cycad

Encephalartos relictus, also known as the Parlota cycad, is a species of cycad in Eswatini. The cycad is evolutionarily extinct; the cycad has only male plants, meaning that they cannot produce seeds. However, J. J. P. du Preez was able to propagate some offshoots of the specimens.

== Description ==
It is a cycad with an arborescent habit, with a stem up to 2.5 m tall and 40–45 cm in diameter, with secondary stems originating from basal suckers. The leaves, pinnate, of a bluish-green color, are 1–2 m long, supported by a petiole about 15 cm long, and composed of numerous pairs of lanceolate, coriaceous leaflets, arranged on the rachis with an angle of about 40°, long up to 20–25 cm, with entire margin and a pungent. It is a dioecious species, of which, however, only male specimens are known which have from 1 to 3 sub-conical cones, about 20–24 cm long and 12–15 cm broad, of greenish-yellow sarcotesta.
