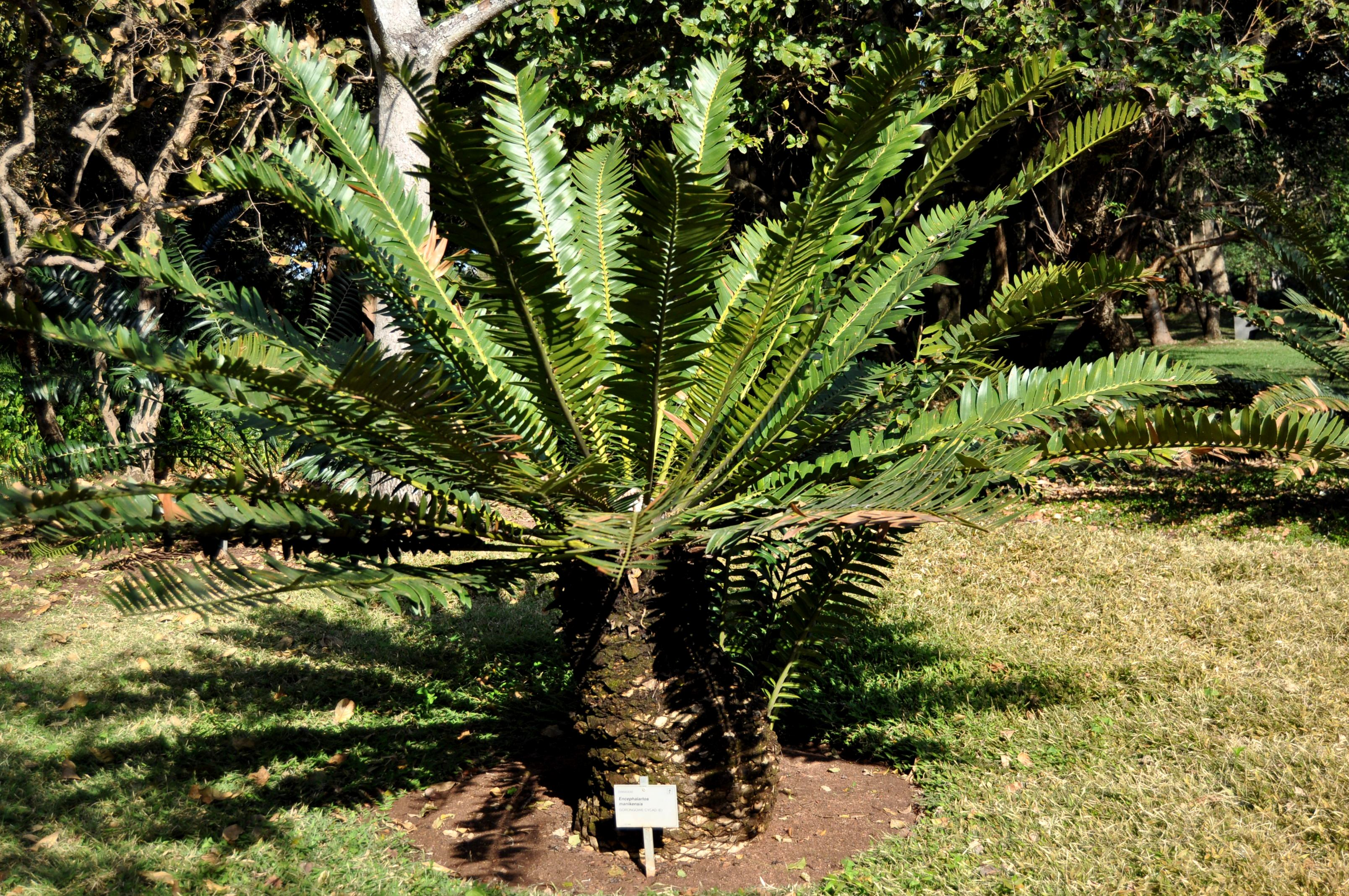

Conservation status
- Vulnerable (IUCN 3.1)
- CITES Appendix I (CITES)

Scientific classification
- Kingdom: Plantae
- Clade: Tracheophytes
- Clade: Gymnospermae
- Division: Cycadophyta
- Class: Cycadopsida
- Order: Cycadales
- Family: Zamiaceae
- Genus: Encephalartos
- Species: E. manikensis

Binomial name
- Encephalartos manikensis Gilliland 1939

= Encephalartos manikensis =

Species of cycad

Encephalartos manikensis (Gorongo Cycad, Gorongowe Cycad) is a species of cycad that is native to Mozambique and Zimbabwe.

== Description ==
This cycad has a tree-like structure, growing up to 1.5 m tall, sometimes with additional stems growing from its base. Its feather-like leaves, forming a crown at the top of the stem, are 1–2 m long, supported by a 5–6 cm long petiole, and consist of around 60 pairs of lance-shaped leaflets. These leaflets may have 1-2 spines on both their upper and lower edges, and they are attached to the stem at a 180° angle, tapering to thorns near the petiole. This species is dioecious, meaning it has separate male and female plants. Male plants produce 1-4 erect, cylindrical-ovoid cones that are 25–65 cm long and 15–22 cm wide, light green in color. Female plants bear 1-2 ovoid cones that are 30–45 cm long and 20–25 cm wide. The seeds are roughly ovoid, 3–5 cm long, and have a bright red sarcotesta.

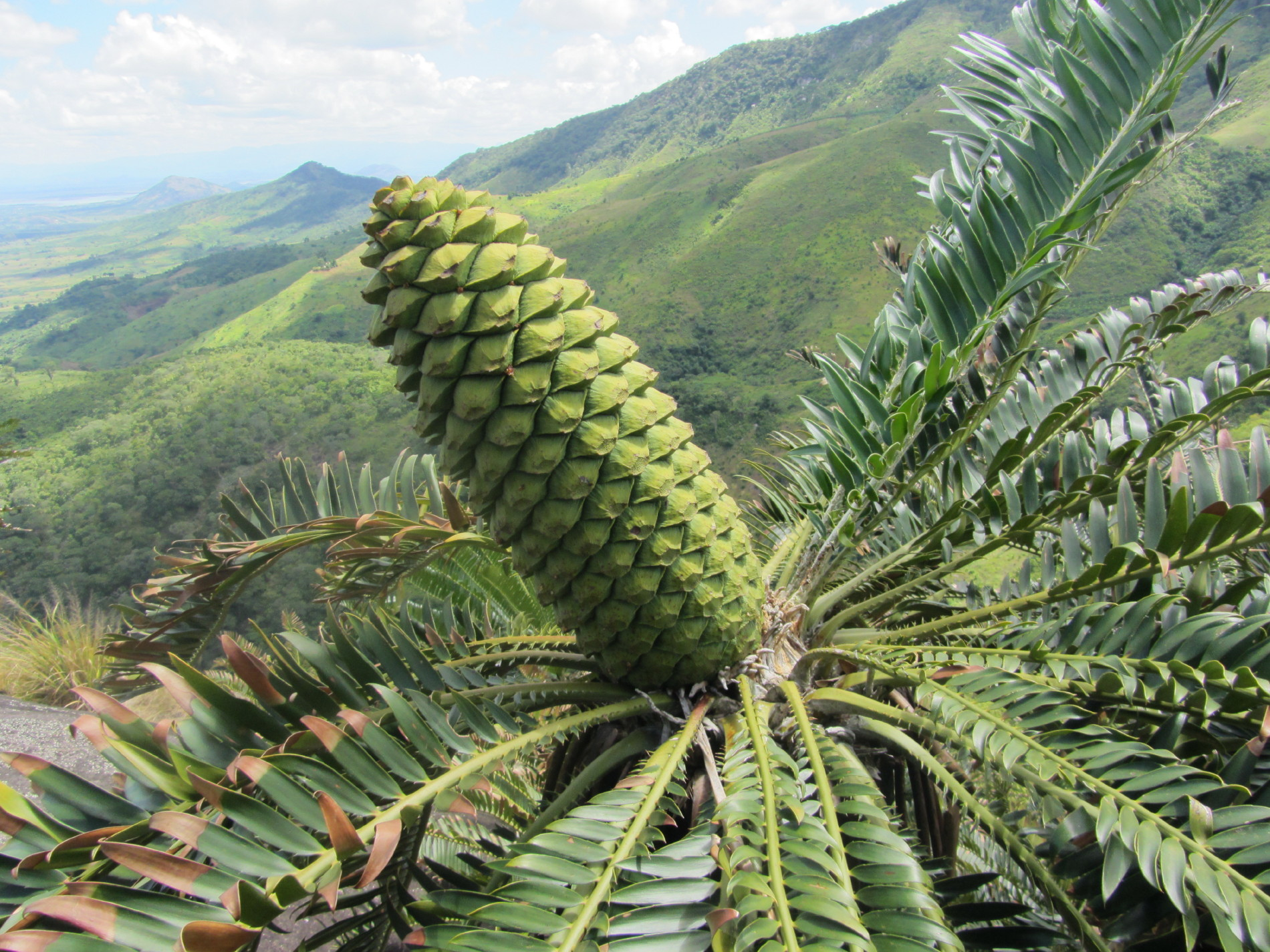
Cone

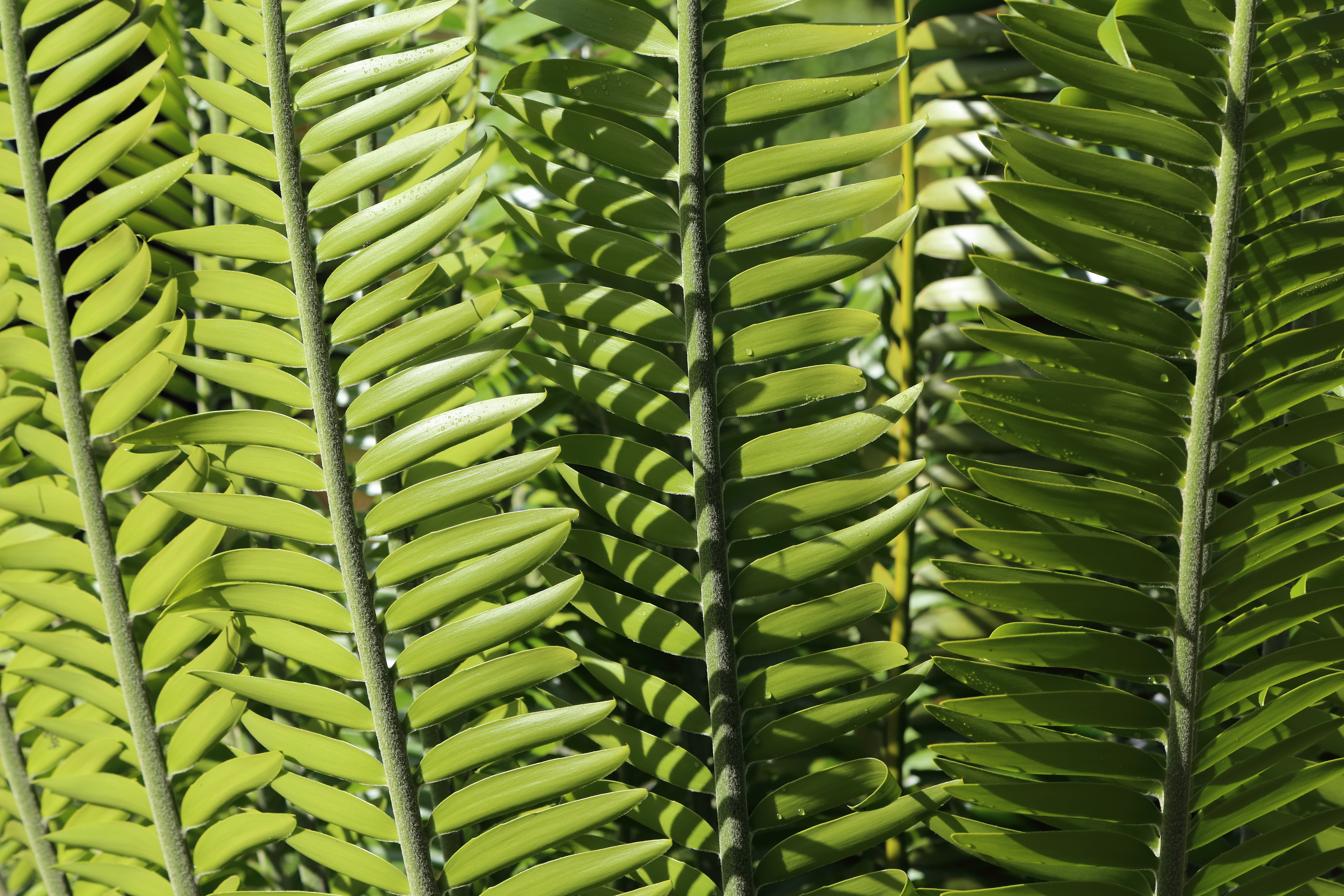
Leaves
