= Encephalartos mackenziei =

Conservation status
- Near Threatened (IUCN 3.1)
- CITES Appendix I (CITES)

Scientific classification
- Kingdom: Plantae
- Clade: Tracheophytes
- Clade: Gymnospermae
- Division: Cycadophyta
- Class: Cycadopsida
- Order: Cycadales
- Family: Zamiaceae
- Genus: Encephalartos
- Species: E. mackenziei

Binomial name
- Encephalartos mackenziei L.E.Newton

Species of cycad

Encephalartos mackenziei is a species of cycad in South Sudan. It is found in the Didinga Hills of Namorunyang State.

== Description ==
This cycad grows up to 3.5 m tall with a stem diameter of 35 cm. It starts upright but then bends over, producing many secondary stems from basal shoots. The pinnate leaves form a crown at the top of the stem, reaching up to 1.5 m long. Each leaf has several pairs of oval-shaped, leathery, and hairy leaflets, 15–17 cm long, with 3-5 spines on the upper edge and a sharp tip. They attach to the stem at a 45° angle. This species is dioecious, with male plants bearing up to 10 long, slender cones, about 22 cm long and 9 cm wide, initially light green and turning yellow when ripe. Female plants have 1-2 large, egg-shaped cones, about 40 cm long and 16-18 cm wide, initially light green and changing to olive-brown when ripe. The seeds are roughly egg-shaped, 3.5 cm long, and have an orange-red sarcotesta.
