= Encephalartos munchii =

Conservation status
- Endangered (IUCN 3.1)
- CITES Appendix I (CITES)

Scientific classification
- Kingdom: Plantae
- Clade: Tracheophytes
- Clade: Gymnospermae
- Division: Cycadophyta
- Class: Cycadopsida
- Order: Cycadales
- Family: Zamiaceae
- Genus: Encephalartos
- Species: E. munchii

Binomial name
- Encephalartos munchii R.A.Dyer & Verdoorn

Species of cycad

Encephalartos munchii is a perennial species of cycad in Africa. In English, the species goes by the common name Munch's cycad.

== Description ==
This cycad is tree-like, dioecious, growing up to 1 meter tall and 30 centimeters wide, often with additional stems sprouting from its base. Its pinnate leaves, located in a cluster at the top of the stem, are 1–1.3 meters long, supported by a 15-20 centimeter petiole, and made up of many pairs of lance-shaped, leathery green leaves, each about 15–20 centimeters long, with a spiny edge and a sharp tip. This species has separate male and female plants. Male plants have 1 to 6 upright, slightly cylindrical cones, 40–65 centimeters long and 7–9 centimeters wide, in a jade green color. Female plants have solitary cylindrical to oval cones, 30–50 centimeters long and 16–20 centimeters wide, ranging in color from glaucous green to jade green. The seeds are roughly oval, 2.5-3.5 centimeters long, and covered with a bright red sarcotesta.
