= Encephalartos marunguensis =

Conservation status
- Vulnerable (IUCN 3.1)
- CITES Appendix I (CITES)

Scientific classification
- Kingdom: Plantae
- Clade: Tracheophytes
- Clade: Gymnospermae
- Division: Cycadophyta
- Class: Cycadopsida
- Order: Cycadales
- Family: Zamiaceae
- Genus: Encephalartos
- Species: E. marunguensis

Binomial name
- Encephalartos marunguensis Devred

Species of cycad

Encephalartos marunguensis, the Marungu cycad, is a species of cycad in Africa.

It is found in the Democratic Republic of the Congo (in the Marungu Mountains and on Muhila plateau) and Tanzania (about 100 km west of Marungu) in the southeast of the country.

== Description ==
This plant is stemless, growing up to 40 cm high and 15 cm wide underground. Its bluish-green leaves, 50-80 cm long, have a strong central ridge and are arranged oppositely on the stem. The upper part of the stem is curved, and the leaves often reduce to spines near the base. This species is dioecious, with bluish-green male cones (18-25 cm long, 5-7.5 cm wide) and similar female cones (20-30 cm long, 10-15 cm wide), usually produced in small numbers. The oblong seeds (20-30 mm long) have a red or yellow sarcotesta.
