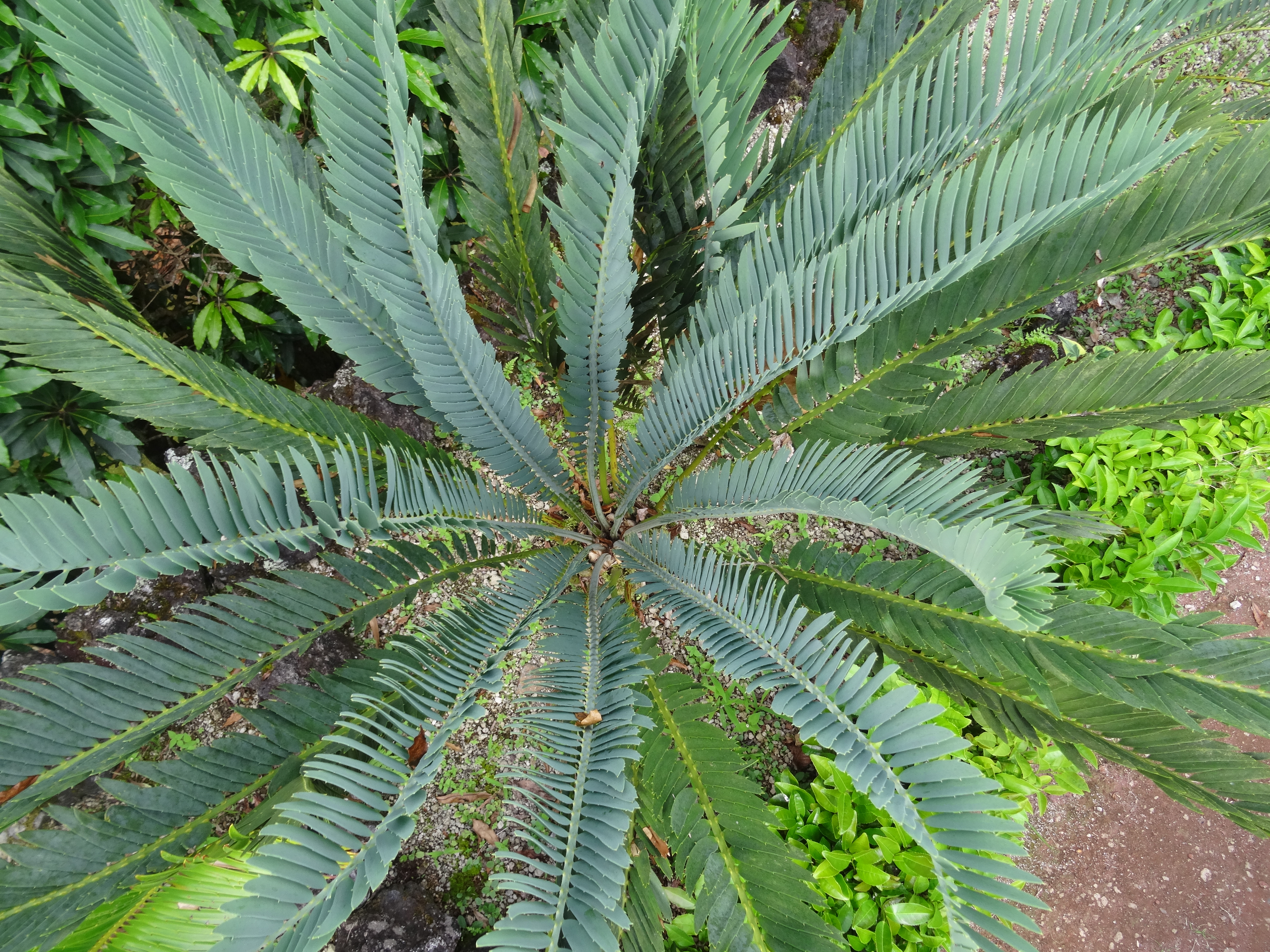

Conservation status
- Extinct in the Wild (IUCN 3.1)
- CITES Appendix I (CITES)

Scientific classification
- Kingdom: Plantae
- Clade: Tracheophytes
- Clade: Gymnospermae
- Division: Cycadophyta
- Class: Cycadopsida
- Order: Cycadales
- Family: Zamiaceae
- Genus: Encephalartos
- Species: E. nubimontanus

Binomial name
- Encephalartos nubimontanus P.J.H.Hurter
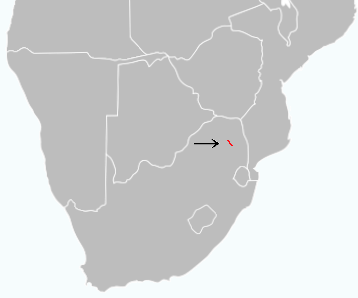
- native range

= Encephalartos nubimontanus =

Species of cycad

Encephalartos nubimontanus is a species of cycad which is native to Limpopo, South Africa.

== Description ==
This cycad has a tree-like growth pattern, with a tall, upright or leaning stem reaching up to 2.5 meters in height and 35-40 centimeters in diameter. It may also have additional stems growing from its base. The leaves are arranged in a circular cluster at the top of the stem and are 1-2 meters long, supported by a 23-centimeter stem with a distinctive reddish ring at its base. Each leaf is made up of numerous pairs of lance-shaped, tough leaflets, up to 25 centimeters long, with serrated edges and a sharp tip, positioned at a 70-degree angle along the leaf's central axis.

This species is dioecious, meaning individual plants are either male or female. Male plants bear 1 to 5 cone-shaped structures on stalks, each 25-40 centimeters long and 5-9 centimeters wide. Female plants produce 1-3 oval-shaped cones, each 35-40 centimeters long and 18-20 centimeters wide, with a light green color. The seeds are roughly oval-shaped, measuring 3.5-3.8 centimeters in length and covered in an orange-red outer layer called a sarcotesta.
