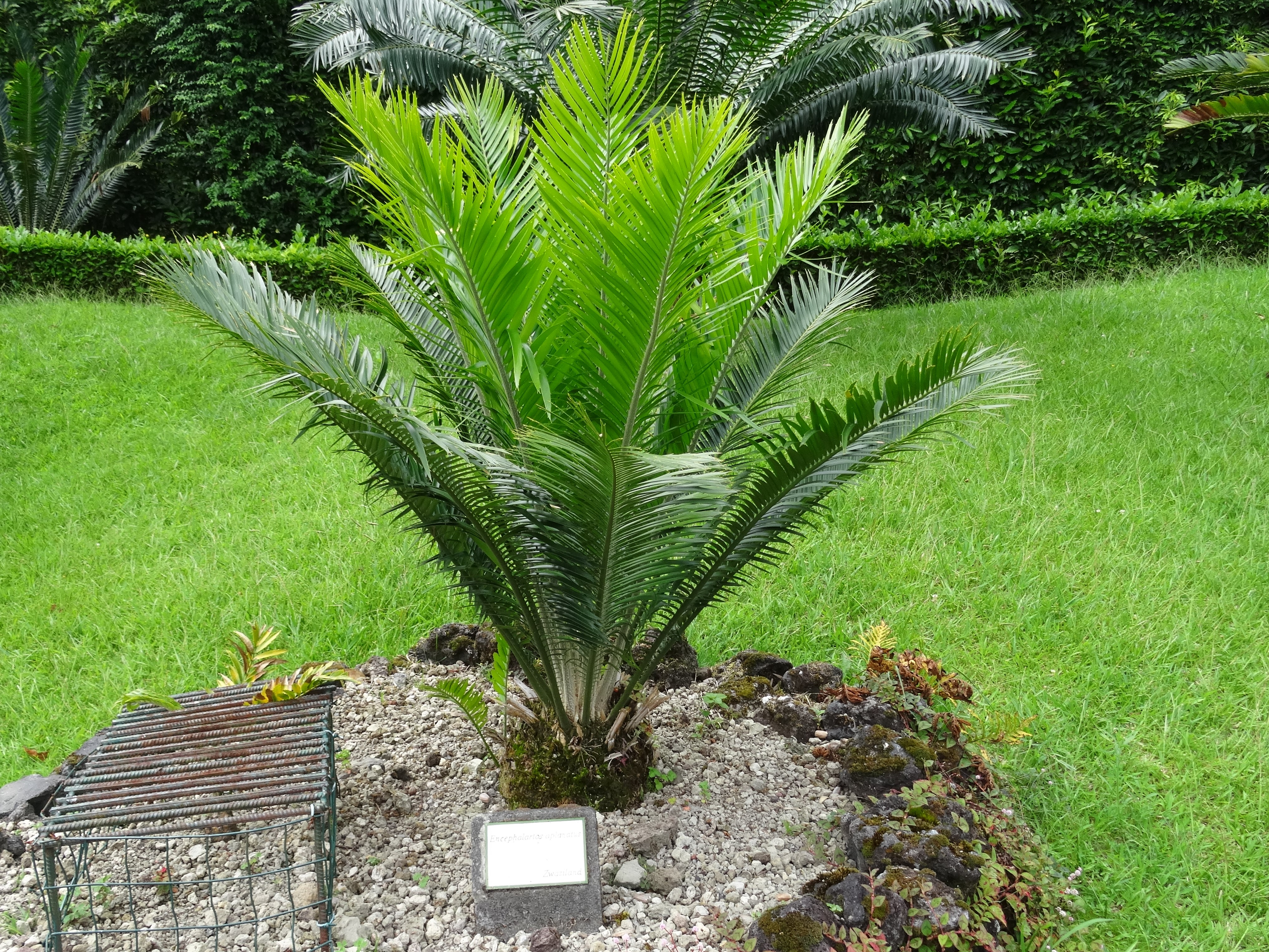

Conservation status
- Vulnerable (IUCN 3.1)
- CITES Appendix I (CITES)

Scientific classification
- Kingdom: Plantae
- Clade: Tracheophytes
- Clade: Gymnospermae
- Division: Cycadophyta
- Class: Cycadopsida
- Order: Cycadales
- Family: Zamiaceae
- Genus: Encephalartos
- Species: E. aplanatus

Binomial name
- Encephalartos aplanatus Vorster

= Encephalartos aplanatus =

Species of cycad

Encephalartos aplanatus is a species of cycad in Eswatini.

== Description ==
This cycad is short, with 2-8 dark green leaves that grow up to 350 cm long. When young, the leaves stand upright, but as they mature, they tend to lie flat. The leaflets are lanceolate, about 30 cm long, with toothed margins, and grow in an opposite pattern along the rachis at an angle of 150-180°. The petiole has small spines.

It is a dioecious plant, with yellow, spindle-shaped male cones that are about 60 cm long and 8–10 cm wide. Female cones are also yellow, ovoid, around 40 cm long, and 12 cm in diameter. Both types of cones appear in January, during the middle of summer in the northern hemisphere. The surfaces of both macrosporophylls and microsporophylls are flat, smooth, and glabrous.

The seeds are 25 mm long and covered with red sarcotesta.
