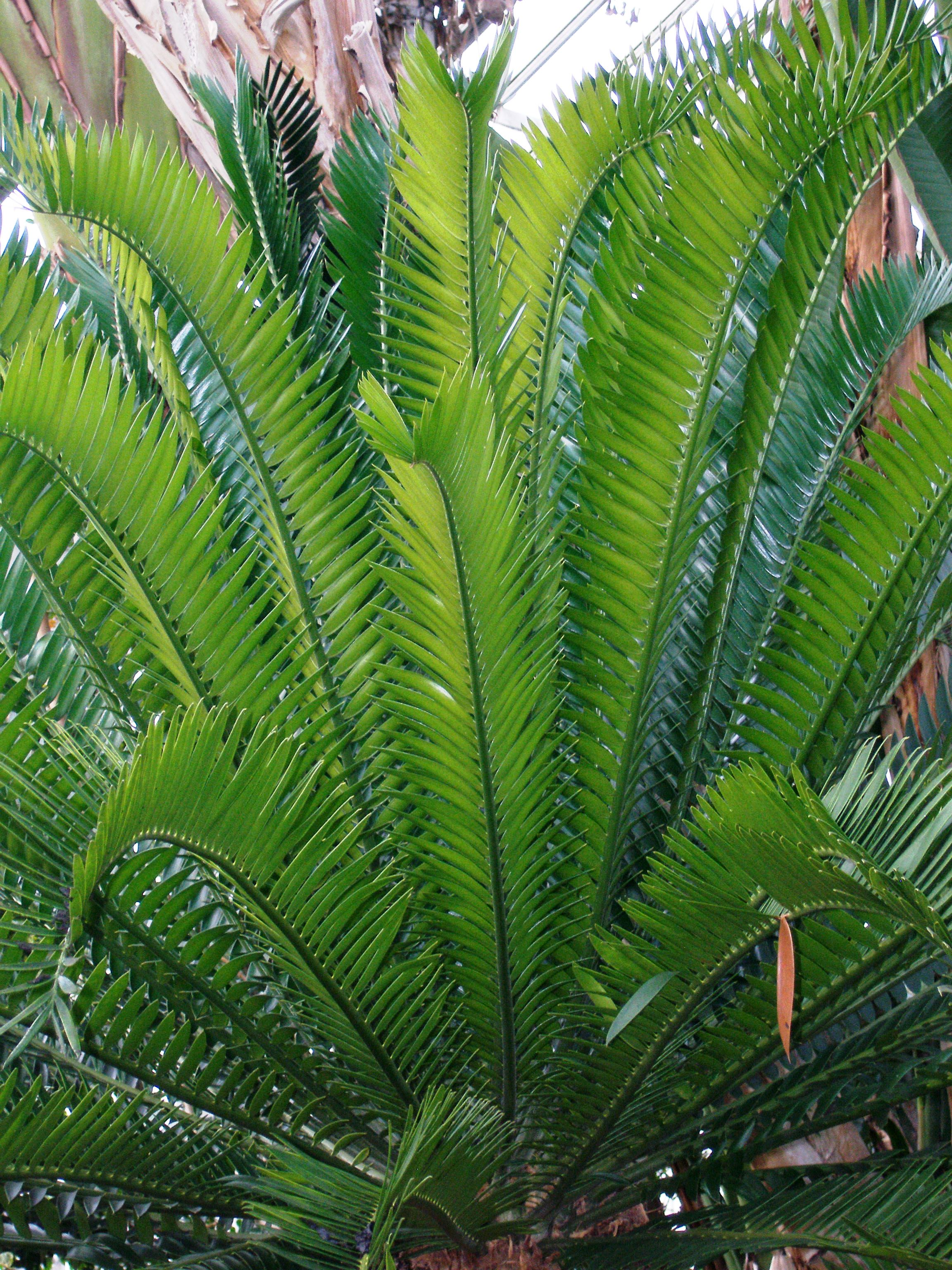

Conservation status
- Near Threatened (IUCN 3.1)
- CITES Appendix I

Scientific classification
- Kingdom: Plantae
- Clade: Tracheophytes
- Clade: Gymnospermae
- Division: Cycadophyta
- Class: Cycadopsida
- Order: Cycadales
- Family: Zamiaceae
- Genus: Encephalartos
- Species: E. bubalinus

Binomial name
- Encephalartos bubalinus Melville

= Encephalartos bubalinus =

Species of cycad

Encephalartos bubalinus is a species of cycad in Kenya and Tanzania.

== Description ==
Encephalartos bubalinus has an upright or sometimes reclining stem, reaching 35–45 cm in diameter and up to 2 meters in height as it matures. Its pinnate leaves, forming a crown at the top of the stem, are 60 to 160 cm long and consist of 50-90 pairs of tough leaflets arranged alternately along the midrib at a 45° angle, becoming spiny near the base. This dioecious species produces male cones measuring 27.5–55 cm in length and 13–5 cm in diameter, as well as female cones that are 32-45 cm long and 20–25 cm wide, both greenish in color. The seeds, roughly ovoid and 30–40 mm long, are enveloped in a red-orange sarcotesta.
