= Encephalartos delucanus =

Conservation status
- Endangered (IUCN 3.1)
- CITES Appendix I (CITES)

Scientific classification
- Kingdom: Plantae
- Clade: Tracheophytes
- Clade: Gymnospermae
- Division: Cycadophyta
- Class: Cycadopsida
- Order: Cycadales
- Family: Zamiaceae
- Genus: Encephalartos
- Species: E. delucanus

Binomial name
- Encephalartos delucanus Malaisse, Sclavo & Crosiers

Species of cycad

Encephalartos delucanus is a species of cycad in Africa.

== Description ==
It is an acaule plant, with a stem 12 cm high and 10–20 cm in diameter, covered with densely tomentose cataphyllans. The leaves are 50–65 cm long and are composed of 25-35 pairs of leathery leaflets arranged on the spine alternately, reduced to thorns towards the base of the petiole, tomentose on the dorsal side and glabrous on the ventral side. It is a dioecious species, of which only male specimens have been described. They possess 1 or rarely 2 cylindrical cones, 10–20 cm long and 2–3 cm broad, green in color.

== Habitat ==
It is found only in the Rukwa Region of western Tanzania. Populations are found in:

- Mpanda area
- near Mount Kasima
- Mount Sitebi
- Lugala Hills
