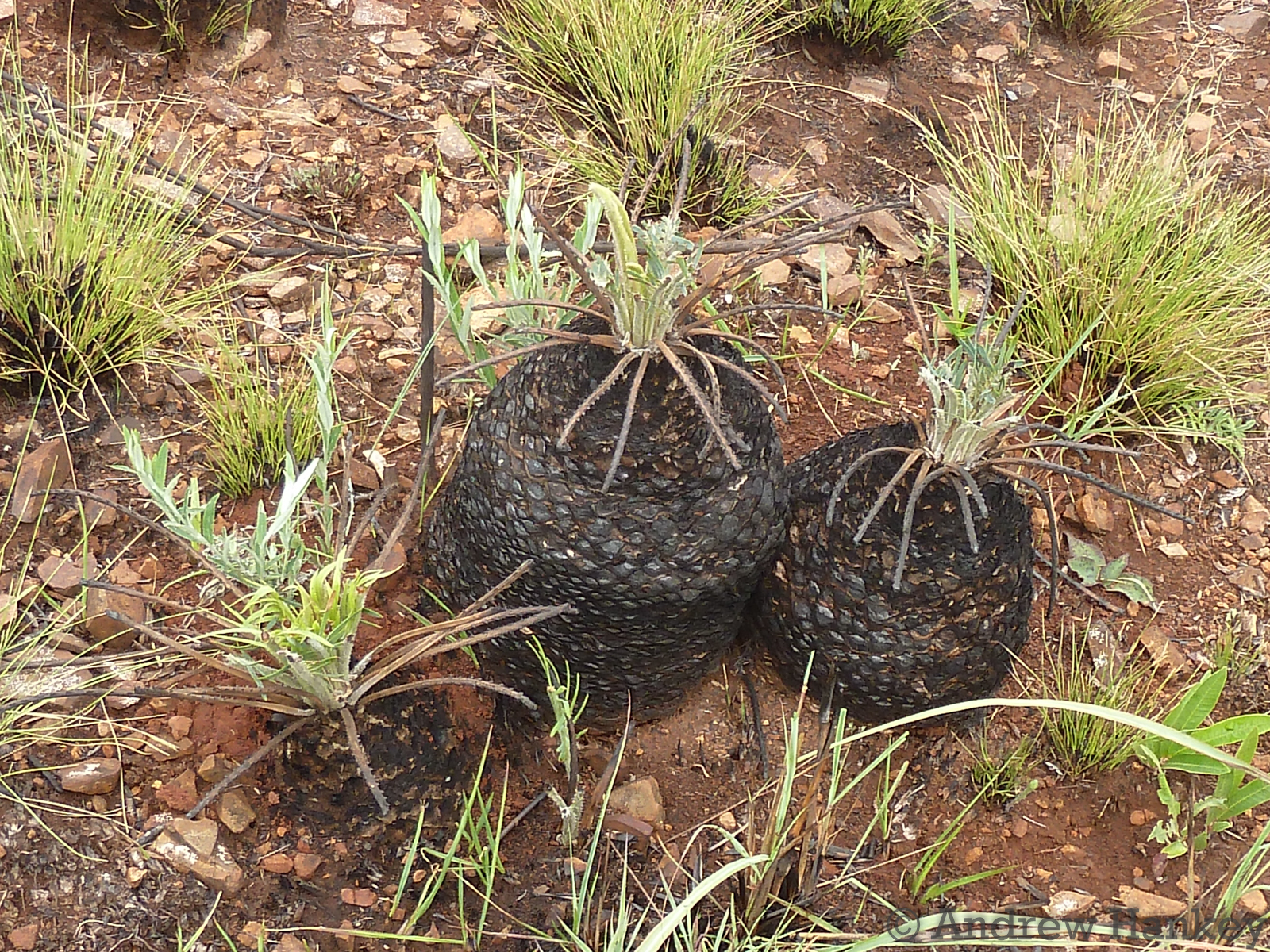

Conservation status
- Vulnerable (IUCN 3.1)
- CITES Appendix I (CITES)

Scientific classification
- Kingdom: Plantae
- Clade: Tracheophytes
- Clade: Gymnospermae
- Division: Cycadophyta
- Class: Cycadopsida
- Order: Cycadales
- Family: Zamiaceae
- Genus: Encephalartos
- Species: E. humilis

Binomial name
- Encephalartos humilis I.Verd.

= Encephalartos humilis =

Species of cycad

Encephalartos humilis is a species of cycad in the former Transvaal Province, South Africa.

== Description ==
This cycad is small, with an underground stem that doesn't grow taller than 50 cm and has a diameter of 15-20 cm. It sometimes develops secondary stems from basal shoots. The pinnate leaves, numbering 5 to 8, form a crown at the top of the stem. They are 30–50 cm long, with a petiole around 10 cm long, and made up of many pairs of lanceolate, leathery leaflets up to 13 cm long. These leaflets have a smooth edge and about 9 parallel veins on their lower surface, connected to a greenish-yellow rachis. This species is dioecious, with male plants bearing spindle-shaped cones that are 15–20 cm long and 4–5 cm wide, brownish-gray in color. Female plants have a roughly cylindrical, solitary cone about 25 cm long and 8–10 cm wide, also brownish-gray. The seeds are approximately ovoid and 2.5-3.5 cm long, covered in light yellow to orange flesh.
