= Encephalartos schaijesii =

Conservation status
- Vulnerable (IUCN 3.1)
- CITES Appendix I (CITES)

Scientific classification
- Kingdom: Plantae
- Clade: Tracheophytes
- Clade: Gymnospermae
- Division: Cycadophyta
- Class: Cycadopsida
- Order: Cycadales
- Family: Zamiaceae
- Genus: Encephalartos
- Species: E. schaijesii

Binomial name
- Encephalartos schaijesii Malaisse, Sclavo & Crosiers 1993

Species of cycad

Encephalartos schaijesii is a species of cycad endemic to the Democratic Republic of the Congo. It is only found near Kolwezi in Shaba Province, Democratic Republic of the Congo. It occurs in Miombo woodlands.

== Description ==
This cycad has an underground stem, up to 25 cm high and 20-30 cm in diameter, often with secondary stems from shoots at its base. Its pinnate leaves are erect, 80–120 cm long, and form a crown atop the stem, supported by 2 cm long petioles. Each leaf has 48-58 pairs of lanceolate leaflets with spiny green glaucous margins, angled at 70-75° on the rachis. It is dioecious, with male specimens bearing a single 15–17 cm long, 4–4.5 cm wide, greenish-yellow cone, and female specimens with a single 29–32 cm long, 12–15 cm wide cylindrical-ovoid cone, gray to greenish in color.
