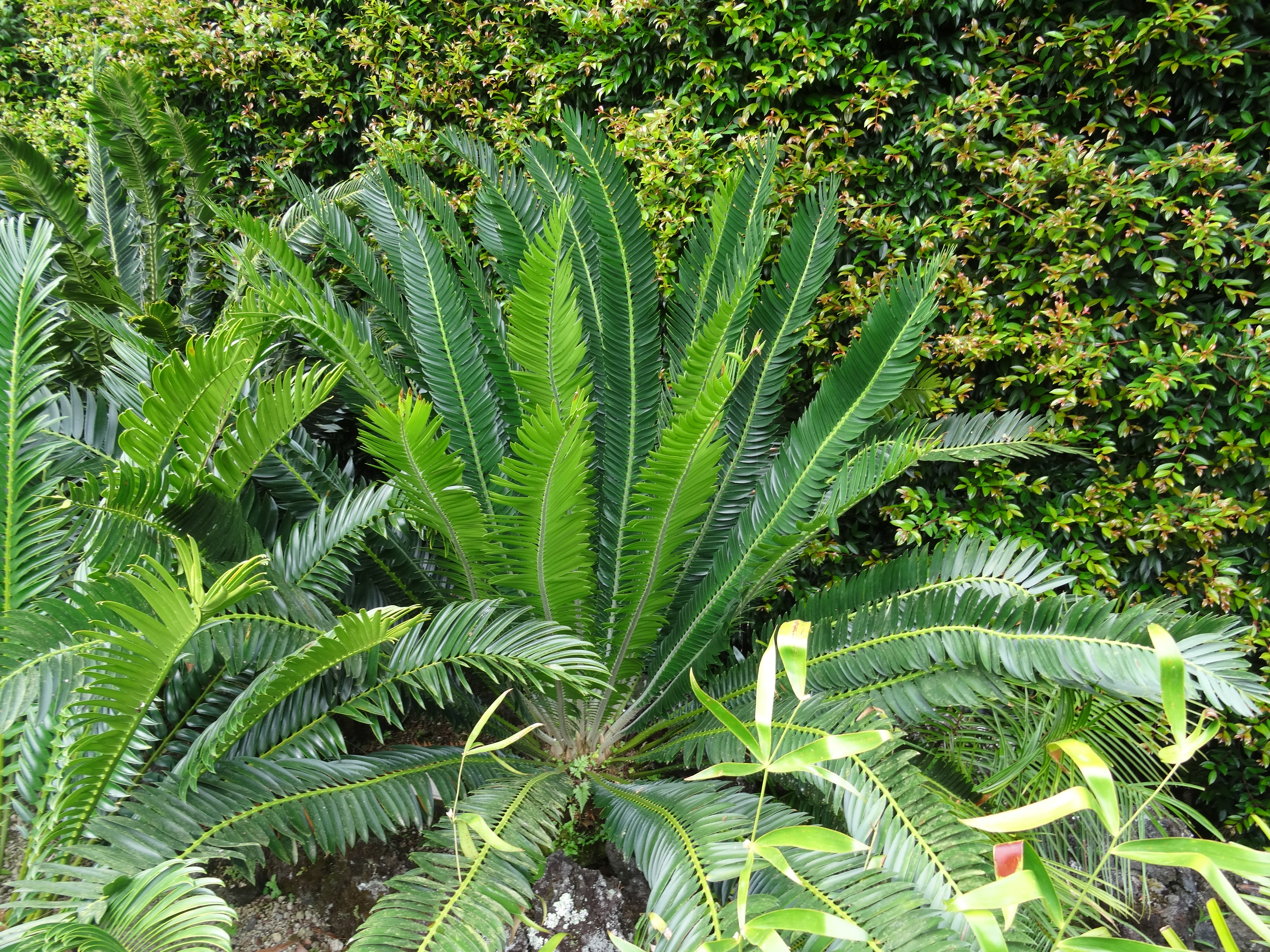

Conservation status
- Endangered (IUCN 3.1)
- CITES Appendix I (CITES)

Scientific classification
- Kingdom: Plantae
- Clade: Tracheophytes
- Clade: Gymnospermae
- Division: Cycadophyta
- Class: Cycadopsida
- Order: Cycadales
- Family: Zamiaceae
- Genus: Encephalartos
- Species: E. chimanimaniensis

Binomial name
- Encephalartos chimanimaniensis R.A. Dyer & I. Verd.

= Encephalartos chimanimaniensis =

Chimanimani cycad

Species of cycad

The Chimanimani cycad (Encephalartos chimanimaniensis) is a species of cycad that is endemic to the Chimanimani Mountains of eastern Zimbabwe. It is a threatened species which has been locally extirpated by cycad collectors.

== Description ==
These plants have an upright, unbranched stem, sometimes with additional stems growing from the base, reaching up to 1.8 meters in height and 45 cm in diameter.

The leaves are feather-like, 100–150 cm long, made up of narrow leaflets with small spines along the edges, each leaflet being 12–18 cm long and arranged at an angle of 45-80° on the stem.

This species is dioecious, meaning it has separate male and female plants. The male cones are oval-shaped, green, 1-3 in number, and sit directly on the plant, measuring 50–70 cm in length and 8–10 cm in diameter, with large, diamond-shaped parts containing pollen. Female cones, found singly, are yellow-green, 35–40 cm long, and 20–23 cm wide, with bumpy surfaces on the parts containing seeds.

The seeds are oblong, measuring 20–30 mm in length and 15–20 mm in width, covered with a red fleshy sarcotesta.

== Status ==
According to an assessment in 2003, between 500 and 1,000 plants remained in the wild. Capela (2006) however provided an estimate of 1,200 mature plants at Makurupini and an additional 300 at Morambo, besides smaller isolated colonies.

== Habitat ==
It is found in mountain grassland in areas of high rainfall (over 1,800 mm per annum), and at an altitude of about 1,000 metres above sea level. It is associated with schist and quartzite sediments in granitic mountains.
