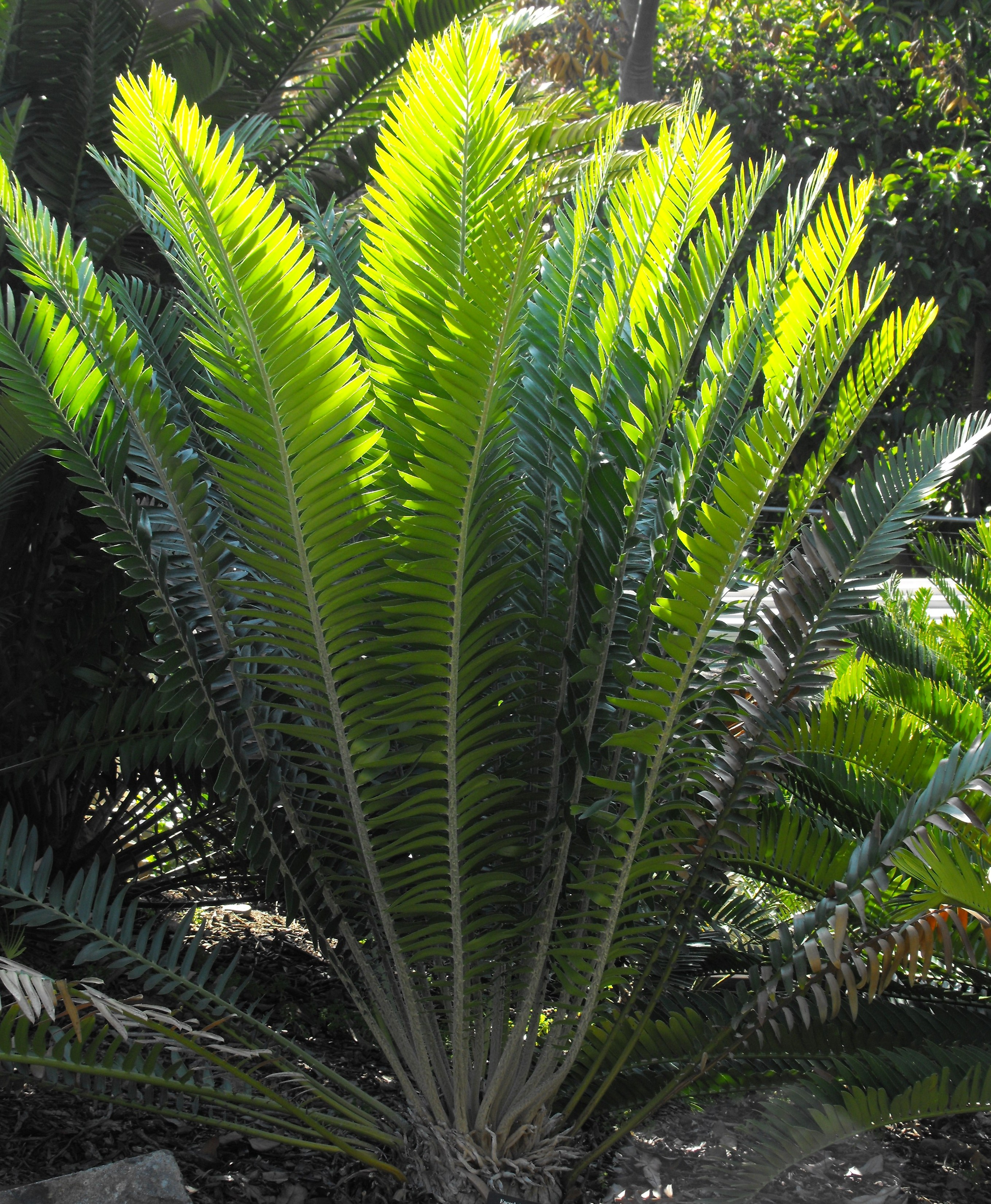

Conservation status
- Critically Endangered (IUCN 3.1)
- CITES Appendix I (CITES)

Scientific classification
- Kingdom: Plantae
- Clade: Tracheophytes
- Clade: Gymnospermae
- Division: Cycadophyta
- Class: Cycadopsida
- Order: Cycadales
- Family: Zamiaceae
- Genus: Encephalartos
- Species: E. pterogonus

Binomial name
- Encephalartos pterogonus R.A.Dyer & I.Verd. 2010

= Encephalartos pterogonus =

Species of cycad

Encephalartos pterogonus is a species of cycad that is native to Mount Mruwere (Monte Urueri) and adjacent mountains in the Manica province of Mozambique.

== Description ==
This cycad has an upright stem, reaching up to 1.5 m in height and about 40 cm in diameter, sometimes producing additional stems from suckers at its base.

Its pinnate leaves, 1.2-1.5 m long, form a crown at the top of the stem, supported by 4-8 cm long petioles. Each leaf consists of several pairs of dark green lanceolate leaflets, typically 15-18 cm long.

This species is dioecious. Male specimens bear 1-3 spindle-shaped cones, 30–38 cm long and 10–11 cm wide, on stalks. Female specimens have 2-3 roughly cylindrical cones, 35–40 cm long and 16-18 cm wide, in bright green colour.

The seeds are roughly ovoid, 28–35 mm long, and have an orange-red sarcotesta covering when ripe.
