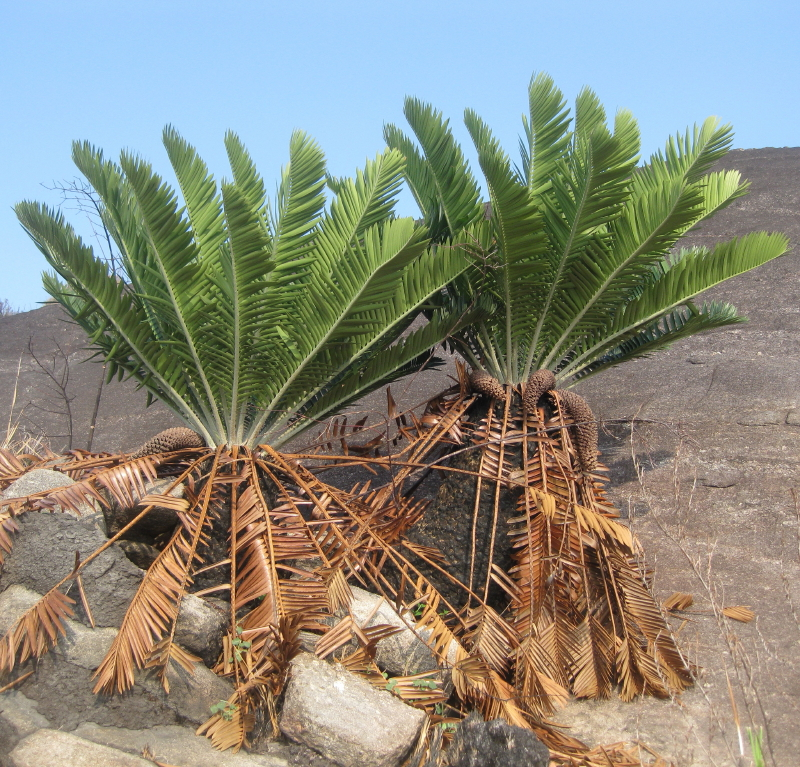

Conservation status
- Least Concern (IUCN 3.1)
- CITES Appendix I (CITES)

Scientific classification
- Kingdom: Plantae
- Clade: Tracheophytes
- Clade: Gymnospermae
- Division: Cycadophyta
- Class: Cycadopsida
- Order: Cycadales
- Family: Zamiaceae
- Genus: Encephalartos
- Species: E. turneri

Binomial name
- Encephalartos turneri Lavranos & D.L. Goode 1985[1988]

= Encephalartos turneri =

Species of cycad

Encephalartos turneri is a species of cycad that is native to Mozambique. The Encephalartos turneri was discovered by Ian Sutherland Turner in Nampula, Mozambique.

== Description ==
It is a cycad with an erect or sometimes decumbent stem, up to 3 m tall and with a diameter of 80 cm, covered with ovate, densely tomentose catafilli; often secondary stems originate from suckers that arise at the base of the main stem.

The leaves, pinnate, arched, up to 150 cm long, are arranged in a crown at the apex of the stem and are composed of numerous pairs of lanceolate leaflets, with entire margins and hooked apex, on average 20 cm long, reduced to thorns towards the base of the petiole.

It is a dioecious species with male specimens that have 1 to 3 subcylindrical cones, about 30 cm long and 8–10 cm broad, pedunculated, yellowish in color, tomentose, and female specimens that have from 1 to 3 ovoid cones, about 28 long cm and with a diameter of 15 cm, more or less the same color as the male ones.

The seeds are oblong, 32–35 mm long, covered with a brownish sarcotesta.

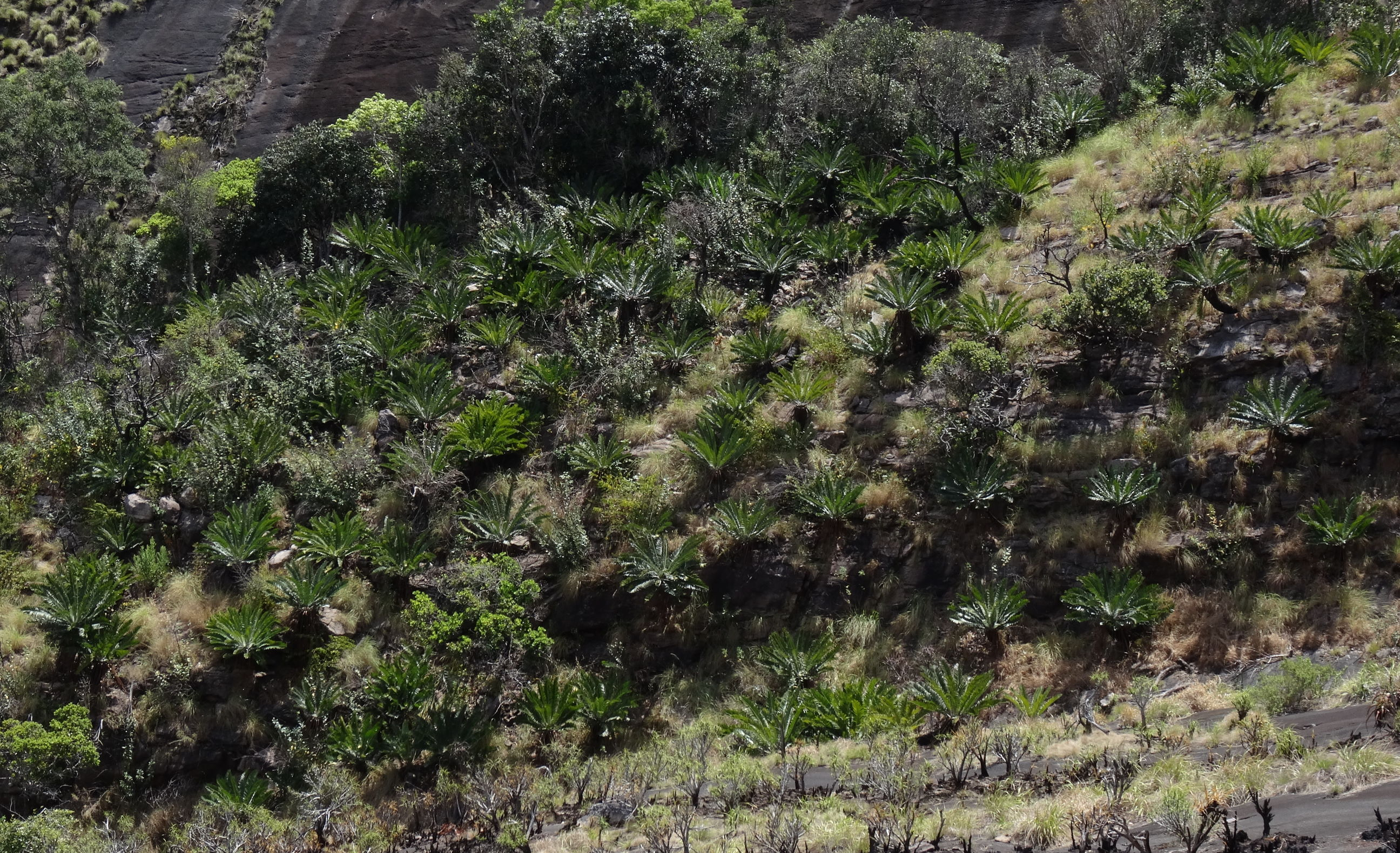
E. turneri habitat in Northern Mozambique

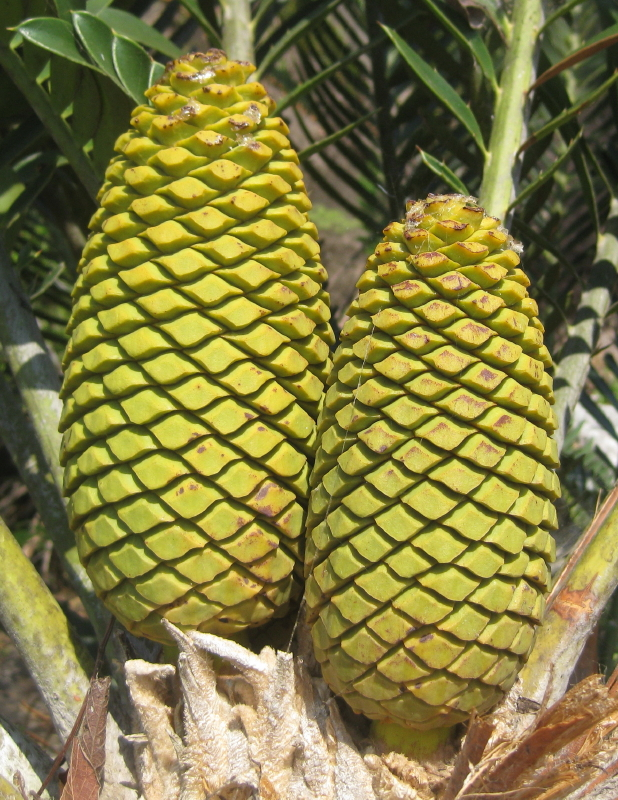
Cones

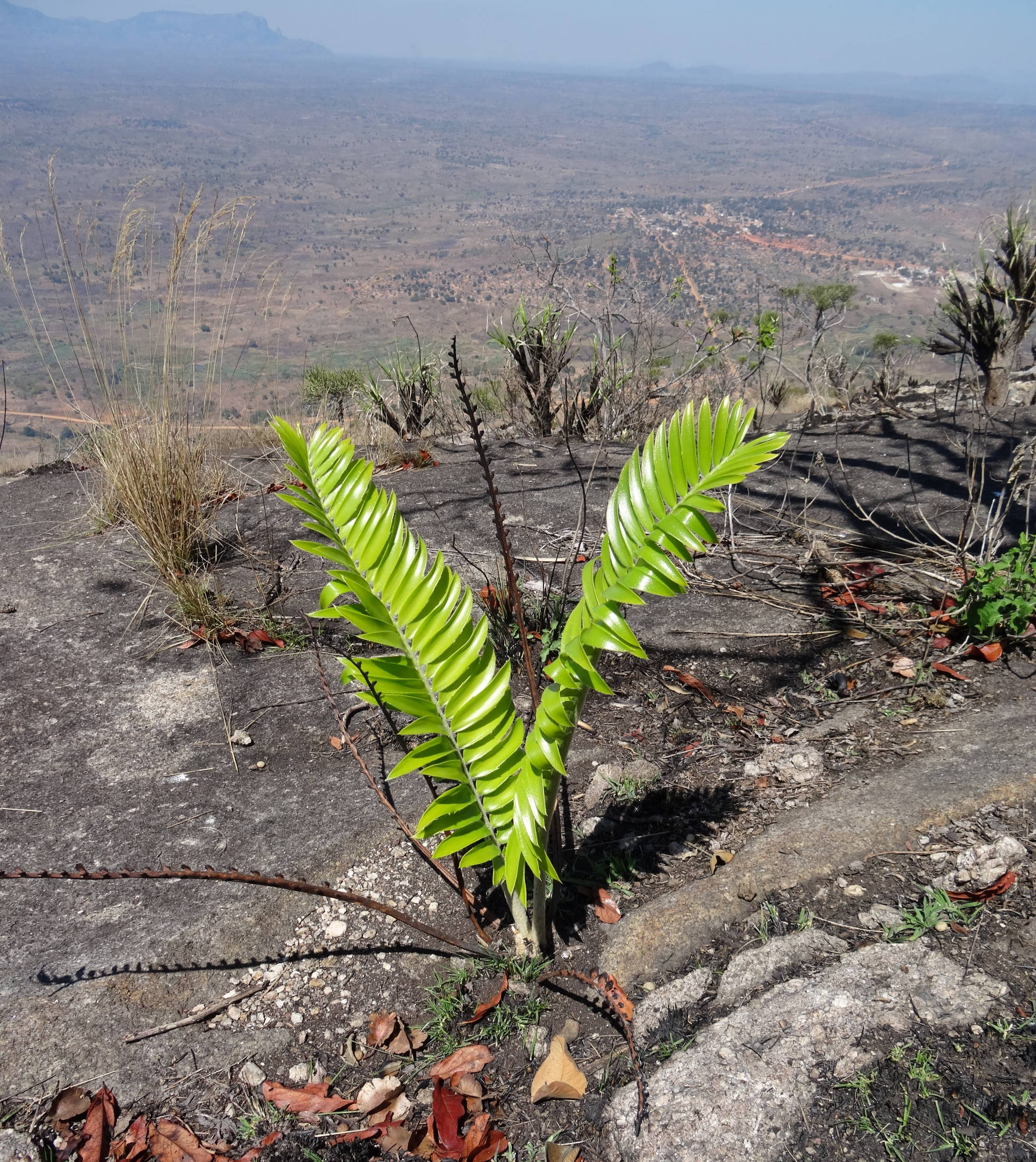
young plant
