= Encephalartos macrostrobilus =

Conservation status
- Endangered (IUCN 3.1)
- CITES Appendix I (CITES)

Scientific classification
- Kingdom: Plantae
- Clade: Tracheophytes
- Clade: Gymnospermae
- Division: Cycadophyta
- Class: Cycadopsida
- Order: Cycadales
- Family: Zamiaceae
- Genus: Encephalartos
- Species: E. macrostrobilus

Binomial name
- Encephalartos macrostrobilus Scott Jones & Jeff Wynants

Species of cycad

Encephalartos macrostrobilus is a species of cycad in Africa. It is found only in Moyo District, northwestern Uganda, which is populated predominantly by the ethnic Madi.

== Description ==
This cycad has an upright or sprawling trunk, reaching up to 2.5 m in height and 30-45 cm in diameter. Its feather-like leaves form a crown at the top of the trunk, measuring 1.4-2.2 m long. Each leaf is supported by a 12-15 cm long stem and consists of numerous pairs of lance-shaped, tough leaflets, each up to 25 cm long, arranged at right angles to the central axis.

This species is dioecious, meaning individual plants are either male or female. Male plants produce 6 to 14 closely packed, upright, oval cones that are 18-20 cm long and 5 cm wide, initially olive green and turning dark green as they ripen. Female plants bear 1-3 large cylindrical-ovoid cones that can grow up to 80 cm long and 30 cm wide, initially dark green and turning olive green when ripe.

The seeds of this cycad are rough ovals, measuring 3.2-3.6 cm in length, and covered by a yellow to red sarcotesta.
