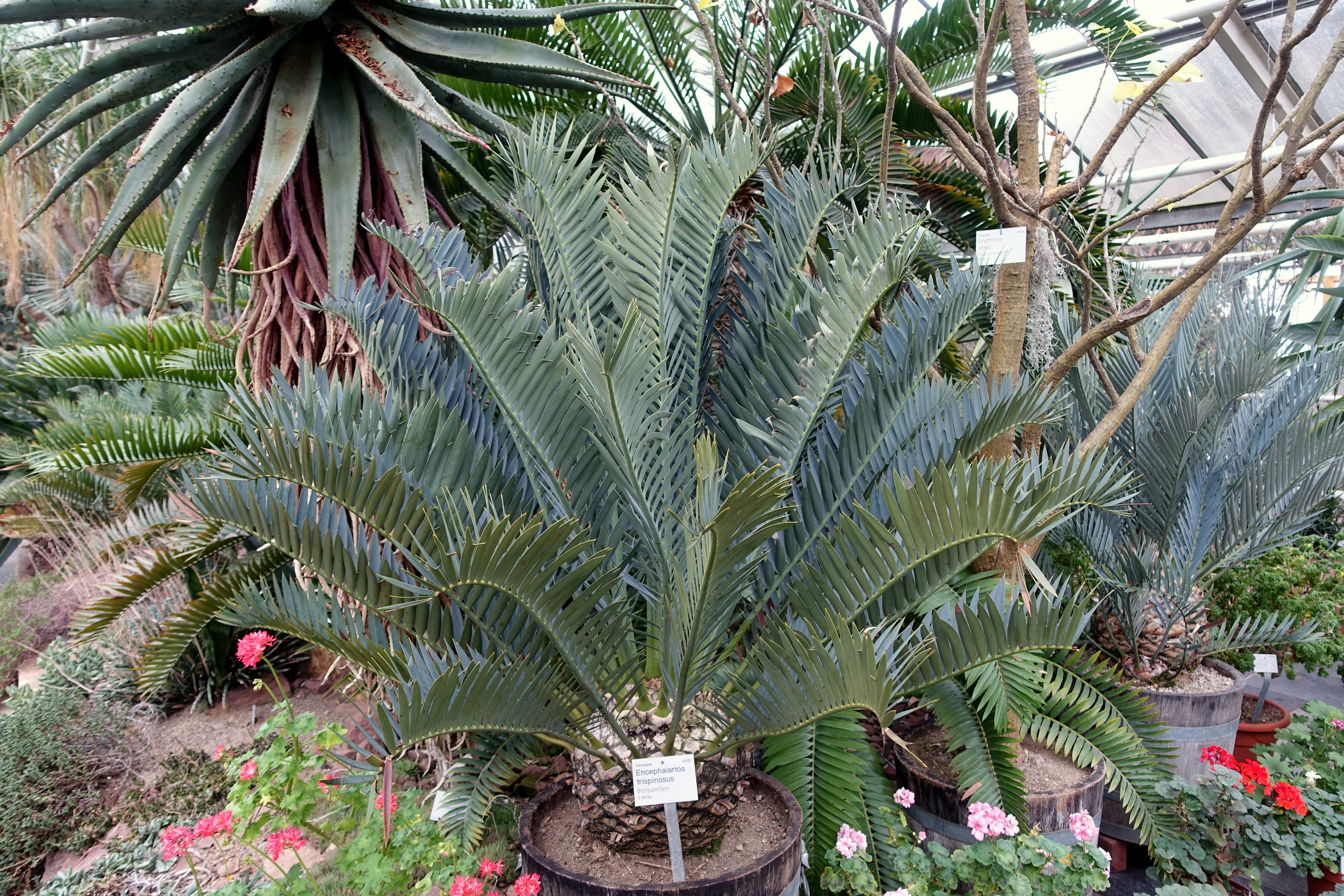

Conservation status
- Vulnerable (IUCN 3.1)
- CITES Appendix I (CITES)

Scientific classification
- Kingdom: Plantae
- Clade: Tracheophytes
- Clade: Gymnospermae
- Division: Cycadophyta
- Class: Cycadopsida
- Order: Cycadales
- Family: Zamiaceae
- Genus: Encephalartos
- Species: E. trispinosus

Binomial name
- Encephalartos trispinosus R.A. Dyer

= Encephalartos trispinosus =

Species of cycad

Encephalartos trispinosus is a species of cycad that is native to the Eastern Cape Province of South Africa.

== Description ==
This cycad is characterized by an upright stem reaching up to 1 meter in height and 25–30 cm in diameter. It often produces secondary stems from basal suckers. Its pinnate leaves form a crown at the top of the stem, ranging in color from gray-greenish to blue and reaching lengths of up to 1.4 meters. These leaves are composed of numerous pairs of obovate, leathery, and hairy leaflets, each up to 18 cm long, with 1–3 spines along the lower margin and a sharp tip. This species is dioecious, with male specimens bearing one or rarely two erect, sub-cylindrical cones measuring 25–35 cm in length and about 8 cm in width, ranging in color from yellow to green. Female specimens have solitary cylindrical-ovoid cones, approximately 40–50 cm long and 16–18 cm wide, with a conical apex, also yellow to greenish-yellow in color. The seeds are roughly ovoid, about 3.5 cm long, and covered with a brown to red sarcotesta.
