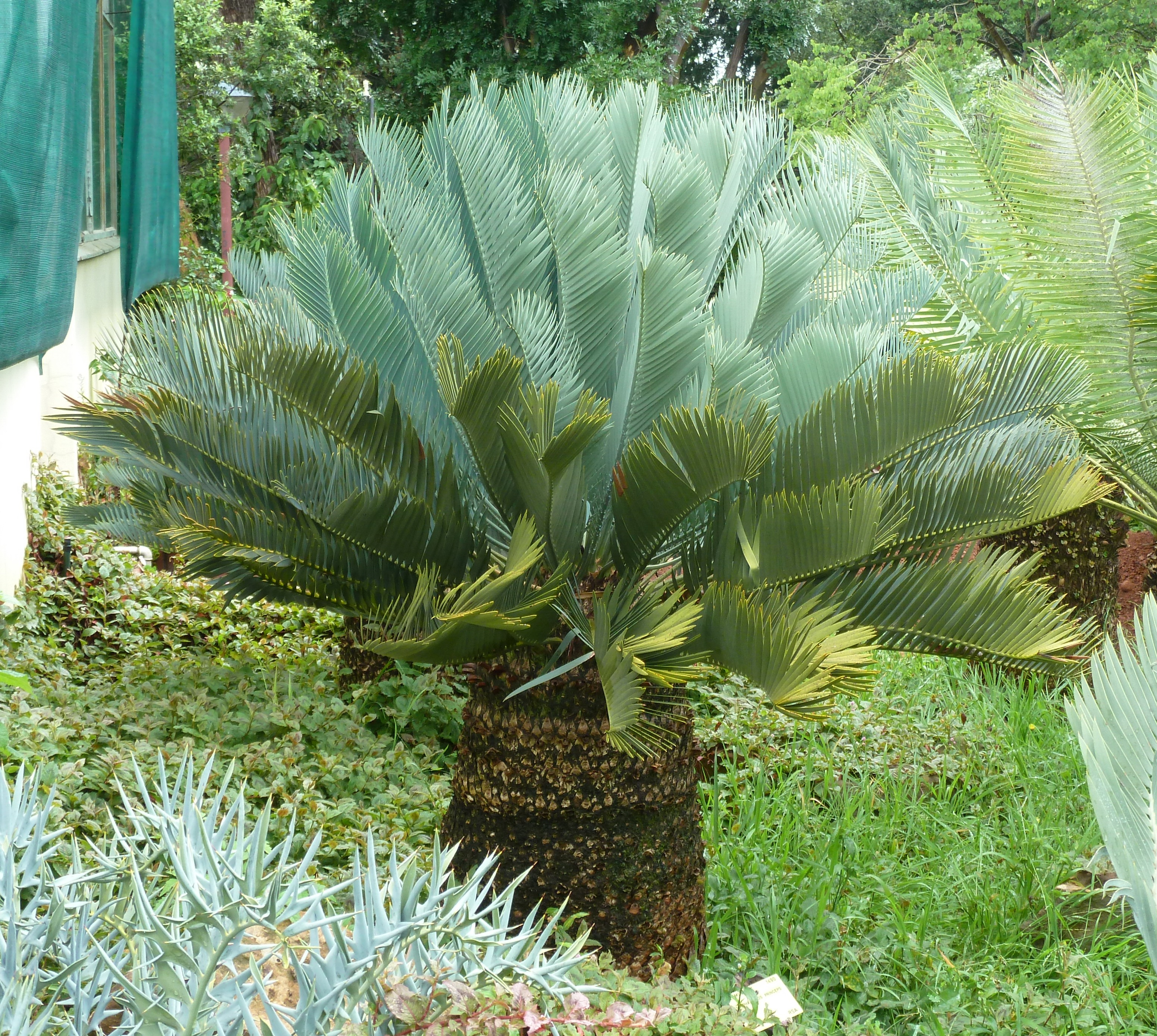

Conservation status
- Vulnerable (IUCN 3.1)
- CITES Appendix I

Scientific classification
- Kingdom: Plantae
- Clade: Tracheophytes
- Clade: Gymnospermae
- Division: Cycadophyta
- Class: Cycadopsida
- Order: Cycadales
- Family: Zamiaceae
- Genus: Encephalartos
- Species: E. princeps

Binomial name
- Encephalartos princeps R.A.Dyer 2010

= Encephalartos princeps =

Species of cycad

Encephalartos princeps is a species of cycad that is native to Eastern Cape Province of South Africa.

== Descriptions ==
This is a tall arborescent cycad species, with a stem reaching up to 6 meters in height. The stem can be erect, sometimes decumbent, or even hanging, with a diameter of 40–60 centimeters.

Its pinnate leaves are arranged in a crown at the top of the stem, measuring 100–130 centimeters long. They are silvery-green to bluish-green, with a 15–26 centimeter-long petiole. The leaves are made up of numerous lanceolate, opposite leaflets, each 15–19 centimeters long and 13–20 millimeters wide. They have a leathery texture and are attached to the rachis at a 45° angle.

This species is dioecious, meaning male and female reproductive organs are found on separate plants. Male specimens typically bear 1 to 3 sub-cylindrical, olive-green cones, each 16–26 centimeters long and 8–10 centimeters in diameter. Female specimens also have 1 to 3 cones, but these are ovoid, measuring 30–40 centimeters long and 20–25 centimeters in diameter.

The seeds are ovoid, about 24–26 millimeters long, and covered with a red sarcotesta.

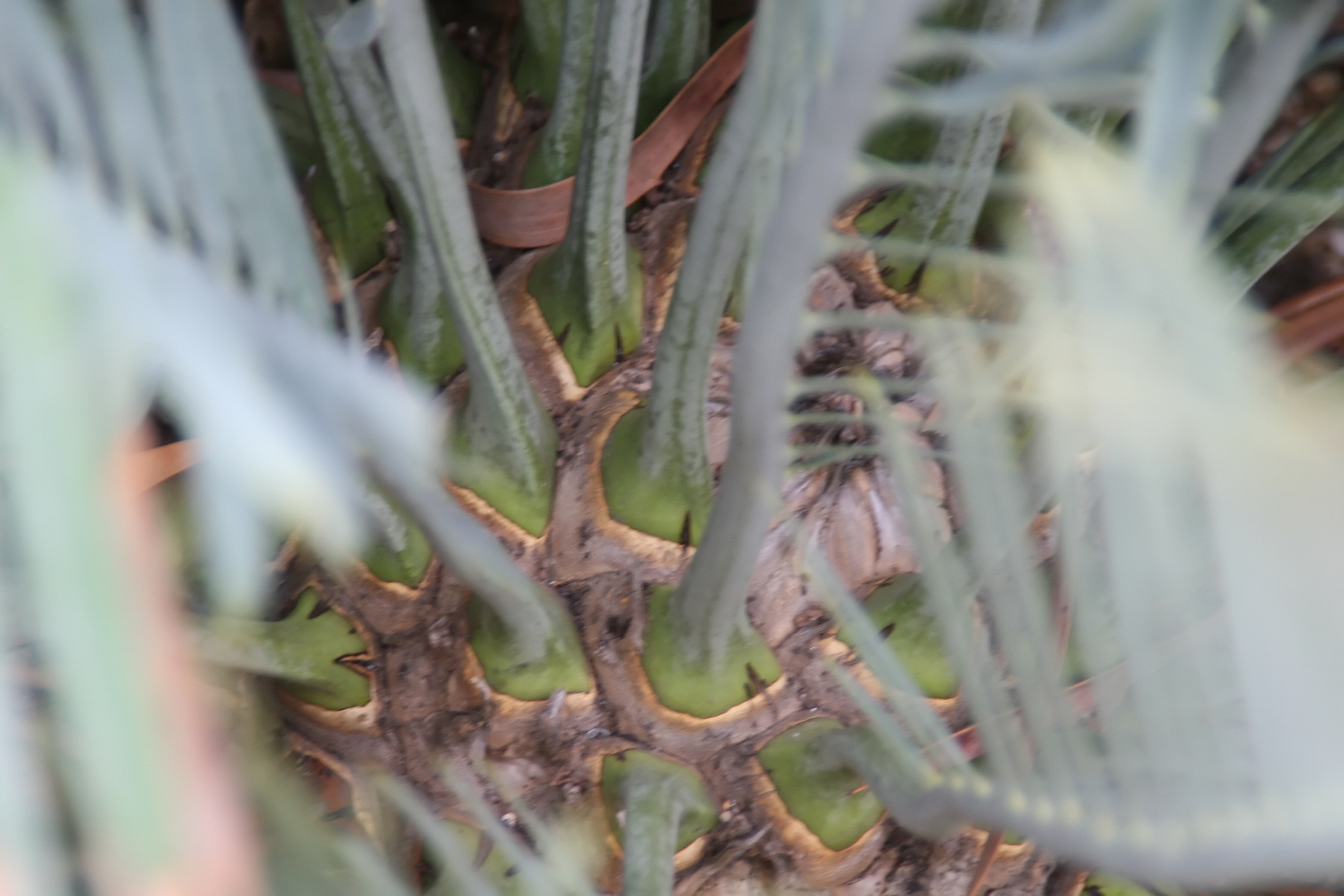
trunk

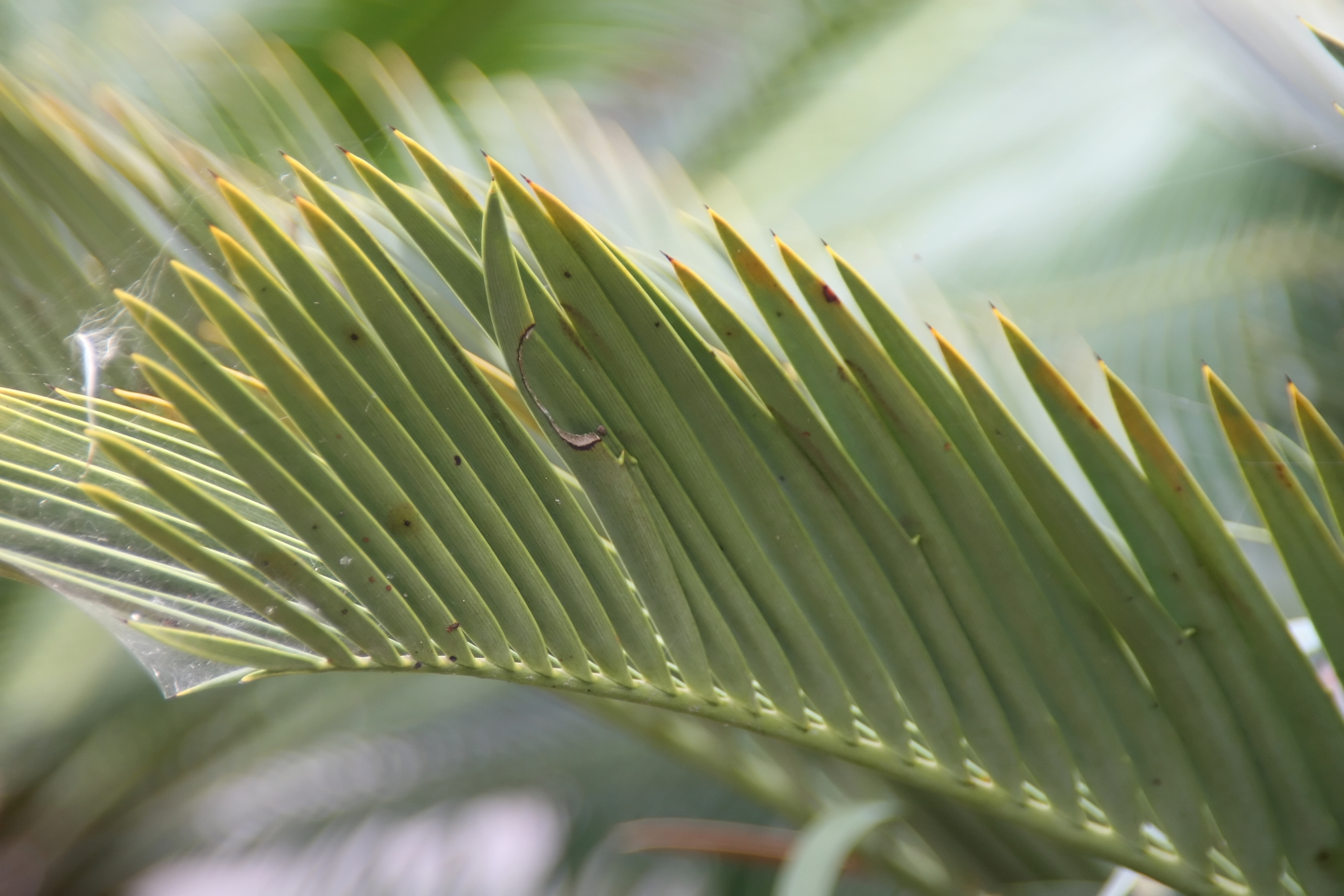
Leaves

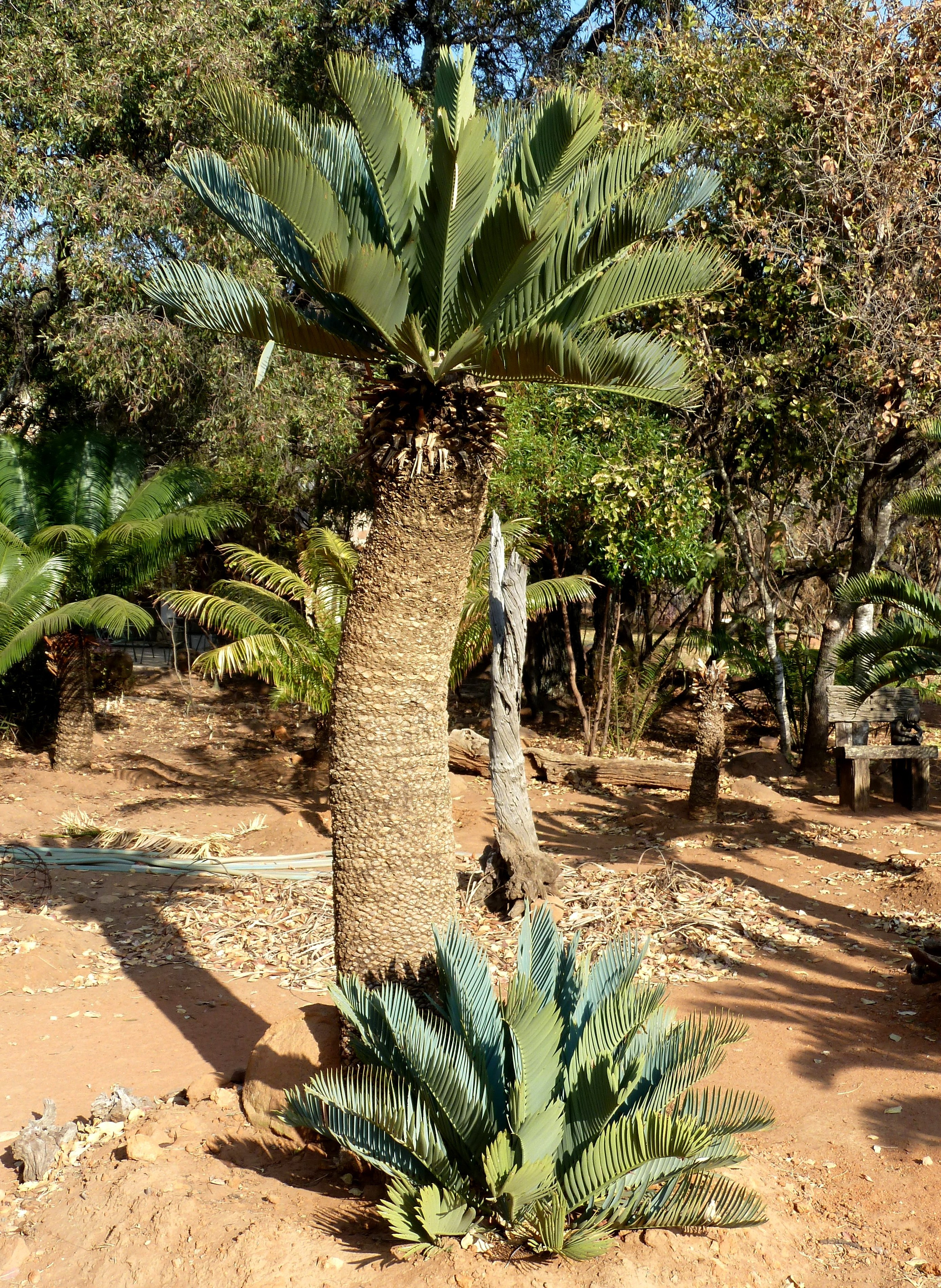
Mature plant
