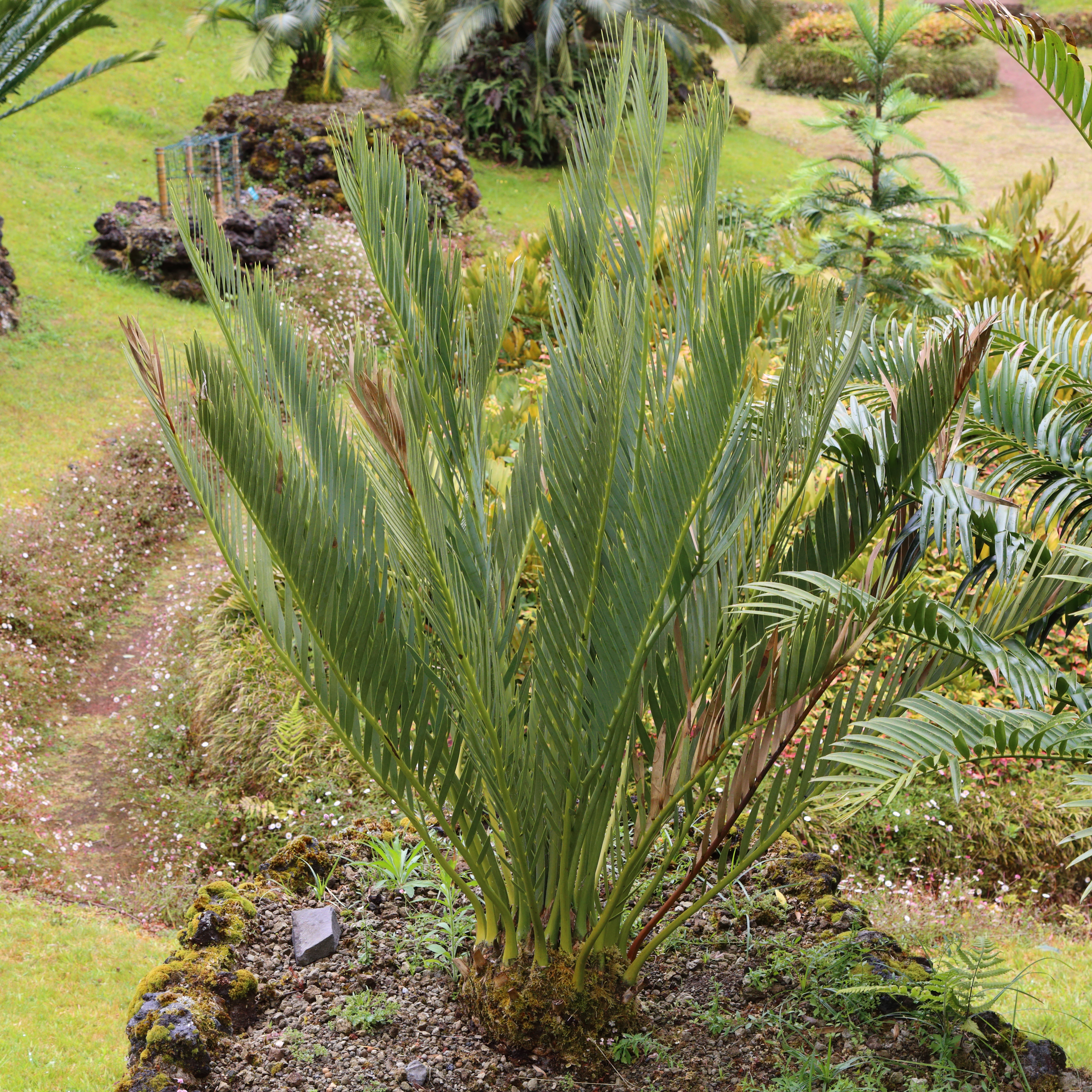

Conservation status
- Critically Endangered (IUCN 3.1)
- CITES Appendix I (CITES)

Scientific classification
- Kingdom: Plantae
- Clade: Tracheophytes
- Clade: Gymnospermae
- Division: Cycadophyta
- Class: Cycadopsida
- Order: Cycadales
- Family: Zamiaceae
- Genus: Encephalartos
- Species: E. middelburgensis

Binomial name
- Encephalartos middelburgensis Vorster, Robbertse & S. Van der Westh. 1989

Synonyms
- Encephalartos eugene-maraissii subspecies middelburgensis Lavranos & D.L.Goode

= Encephalartos middelburgensis =

Species of cycad

Encephalartos middelburgensis is a species of cycad that is native to Gauteng and Mpumalanga provinces of South Africa at elevations of 1,100–1,400 m (3,600–4,600 ft).

== Description ==
It is a cycad with an arborescent habit, with an erect or decumbent stem, up to 10 m (33 ft) tall and 35–45 cm (14–18 in) in diameter, often with secondary stems originating from basal suckers. The leaves, pinnate, arranged in a crown at the apex of the stem, are 1.2–1.5 m (3 ft 11 in – 4 ft 11 in) long, supported by a 30–40 cm (12–16 in) long petiole with a densely tomentose base, and composed of numerous pairs of lanceolate, leathery leaflets, up to 20 cm (7.9 in) long, with entire margin or occasionally with a single spine on the inferior margin and sharp apex.

It is a dioecious species, with male specimens that have from 1 to 8 cylindrical or strictly ovoid cones, erect, 30–55 cm (12–22 in) long and 8–12 cm (3.1–4.7 in) broad, green in color and covered with a brownish tomentum, and female specimens with 1-6 cylindrical cones, about 35–45 cm (14–18 in) long and 17–20 cm (6.7–7.9 in) wide, the same color as the male cones.

The seeds are coarsely ovoid, 3–3.5 cm (1.2–1.4 in) long, covered with a yellow to brown sarcotesta.

== Population ==
Initially, this species could be found inhabiting multiple locations in the proximity of Middelburg, Bronkhorstspruit, and the Loskop Dam within South Africa's Mpumalanga province. It is believed that the population consisted of several thousand mature individuals. However, in recent years, the population has experienced a substantial and concerning decline. It is estimated there are 184-200 mature individuals in the wild.

The species is typically found within open grassland areas and sheltered valleys.

== Threats ==
Encephalartos middelburgensis faces a variety of challenges that pose a significant risk to its survival and the health of its habitat.

The discovery of the Encephalartos middelburgensis in the 1960s in the Middelburg district led to a serious threat from collectors. The accessibility of the sites and their proximity to urban areas like the Pretoria/Witwatersrand complex resulted in extensive exploitation during the peak of cycad collecting. While legislation has helped curtail collector activities, individuals still exploit the taxon to this day.

The development of semi-intensive agricultural areas within and around the species' distribution range has led to increased burning of its habitat and grazing practices. Encephalartos middelburgensis is very susceptible to fire.

Authorities from Gauteng Nature Conservation, during the years 2005-2010, observed evidence of disease affecting the stems of the few remaining wild Middelburg Cycad plants in Gauteng. In Mpumalanga, officials have detected signs of intensive poaching in some subpopulations, often involving the removal of suckers from the plants. Additionally, there is evidence that pollinators are absent from several subpopulations, hindering the species' natural regeneration.
