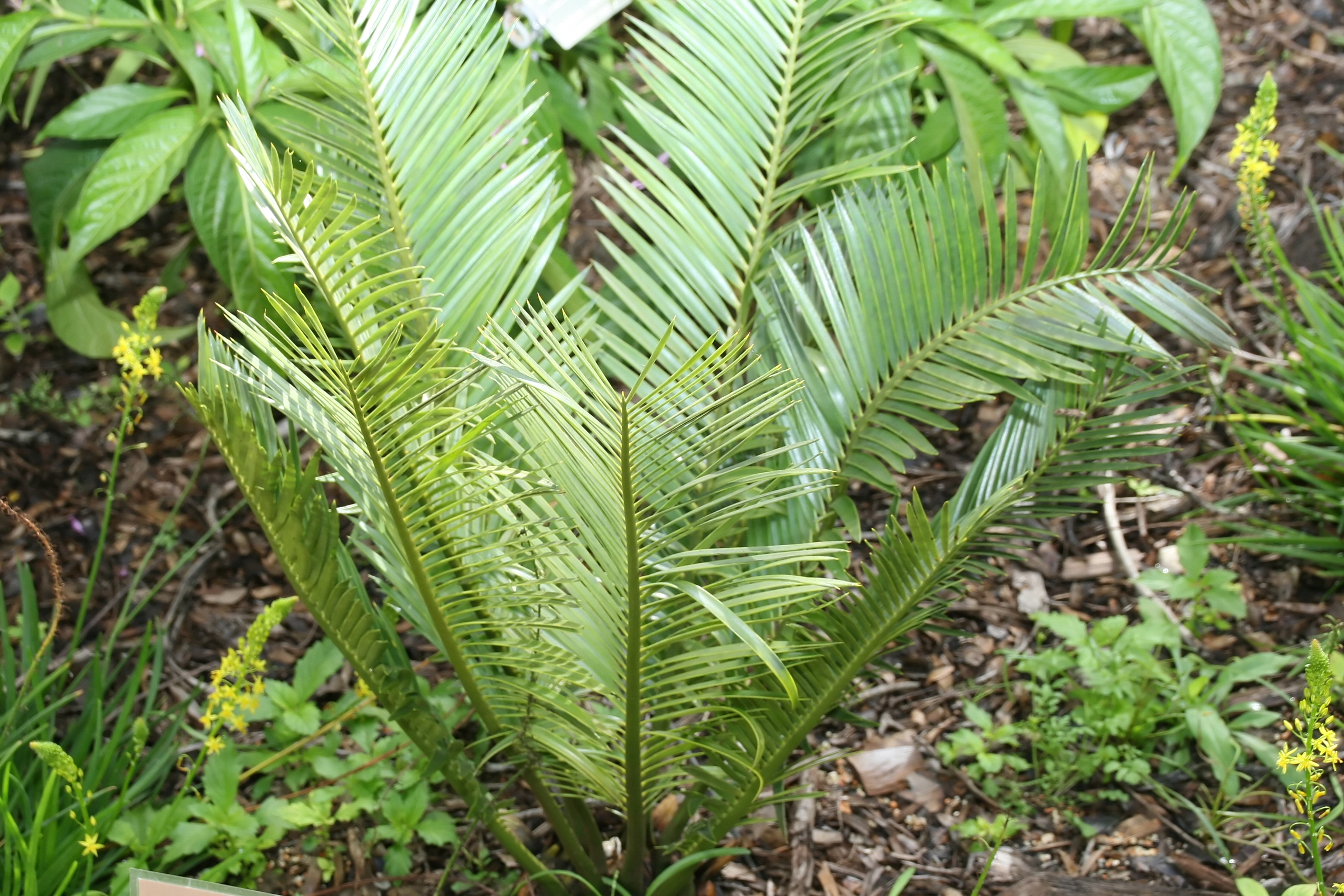

Conservation status
- Critically endangered, possibly extinct in the wild (IUCN 3.1)
- CITES Appendix I (CITES)

Scientific classification
- Kingdom: Plantae
- Clade: Tracheophytes
- Clade: Gymnospermae
- Division: Cycadophyta
- Class: Cycadopsida
- Order: Cycadales
- Family: Zamiaceae
- Genus: Encephalartos
- Species: E. cerinus

Binomial name
- Encephalartos cerinus Lavranos & D.L.Goode

= Encephalartos cerinus =

Species of cycad

Encephalartos cerinus or Waxen Cycad is a species of cycad in Africa.

== Description ==
This cycad is stemless, growing from an underground stem that's about 30 cm long and 25 cm wide. Occasionally, a small part of the stem may emerge above the ground.

Its leaves, numbering from eight to ten, are flat and opaque, measuring 80–120 cm long, and have a bluish or silvery green hue. The leaflets, 15–18 cm long, are arranged oppositely along the rachis at an angle of 150–180°. They have a thick, waxy coating that releases a distinct odor when rubbed. The leaf margins are smooth with small teeth.

This species is dioecious, with male cones that are spindle-shaped, 55–60 cm long, and 9–10 cm wide. Female cones are ovoid, 30–35 cm long, and 15–18 cm in diameter. Each plant produces only one cone at a time, which changes color from bluish green to yellow as it matures.

The seeds are oblong, measuring 25–30 mm long, and are covered with an orange or yellow sarcotesta.
