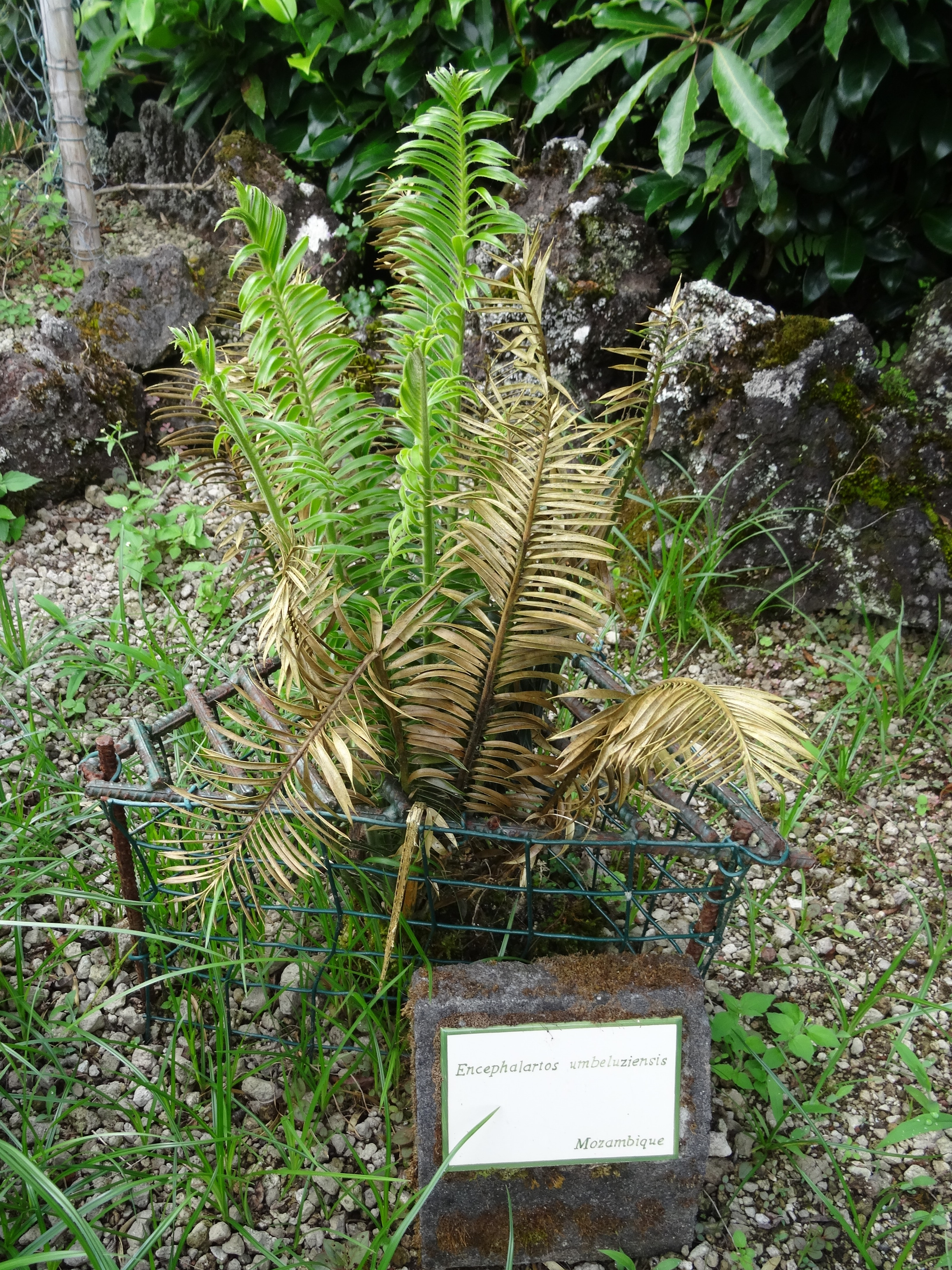

Conservation status
- Endangered (IUCN 3.1)
- CITES Appendix I (CITES)

Scientific classification
- Kingdom: Plantae
- Clade: Tracheophytes
- Clade: Gymnospermae
- Division: Cycadophyta
- Class: Cycadopsida
- Order: Cycadales
- Family: Zamiaceae
- Genus: Encephalartos
- Species: E. umbeluziensis

Binomial name
- Encephalartos umbeluziensis R.A.Dyer

= Encephalartos umbeluziensis =

Species of cycad plant from Africa

Encephalartos umbeluziensis is a species of cycad from Africa.

== Description ==
This is a short, underground-stemmed cycad. It has 2 to 5 pinnate leaves, each 1–2 m long and slightly curved, supported by a thin 5–10 cm long petiole. The leaves consist of many pairs of lance-shaped, tough leaflets, each up to 30 cm long, with a spine on the upper edge and 1-3 spines on the lower edge. It's a dioecious plant, with male specimens producing 1 to 4 olive green to yellowish, subcylindrical cones, each 25–35 cm long and 6–8 cm wide. Female specimens have 1-4 cylindrical cones, 25–30 cm long and 12–15 cm wide, similar in color to the male cones. The seeds are roughly oval, 2.5-3.5 cm long, and covered with a brown sarcotesta.
