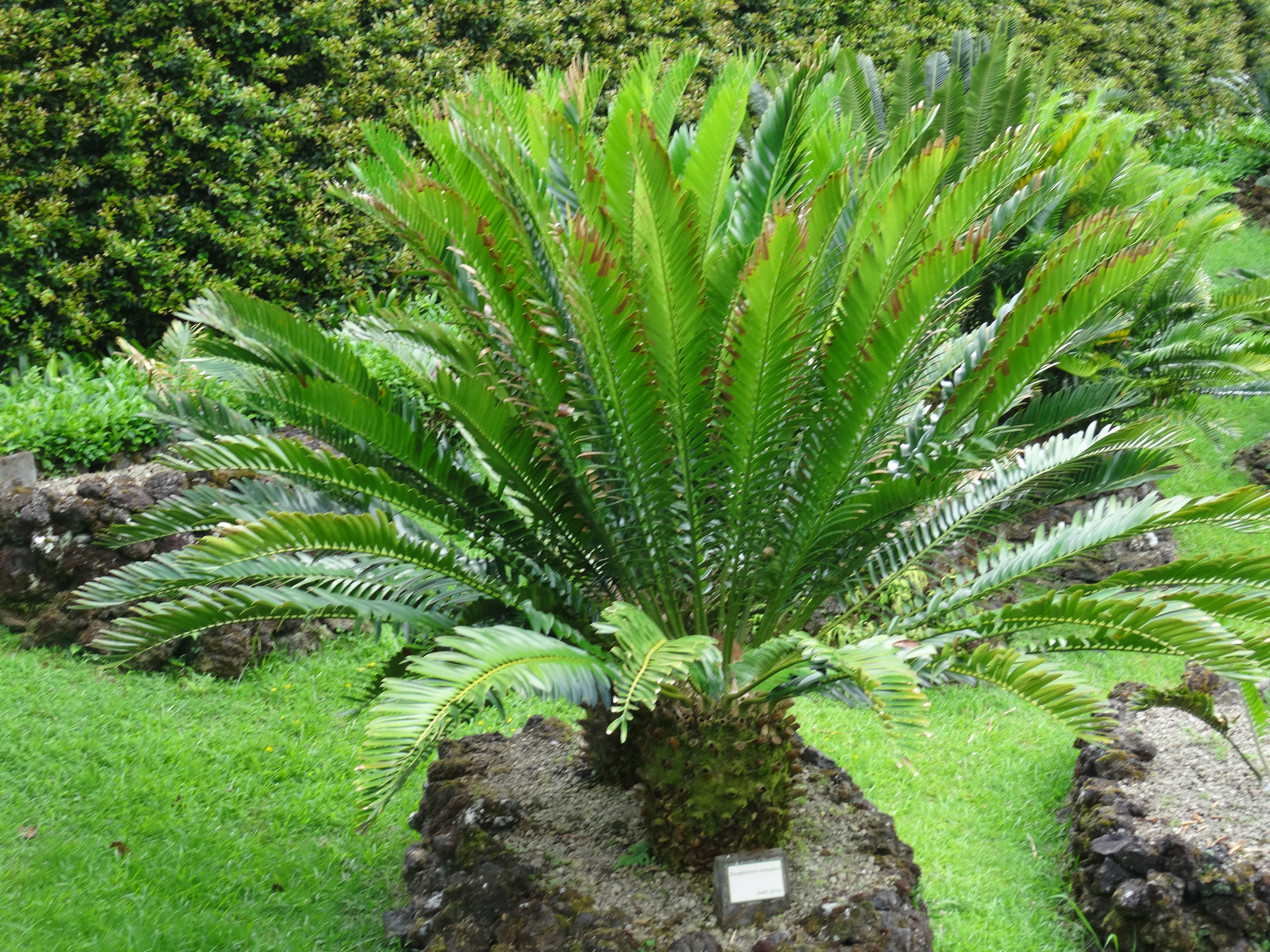

Conservation status
- Critically Endangered (IUCN 3.1)
- CITES Appendix I (CITES)

Scientific classification
- Kingdom: Plantae
- Clade: Tracheophytes
- Clade: Gymnospermae
- Division: Cycadophyta
- Class: Cycadopsida
- Order: Cycadales
- Family: Zamiaceae
- Genus: Encephalartos
- Species: E. msinganus

Binomial name
- Encephalartos msinganus Vorster

= Encephalartos msinganus =

Species of cycad

Encephalartos msinganus is a species of cycad from Kwazulu-Natal.

== Description ==
This cycad is tree like with a stem that can grow up to 3 meters tall and 35 centimeters in diameter.

Its leaves are light green, stiff, and 110-150 centimeters long, with a keeled shape. The green spine is straight or slightly curved. The lanceolate leaflets are 14–17 cm long, arranged oppositely on the rachis at an angle of about 60º. The margins are smooth, and the apex thins to form a robust spine. The basal leaves are smaller and often reduced to spines.

This species is dioecious, with ovoid-shaped male cones that are pale yellow and 30–40 cm long and 11–12 cm broad. Each plant can have up to four of these cones. The female cones are about the same shape, 42 cm long, 22 cm in diameter, and may be covered with thin brown hair. Usually, each plant produces one or two of these cones. The seeds are oblong and covered by a red sarcotesta.
