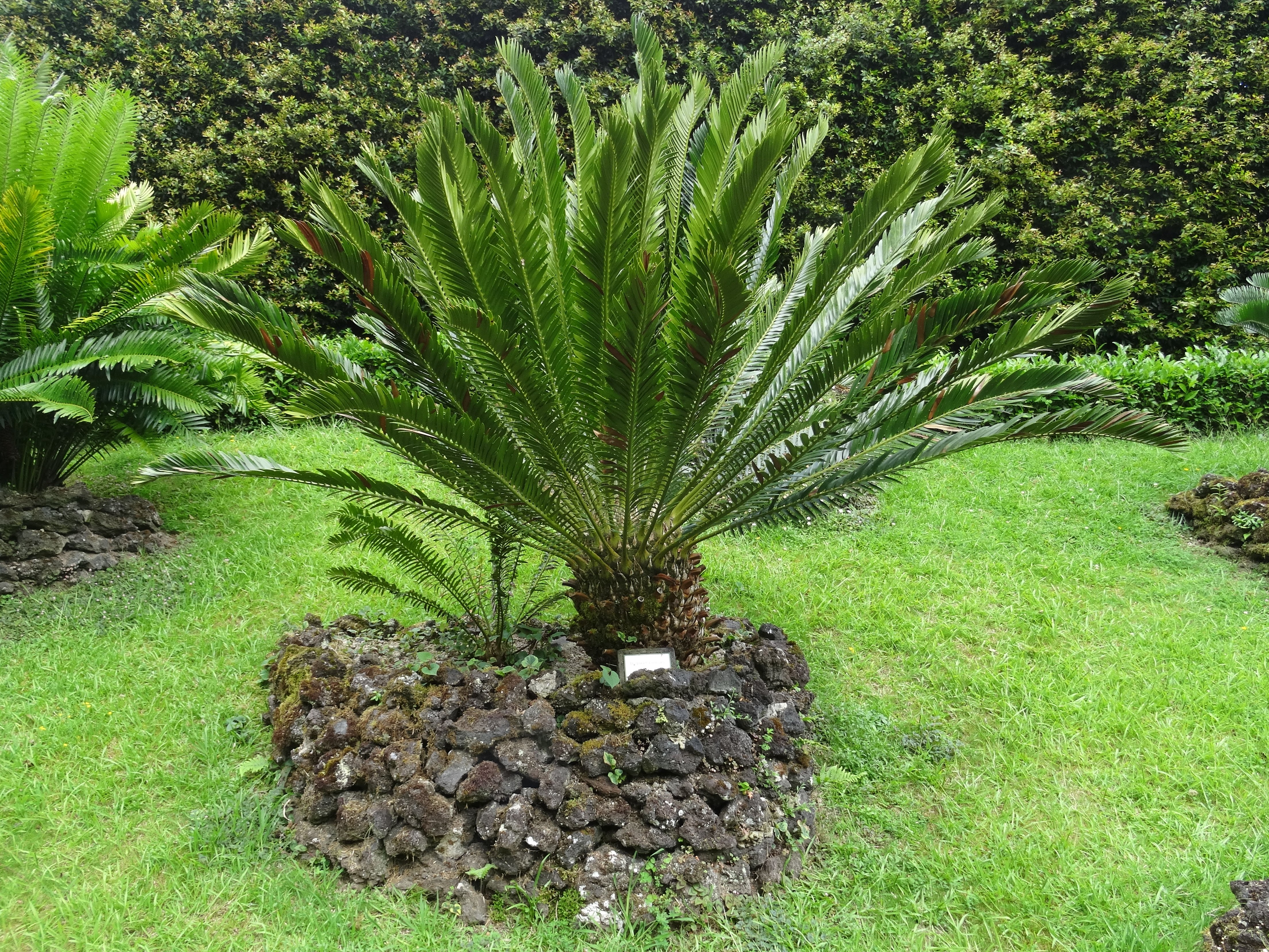

Conservation status
- Critically Endangered (IUCN 3.1)
- CITES Appendix I (CITES)

Scientific classification
- Kingdom: Plantae
- Clade: Tracheophytes
- Clade: Gymnospermae
- Division: Cycadophyta
- Class: Cycadopsida
- Order: Cycadales
- Family: Zamiaceae
- Genus: Encephalartos
- Species: E. aemulans

Binomial name
- Encephalartos aemulans Vorster

= Encephalartos aemulans =

Species of cycad plant from South Africa

Encephalartos aemulans, the Ngotshe cycad, is a species of cycad endemic to South Africa. It is listed by the IUCN as Critically Endangered and by CITES in Appendix I. Only 100-250 are believed to be left, with a decreasing population trend. Its main threat is collecting of wild specimens.

== Description ==
These plants have a tall, unbranched stem that can grow up to 3 m tall and 35 cm wide. The leaves, which can reach 2 m in length, are made up of pointed leaflets with spiny edges, each about 12–15 cm long, arranged oppositely along the stem at an angle of 135°. This species is dioecious, meaning it has separate male and female plants. The male plants have oval, yellow cones that are 29–38 cm long and 14–18 cm wide, with broad, rhombic microsporophylls. The female cones are yellow-green, 35–40 cm long, and 20–23 cm wide, with macrosporophylls that have a bumpy surface. The seeds are oblong, about 25–30 mm long, and covered with red sarcotesta.

== Distribution and habitat ==
The species is endemic to KwaZulu-Natal in South Africa, were a single population is known. It occurs among sandstone cliffs in shortgrass savannah at altitudes of 1,000-1,100 m, with individual specimens found at lower altitudes.
