= Encephalartos schmitzii =

Conservation status
- Vulnerable (IUCN 3.1)
- CITES Appendix I (CITES)

Scientific classification
- Kingdom: Plantae
- Clade: Tracheophytes
- Clade: Gymnospermae
- Division: Cycadophyta
- Class: Cycadopsida
- Order: Cycadales
- Family: Zamiaceae
- Genus: Encephalartos
- Species: E. schmitzii

Binomial name
- Encephalartos schmitzii Malaisse

Species of cycad

Encephalartos schmitzii (Schmitz's cycad) is a species of cycad in Africa.

== Description ==
This cycad has an underground stem that is typically no more than 30 cm tall and about 20 cm in diameter. Its pinnate leaves, 40–60 cm long, form a crown at the top of the stem and are supported by short, spiny petioles. Each leaf consists of many pairs of lanceolate leaflets, around 10-14 cm long, with entire or slightly toothed margins, and a glaucous green color. The leaflets are arranged at an angle of 45-80° on the rachis.

This species is dioecious, with male plants bearing 1-3 cylinder-ovoid cones that are 8–10 cm long and 3–4 cm wide, bluish-green in color. Female plants have solitary ovoid cones that are 20–25 cm long and 10–12 cm in diameter. The seeds are roughly ovoid, 20–25 mm long, and have an orange-red sarcotesta covering.

== Range ==
Encephalartos schmitzii occurs in the Luapula River watershed, in Democratic Republic of the Congo (on the extreme south of the Kundelungu plateau, Shaba Province) and in Zambia (along the Muchinga escarpment in Luapula and Northern provinces). A subpopulation is also found in North-Western Province, Zambia, to the east of Solwezi.
