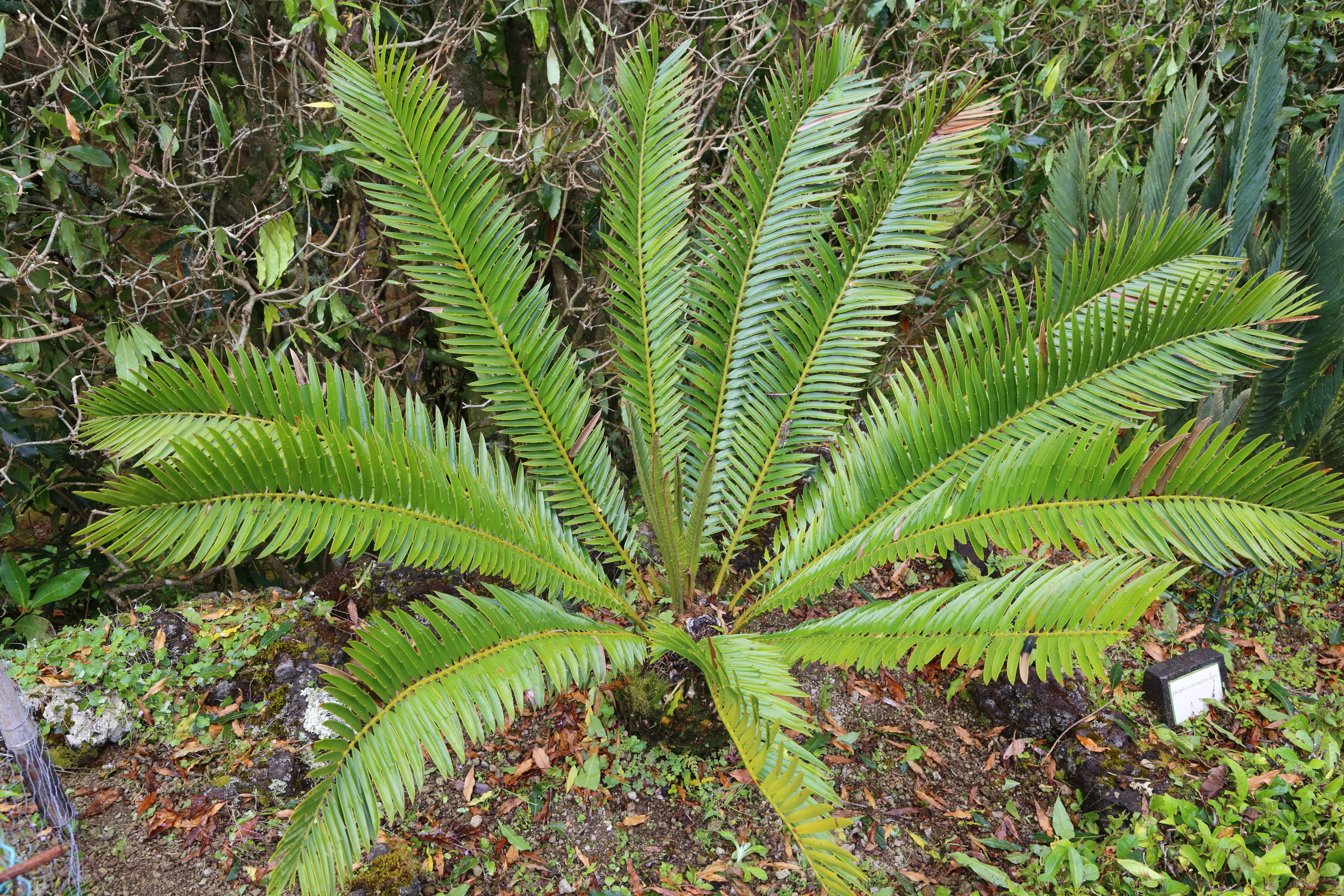

Conservation status
- Critically Endangered (IUCN 3.1)
- CITES Appendix I

Scientific classification
- Kingdom: Plantae
- Clade: Tracheophytes
- Clade: Gymnospermae
- Division: Cycadophyta
- Class: Cycadopsida
- Order: Cycadales
- Family: Zamiaceae
- Genus: Encephalartos
- Species: E. equatorialis

Binomial name
- Encephalartos equatorialis P.J.H.Hurter 1995

Synonyms
- Encephalartos imbricans Vorster

= Encephalartos equatorialis =

Species of cycad

Encephalartos equatorialis is a species of cycad that is found on two granite hills on the eastern shore of Thurston Bay, Lake Victoria, Uganda at elevations up to 1000 meters.

== Description ==
The cycad is 3.5–4 m tall and 35–45 cm in diameter. Its dark green leaves are rigid, 3–4 m long, and 30–40 cm broad, with a petiole up to 13 mm long. The leaflets, 20-25 cm long and about 20 mm wide, angle at 30° from the rachis. This dioecious species has male cones of 30–40 cm length and 9–10 cm diameter, and oblong microsporophylls of 20–30 mm by 10–15 mm. Its female cones are 35–40 cm long, 18–20 cm in diameter, with rhomboid macrosporophylls measuring 55 mm by 60 mm with a height of 30 mm. Each cone holds about 200 ellipsoidal seeds, 35–38 mm long and 23–30 mm in diameter, with an orange-red sarcotesta.
