= Cycad Nature Reserve =

Nature reserve in the Eastern Cape, South Africa

- Interactive map of Cycad Nature Reserve
- Type: Nature Reserve
- Nearest city: Bathurst
- Coordinates: 33°29′48″S 26°38′18″E
- Area: 43.60 ha (107.7 acres)
- Established: 10 December 1976

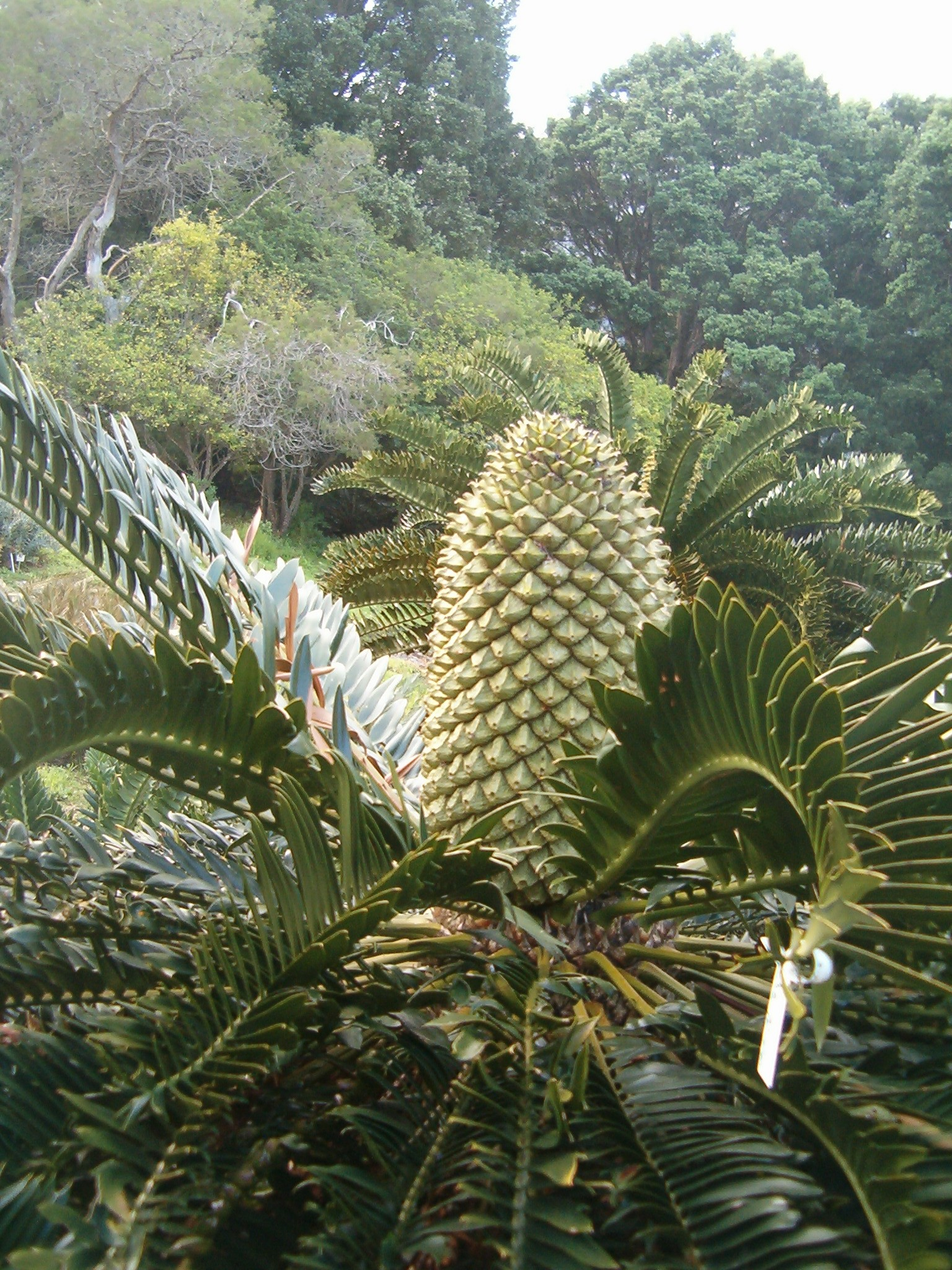
Encephalartos latifrons found in the reserve

The Cycad Nature Reserve is a small reserve near Bathurst for the purpose of conserving the critically endangered cycad Encephalartos latifrons. Near the reserve is the Waters Meeting Nature Reserve and Buffalo Kloof Protected Environment. Part of the Kariega River runs down the western and southern part of the reserve.

== History ==
In 1976, 43.60 ha of land was proclaimed for the conservation of the endangered Encephalartos latifrons.

== See also ==
- List of protected areas of South Africa
- Modjadji Nature Reserve – Cycad nature reserve in Limpopo
