= List of heritage sites in Limpopo =

This is a list of the heritage sites in Limpopo as recognised by the South African Heritage Resources Agency.

SAHRA identifier	Site name	Description	Town	District	NHRA status	Coordinates	Image
9/2/210/0001	Cycads, Modjadjiskraal, Bolobedu District	Forest of Modjadji cycads, Encephalartos transvenosus, in Modjadji Nature Reserve, which is also a site of cultural heritage of the Lobedu.		Bolobedu	Provincial Heritage Site	23°38′27″S 30°19′44″E	Upload Photo
9/2/243/0001	Ana Trees, Rietfontein, Mokerong District	The site is a group of Faidherbia albida trees, the largest indigenous trees in the central Transvaal. Traditions hold that the trees as sacred, and further that David Livingstone camped under them during one of his journeys and that the Voortrekkers held meetings there.		Mokerong	Provincial Heritage Site	24°05′59″S 28°54′42″E	Upload Photo
9/2/253/0001	Irish House, Market Street, Polokwane		Polokwane	Polokwane	Provincial Heritage Site	23°54′41″S 29°27′07″E	Upload Photo
9/2/253/0002	First National Bank, Landdros Mare Street, Polokwane	Type of site: Bank.	Polokwane	Polokwane		23°54′07″S 29°27′02″E	Upload Photo
9/2/253/0004-001	First Gold Crushing Site, Eersteling, Polokwane District	About 29 kilometres from Potgietersrust along the national road to Polokwane, a road turns off to the right and leads to Eersteling where one may still see the rock on which gold ore was first crushed in the Transvaal and the chimney of the first power pl The credit for the earliest discovery of gold in the Transvaal must go to Pieter Jacob Marais who, from 1853 onwards, found traces of alluvial gold in the Jukskei River and in the vicinity of Marabastad. After him, from 1868, Carl Mauch prospected for gol .		Polokwane	Provincial Heritage Site	24°07′28″S 29°16′04″E	About 29 kilometres from Potgietersrust along the national road to Polokwane, a road turns off to the right and leads to Eersteling where one may still see the rock on which gold ore was first crushed in the Transvaal and the chimney of the first power pl The credit for the earliest discovery of gold in the Transvaal must go to Pieter Jacob Marais who, from 1853 onwards, found traces of alluvial gold in the Jukskei River and in the vicinity of Marabastad. After him, from 1868, Carl Mauch prospected for gol .
9/2/253/0004-002	First Gold Power Plant Site, Eersteling, Polokwane District			Polokwane	Provincial Heritage Site	24°07′28″S 29°16′04″E	Upload Photo
9/2/253/0007	Fort Louis Campbell, Marabastad, Polokwane District	This English fort or earthworks is situated just east of the national road at Marabastad, a few kilometres south of Polokwane, on the farm Sand River. The British manned seven forts in the Transvaal during the First Transvaal War of Independence (1880–1881); they were situated at Pretoria, Potchefstroom, Rustenburg, Lydenburg, Wakkerstroom, Standerton and this one at Marabastad. After the Battle of Bron Type of site: Fort.		Polokwane	Provincial Heritage Site	23°59′22″S 29°21′19″E	Upload Photo
9/2/257/0001	Moorddrift Monument, Potgietersrus (Mokopane) District	This simple but important little monument stands under two large camelthorn trees beside the national road 16 km south of Potgietersrust, just where the road used to cross the Nyl River by a drift. It commemorates the murder of a number of settlers in thi One can only guess at the reasons for these tragic events, but it seems that a smouldering feud existed between Chief' Makapan's people and Field-Cornet Potgieter. In September 1854, twenty-eight settler men, women and children met their death in this vi Type of site: Memorial.		Potgietersrus	Provincial Heritage Site	24°16′34″S 28°58′28″E	Upload Photo
9/2/257/0004	Old Stone School, 97 Voortrekker Street, Potgietersrus	Type of site: School.	Potgietersrus	Potgietersrus	Provincial Heritage Site	24°11′14″S 29°00′39″E	Upload Photo
9/2/269/0002	Schoemansdal, Louis Trichardt, Soutpansberg District	In 1848 Zoutpansberg, the most northerly Voortrekker village, was established here by followers of Chief Commandant A. H. Potgieter. The Chief Commandant died and was buried here in 1852. Later the town was named Schoemansdal after Commandant General Step. In 1848 Zoutpansberg, the most northerly Voortrekker village, was established here by followers of Chief Commandant A. H. Potgieter. The Chief Commandant died and was buried here in 1852. Later the town was named Schoemansdal after Commandant General Step		Soutpansberg	Provincial Heritage Site	23°03′09″S 29°46′12″E	Upload Photo
9/2/269/0004	Fosillised Footprints, Pontdrift, Soutpansberg District	These fossilised reptile footprints occur in sandstone where there was a dune in earlier times which was later covered by basalt flows. The animals of tile vicinity presumably fled to the dune where a large number of fossilised prints of various animals a Type of site: Trace fossils. These fossilised reptile footprints occur in sandstone where there was a dune in earlier times which was later covered by basalt flows. The animals of tile vicinity presumably fled to the dune where a large number of fossilised prints of various animals a		Soutpansberg	Provincial Heritage Site	22°12′58″S 29°08′18″E	Upload Photo
9/2/269/0005	Fort Hendrina, Louis Trichardt, Soutpansberg District	This movable iron fort dates from the 19th century and is the only example of its kind to be found in the Transvaal. Type of site: Fort. This movable iron fort dates from the 19th century and is the only example of its kind to be found in the Transvaal.		Soutpansberg	Provincial Heritage Site	23°02′35″S 29°54′31″E	Upload Photo
9/2/269/0011	Stonehenge, Bergvliet, Soutpansberg District	This farmhouse was erected for R. H. Stevens in about 1906 and is allegedly the oldest existing dwelling in the vicinity of Louis Trichardt. This farmhouse was erected for R. H. Stevens in about 1906 and is allegedly the oldest existing dwelling in the vicinity of Louis Trichardt.		Soutpansberg	Provincial Heritage Site	23°01′25″S 29°53′53″E	Upload Photo
9/2/269/0023	Lake Fundudzi, Ndzelele			Vhembe district		22°51′05″S 30°18′33″E	
9/2/280/0004	Blockhouse, Paul Sauer Road, Warmbaths	After the surrender of Pretoria in the Anglo-Boer War, the Republican forces adopted guerilla tactics. Built by the British authorities during the Anglo-Boer War to protect the railway from destruction by the Boers, it formed a part of a formidable line o Type of site: Blockhouse. After the surrender of Pretoria on the Anglo-Boer War, the Republican forces adopted guerilla tactics. To counter this the British forces erected a system of blockhouses to divide the combat areas into sectors. This blockhouse was part of one of the most	Warmbaths	Warmbaths	Provincial Heritage Site	24°53′14″S 28°17′57″E	Upload Photo
9/2/281/0003	Old Reformed Church, Nylstroom	The historic old church building of the Waterberg Reformed Church was built in 1889 and was taken into use on 23 November of that year. President Paul Kruger of the Zuid-Afrikaansche Republiek was present on this occasion. During the Anglo-Boer War a wing Type of site: Church. The historic old church building of the Waterberg Reformed Church was built in 1889 and was taken into use on 23 November of that year. President Paul Kruger of the Zuid-Afrikaansche Republiek was present on this occasion. During the Anglo-Boer War a wing	Nylstroom	Waterberg	Provincial Heritage Site	24°42′04″S 28°24′13″E	Upload Photo
9/2/281/0004	Strijdom House, Nylstroom	Advocate J. G. Strijdom, Prime Minister of South Africa from 1954 to 1958, lived in this house. The house was designed by Gerhard Moerdyk and is in the neo-Cape- Dutch style. Advocate J. G. Strijdom, Prime Minister of South Africa from 1954 to 1958, lived in this house. The house was designed by Gerhard Moerdyk and is in the neo-Cape- Dutch style.	Nylstroom	Waterberg	Provincial Heritage Site	24°42′03″S 28°24′10″E	Upload Photo
