= Kurper =

Kurper is a generic name for certain fish in South Africa. It may refer to:

- Blue Kurper (Oreochromis mossambicus) or (Oreochromis aureus)
- Cape Kurper (Sandelia capensis)
- Rocky Kurper (Sandelia bainsii)
- Vlei Kurper (Tilapia sparrmanii)
- Redbreast Kurper (Tilapia rendalli)
- Canary Kurper (Chetia flaviventris)
- Olyf Kurper (Serranochromis Robustus)
