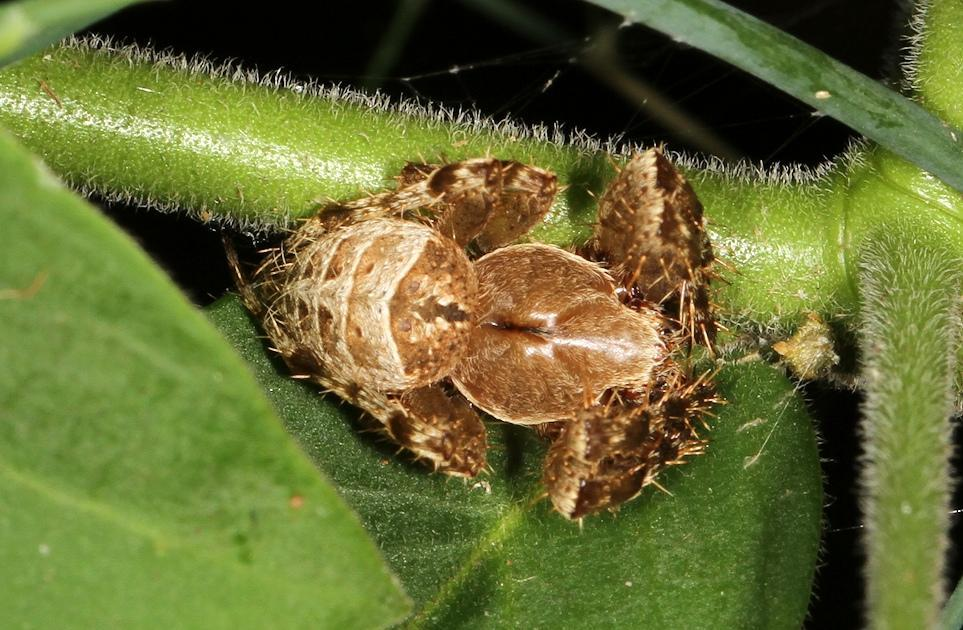

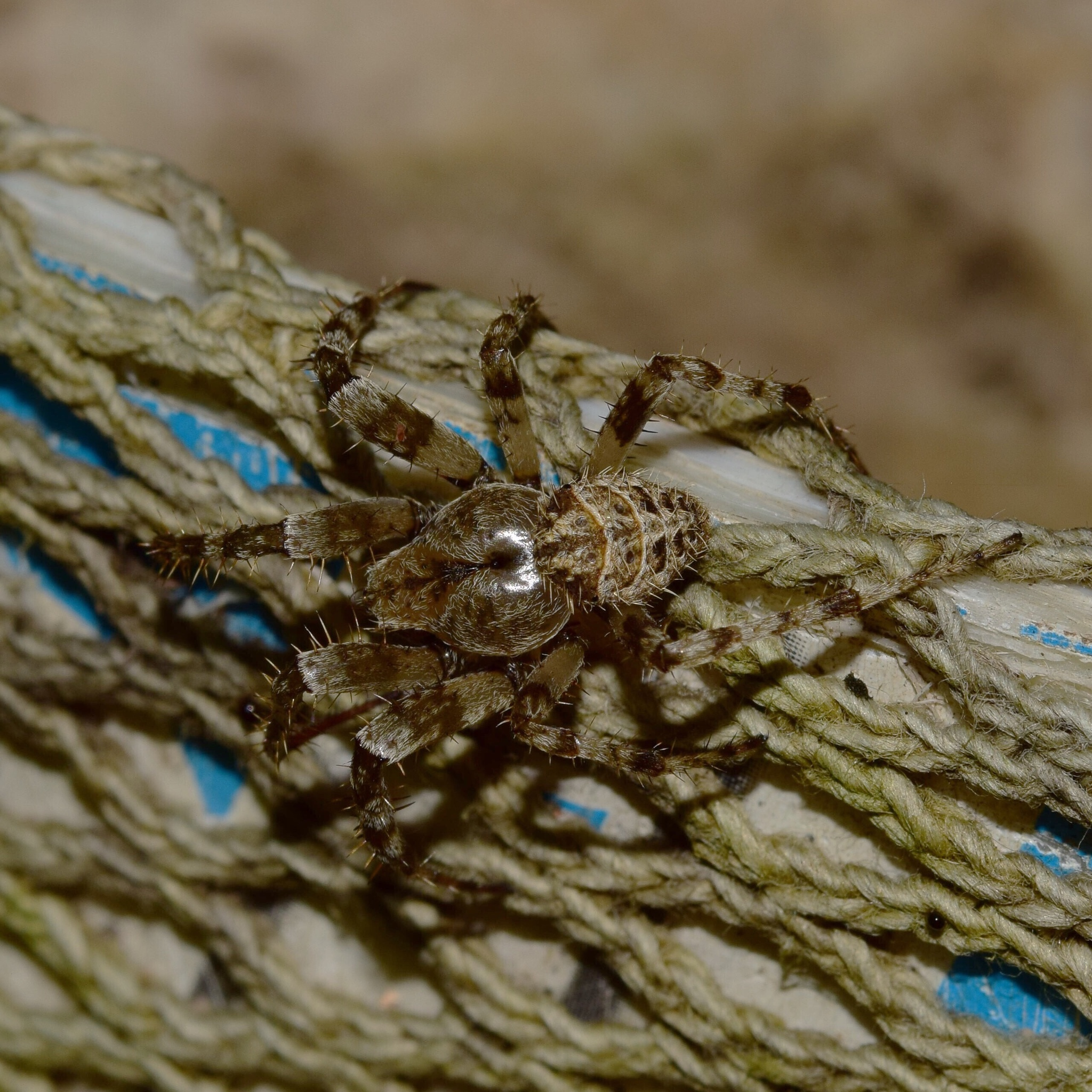

Conservation status
- Least Concern (SANBI Red List)

Scientific classification
- Kingdom: Animalia
- Phylum: Arthropoda
- Subphylum: Chelicerata
- Class: Arachnida
- Order: Araneae
- Infraorder: Araneomorphae
- Family: Araneidae
- Genus: Pararaneus
- Species: P. perforatus

Binomial name
- Pararaneus perforatus (Thorell, 1899)

= Pararaneus perforatus =

Spiky Field Spider

Species of spider

Pararaneus perforatus is a species of spider in the family Araneidae. It is commonly known as the spiky field spider and is an African endemic species.

== Distribution ==
Pararaneus perforatus is an African endemic species originally described in 1899 as Aranea perforata from Cameroon. The species is also known from the Democratic Republic of the Congo, Somalia, Namibia, and South Africa.

In South Africa, the species is recorded only from the Eastern Cape province, with records from Addo Elephant National Park and Bathurst.

== Habitat and ecology ==
The species is an orb-weaver with webs made in the field layer. The mature spider makes a typical vertical orb-web while the immature spiders make a horizontal web with a defective frame that is cone-shaped with threads pulling the hub out of the plane of the frame. The species is commonly sampled with a sweep net from the Thicket biome.

== Description ==
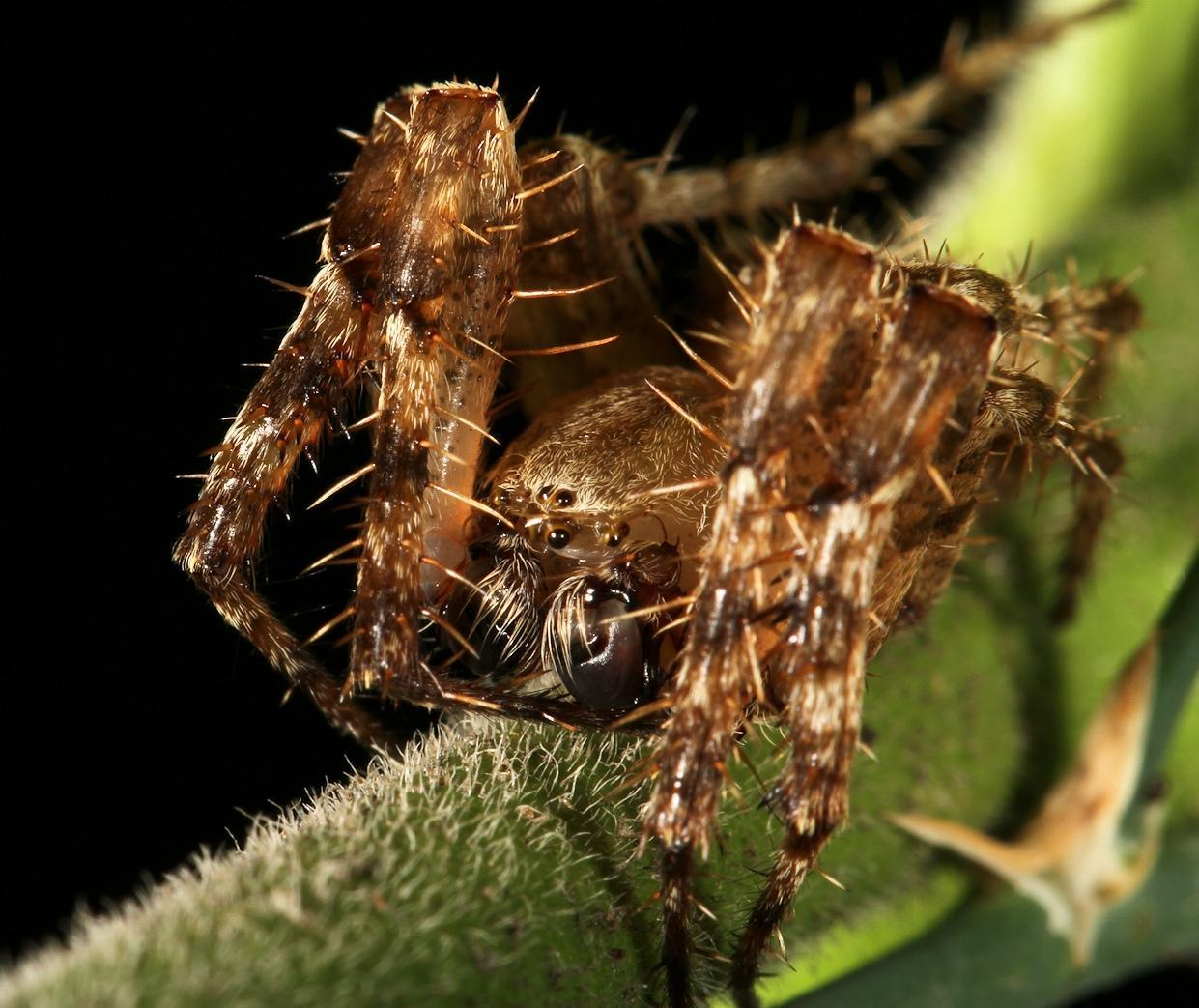

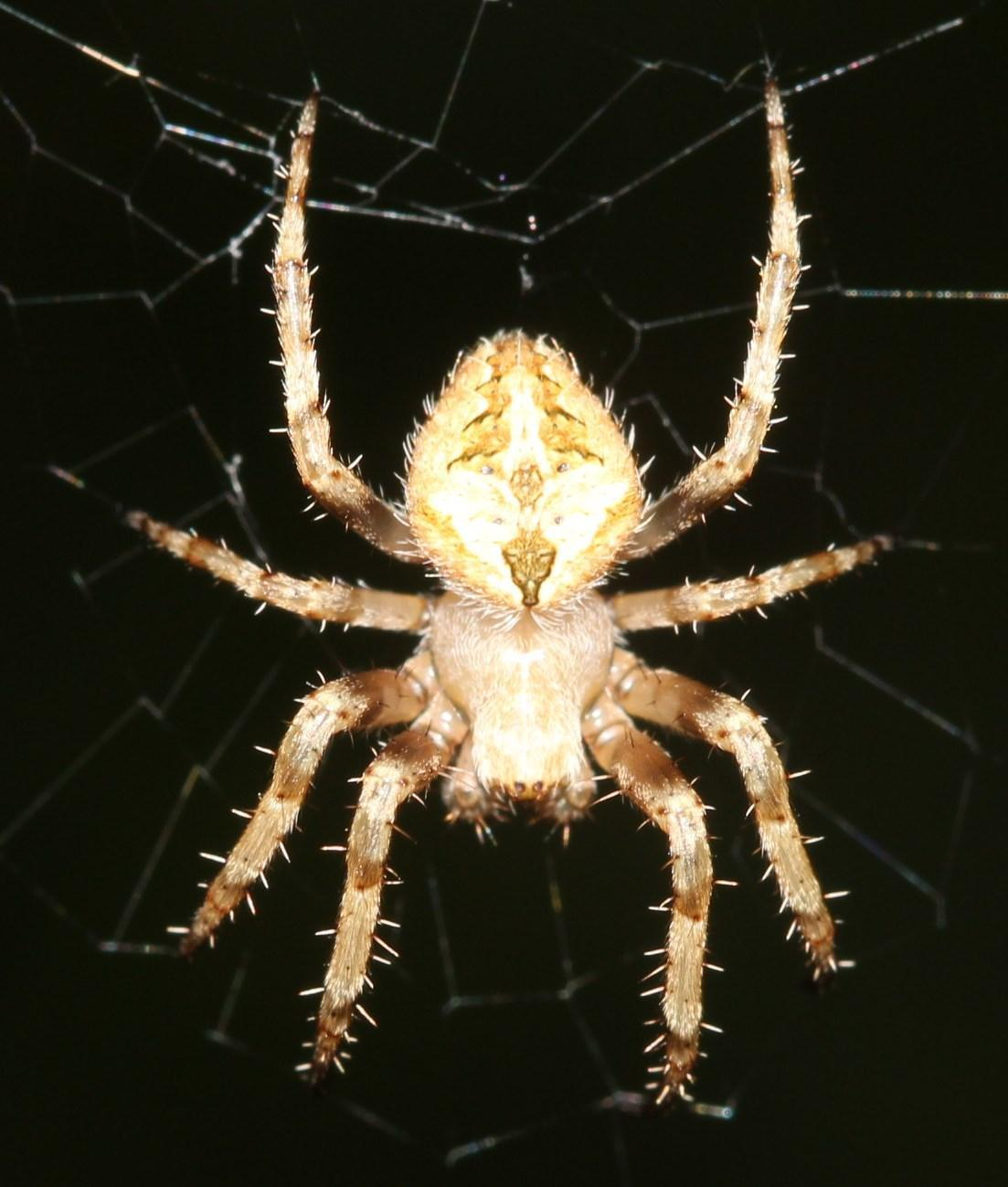

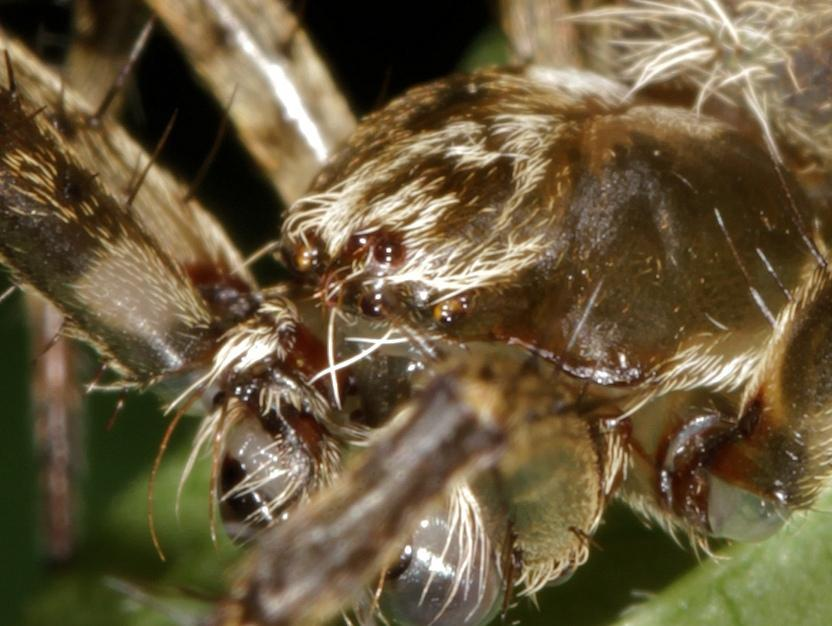

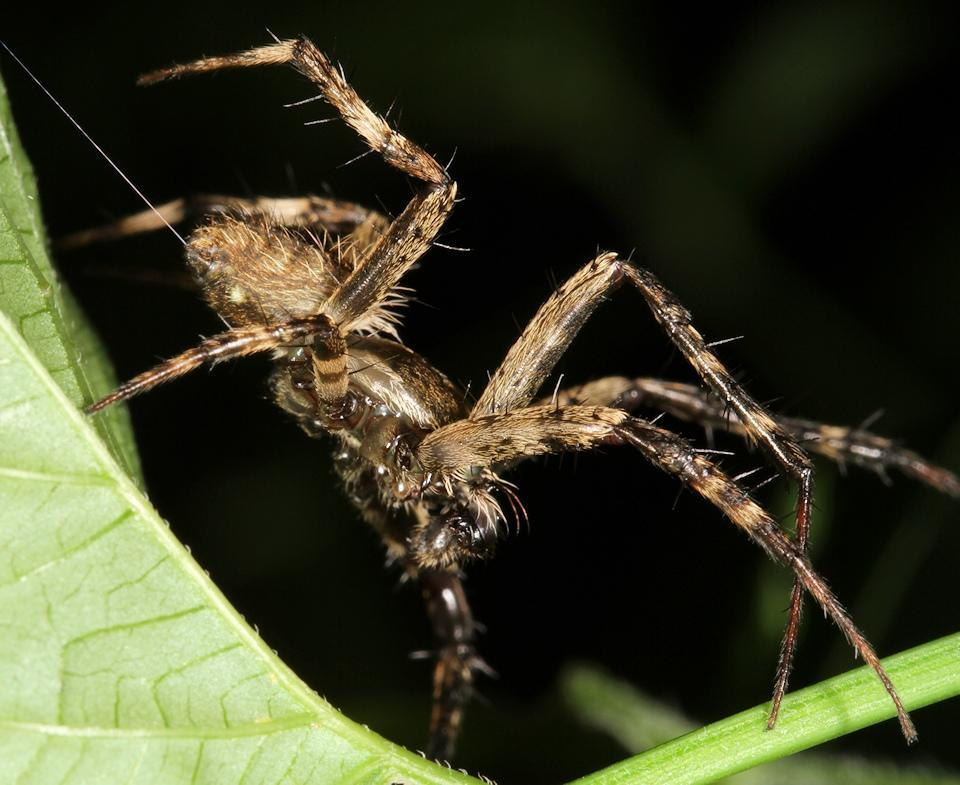

== Conservation ==
Pararaneus perforatus is listed as Least Concern by the South African National Biodiversity Institute due to its wide global geographical range. The species is protected in the Addo Elephant National Park. There are no significant threats to the species.

== Taxonomy ==
The species was originally described by Tamerlan Thorell in 1899 as Aranea perforata from Cameroon. It was later transferred to the genus Pararaneus. The species has been revised by Grasshoff (1986) and is known from both sexes.
