= Blaauwkrantz Pass =

Mountain pass on the R67 in the Eastern Cape

- Location in the Eastern Cape. The pass traverses the Blaauwkrantz Nature Reserve, between Grahamstown and Port Alfred
- Traversed by: R67

Third Approach
- Coordinates: 33.3849178°S 26.7045306°E
- Blaauwkrantz Pass (South Africa) Blaauwkrantz Pass (Eastern Cape)

Blaauwkrantz Pass is a mountain pass on the R67, situated across the Blaauwkrantz Nature Reserve in the Eastern Cape, on the road between Grahamstown and Port Alfred. It traverses the Bloukrans River valley.

== History ==
Nearby was the site of the Blaauwkrantz Bridge disaster of 1911.
