= Blaauwkrantz Nature Reserve =

Nature reserve in the Eastern Cape

- IUCN category IV (habitat/species management area)
- Nearest city: Makhanda (Grahamstown)
- Coordinates: 33°23′23″S 26°42′32″E
- Area: 198.31 ha (490.0 acres)
- Created: 1 February 1985; 41 years ago
- Blaauwkrantz Nature Reserve (South Africa) Blaauwkrantz Nature Reserve (Eastern Cape)

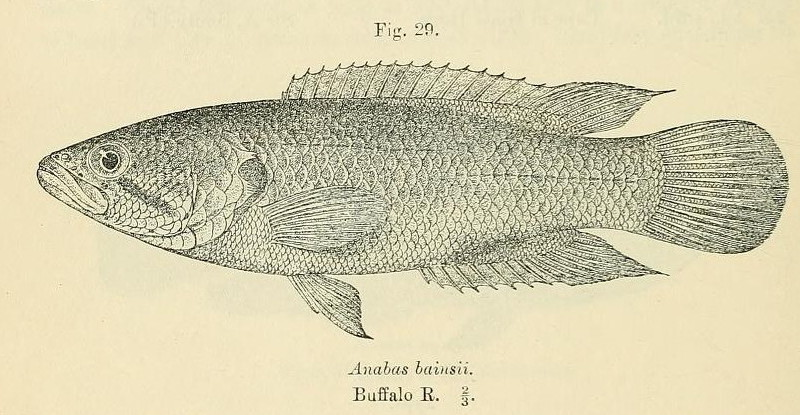
Eastern Province rocky found in the reserve

The Blaauwkrantz Nature Reserve is a small protected area near Makhanda (Grahamstown) designated for the purpose of conserving the endangered Eastern Province rocky. Nearby are the Waters Meeting Nature Reserve and Buffalo Kloof Protected Environment. The Blaauwkrantz Pass (R67) runs along the length of the reserve, while the Bloukrans River bisects it horizontally.

== History ==
In 1985, 198.31 ha of land was proclaimed for the conservation of the endangered Eastern Province rocky.

== Biodiversity ==
The reserve, consisting of veld vegetation, has over 200 plant species including aloe and tree euphorbia. The Blaauwkrantz Pool in the reserve is one of the last refuges of the endemic Eastern Province rocky (rocky kurper). Birds found on the reserve are fish eagle and kingfisher. Otters can also be found in the reserve.

== Threats ==
The Blaauwkrantz Pool, containing the rocky kurper, faces a number of threats from sewage treatment to agricultural practises like the leaching of fertilisers upstream into the river which lead to the excessive growth of the invasive red water fern that cover the water. This prevents plankton (which require sunlight in order to survive) from growing which is a source of food for young rocky kurpers.

== See also ==
- List of protected areas of South Africa
