= Kowie River =

River in the Eastern Cape, South Africa

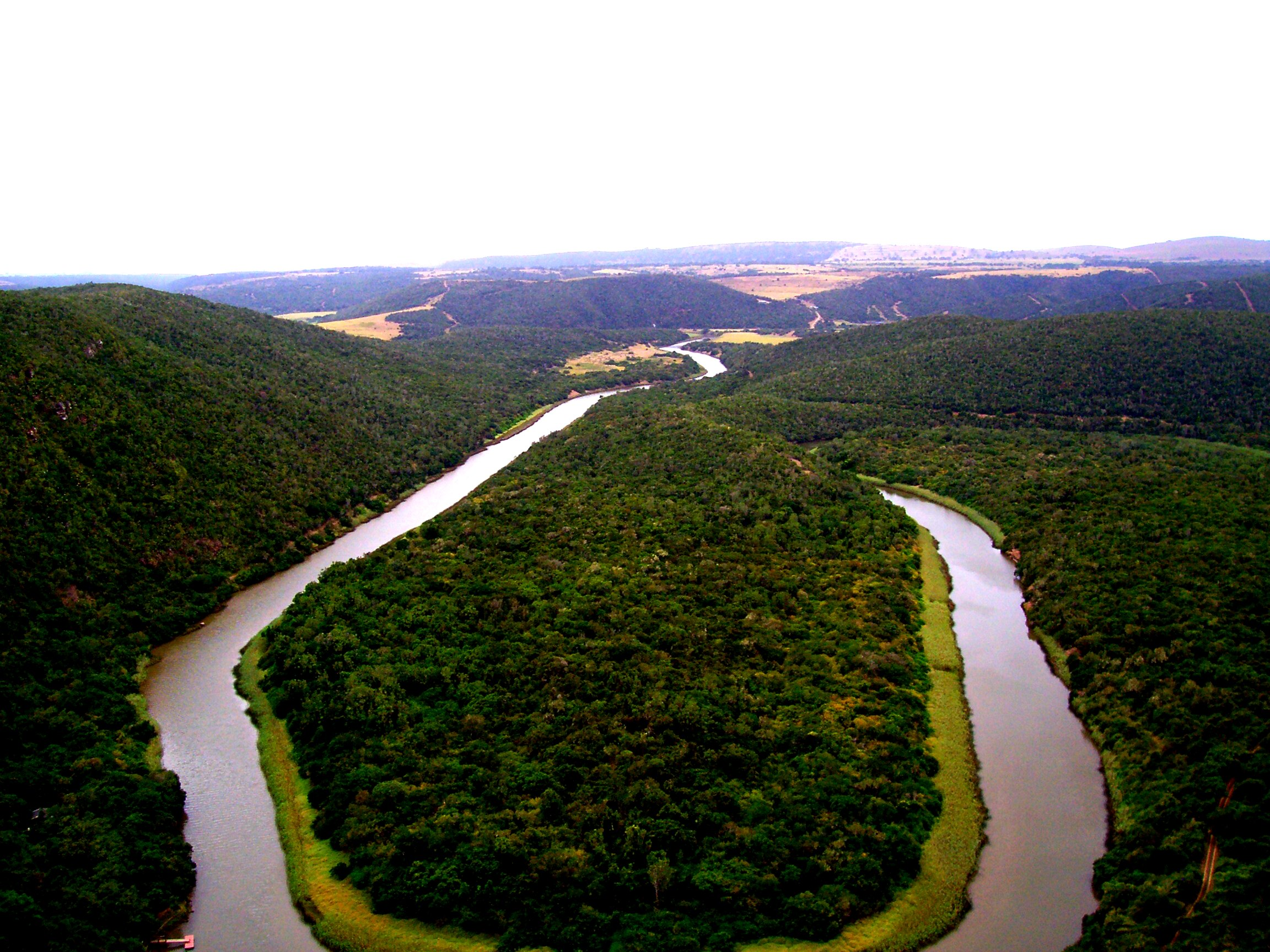
- The Kowie River near Bathurst

- Location of the Kowie River mouth
- Native name: Coyi (Xhosa)

Location
- Country: South Africa
- Province: Eastern Cape

Physical characteristics
- Mouth: Indian Ocean
  - location: Port Alfred
  - coordinates: 33°36′06″S 26°53′58″E
  - elevation: 0 m (0 ft)
- Length: 94 km (58 mi)
- Basin size: 800 km^{2} (310 sq mi)

The Kowie River (Coyi in Xhosa) is a river in the Eastern Cape, South Africa. It has its source in the hills of the "Grahamstown Heights" from where it flows in a south-easterly direction draining the major part of the Bathurst region, reaching the Indian Ocean through an estuary at Port Alfred.

Its major tributaries are the Bloukrans River, the Bak River and the Lushington River (or Torrens). The Little Kowie River is a smaller tributary which enters the estuarine portion of the river 14 km from the mouth. There are also a number of smaller unnamed streams entering the river along its course. The Kowie river is part of the Fish to Tsitsikama Water Management Area.

== Ecology ==
There is a small population of the endangered Eastern Province rocky (Sandelia bainsii) in the Bloukrans River section of the Blaauwkrantz Nature Reserve.

== See also ==
- List of rivers of South Africa
- List of reservoirs and dams in South Africa
