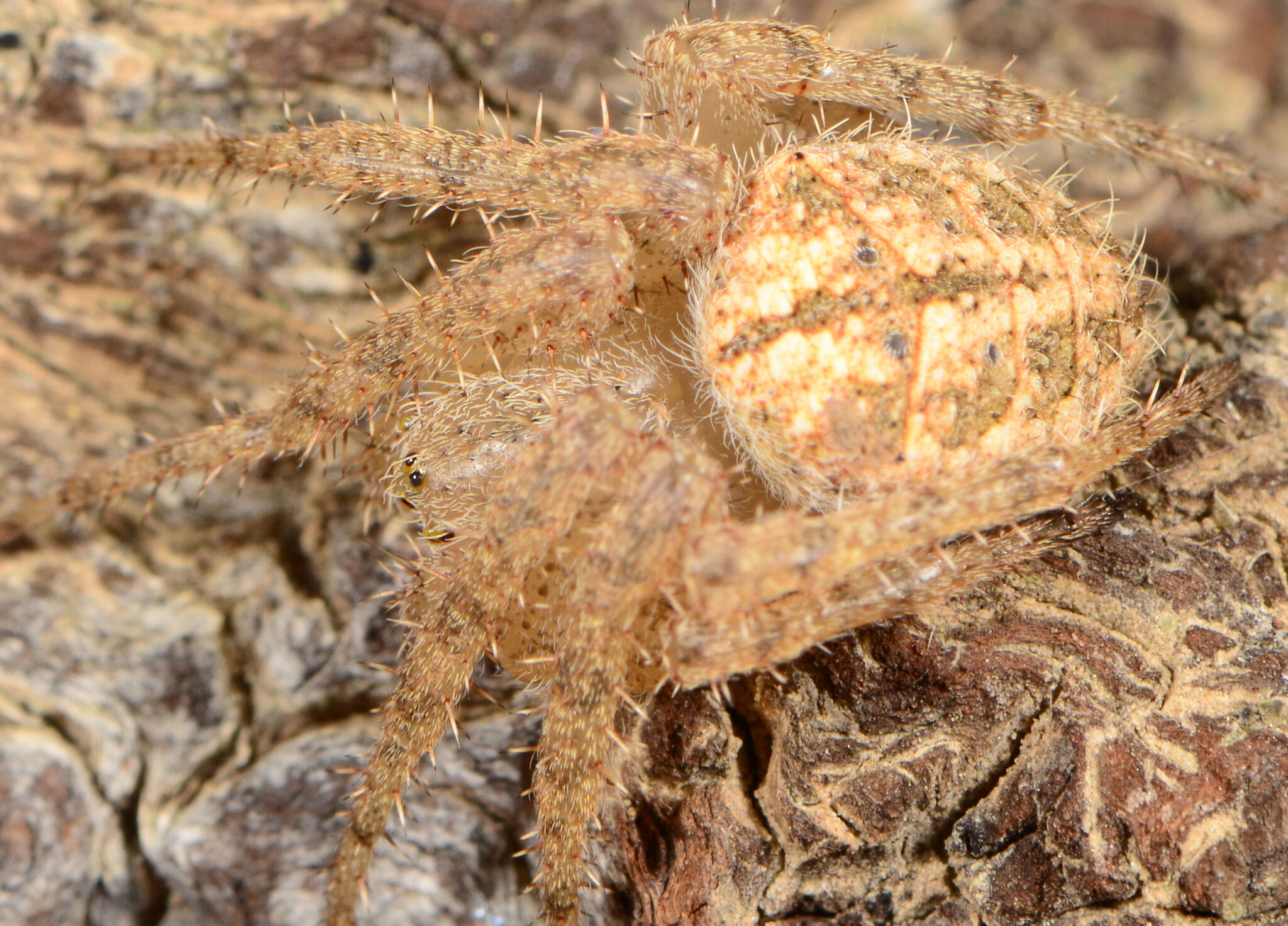
- Female
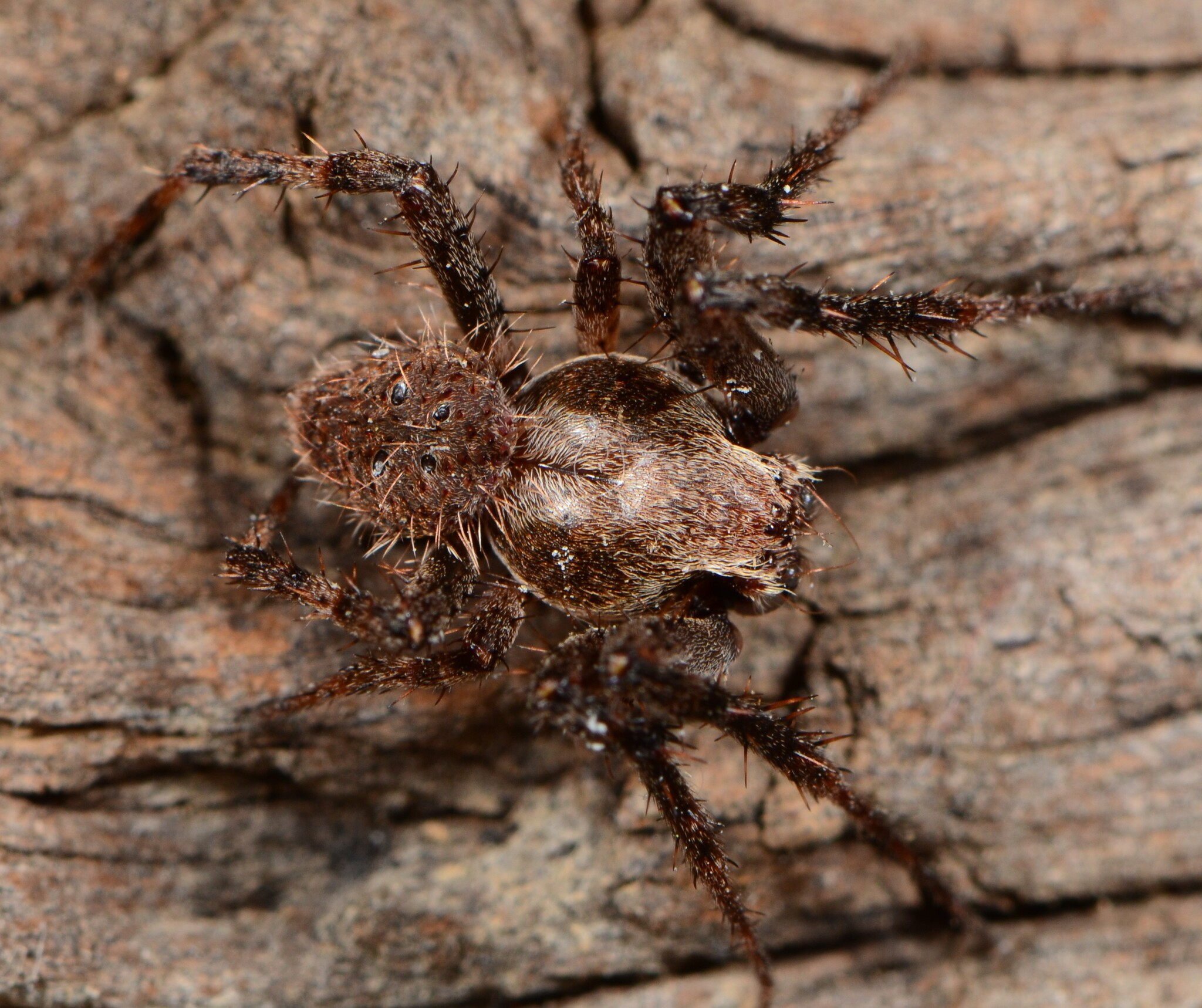
- Male

Scientific classification
- Kingdom: Animalia
- Phylum: Arthropoda
- Subphylum: Chelicerata
- Class: Arachnida
- Order: Araneae
- Infraorder: Araneomorphae
- Family: Araneidae
- Genus: Pararaneus
- Species: P. cyrtoscapus

Binomial name
- Pararaneus cyrtoscapus (Pocock, 1898)

= Pararaneus cyrtoscapus =

Spiky Field Spider

Species of spider

Pararaneus cyrtoscapus is a species of spider in the family Araneidae. It is commonly known as the spiky field spider and is an African endemic species.

== Distribution ==
Pararaneus cyrtoscapus is an African endemic species originally described in 1898 as Araneus cyrtoscapus from the type locality Estcourt in South Africa. The species has also been collected from six other African countries including Botswana, Ethiopia, Kenya, Malawi, Socotra, and Zimbabwe.

In South Africa, the species is known from eight provinces and occurs in more than 10 protected areas at altitudes ranging from 1 to 1,593 m above sea level. The species has a widespread distribution across the country, with records from Eastern Cape, Free State, Gauteng, KwaZulu-Natal, Limpopo, Mpumalanga, North West, and Western Cape provinces.

== Habitat and ecology ==
The species is an orb-weaver with webs made in the field layer. The mature spider makes a typical vertical orb-web while the immature spiders make a horizontal web with a defective frame that is cone-shaped with threads pulling the hub out of the plane of the frame. The species is commonly sampled with a sweep net from the Fynbos, Forest, Grassland, Nama Karoo, Savanna and Thicket biomes. It has also been sampled from avocado, citrus and pistachio orchards and tomato fields.

== Description ==
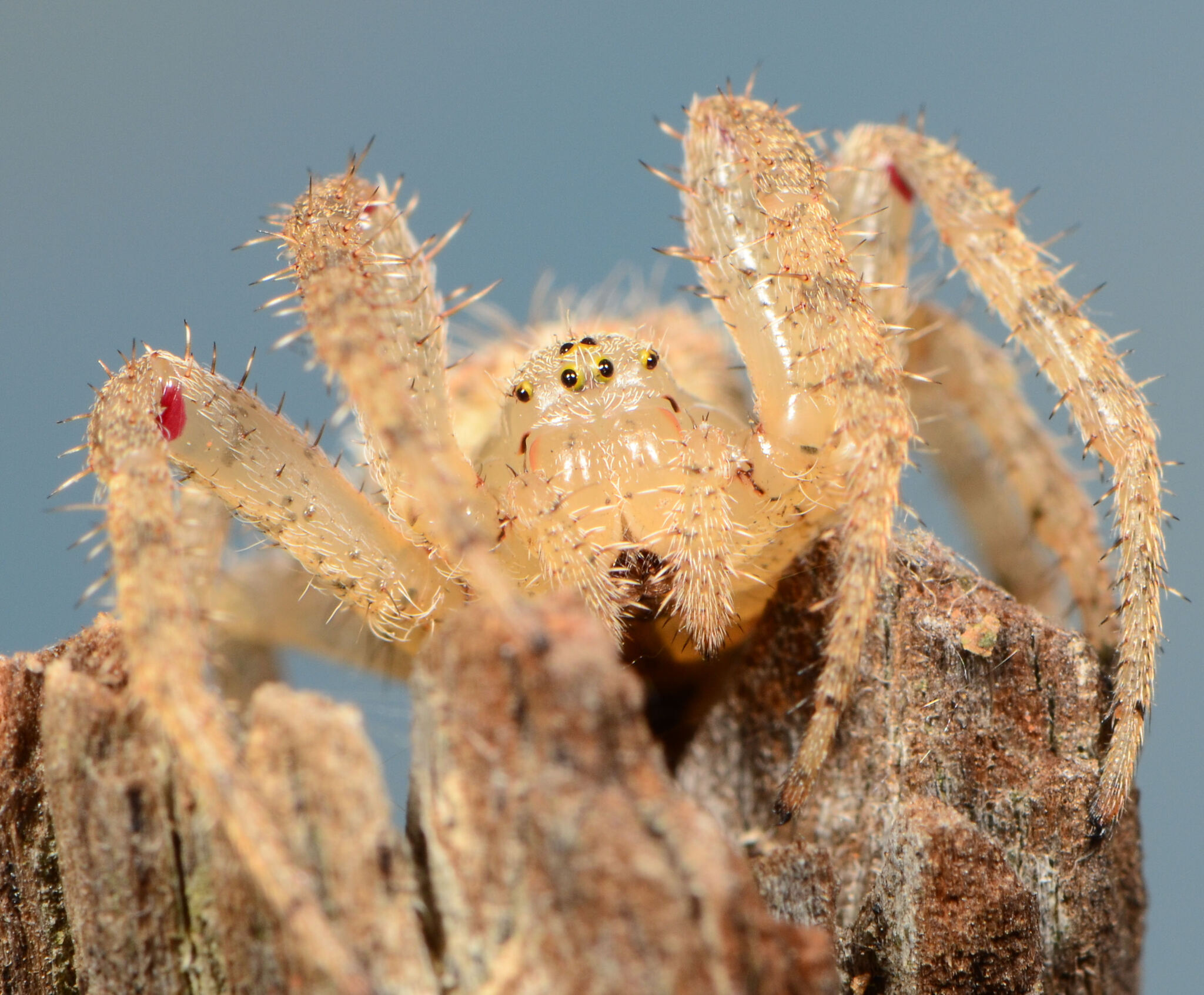
female

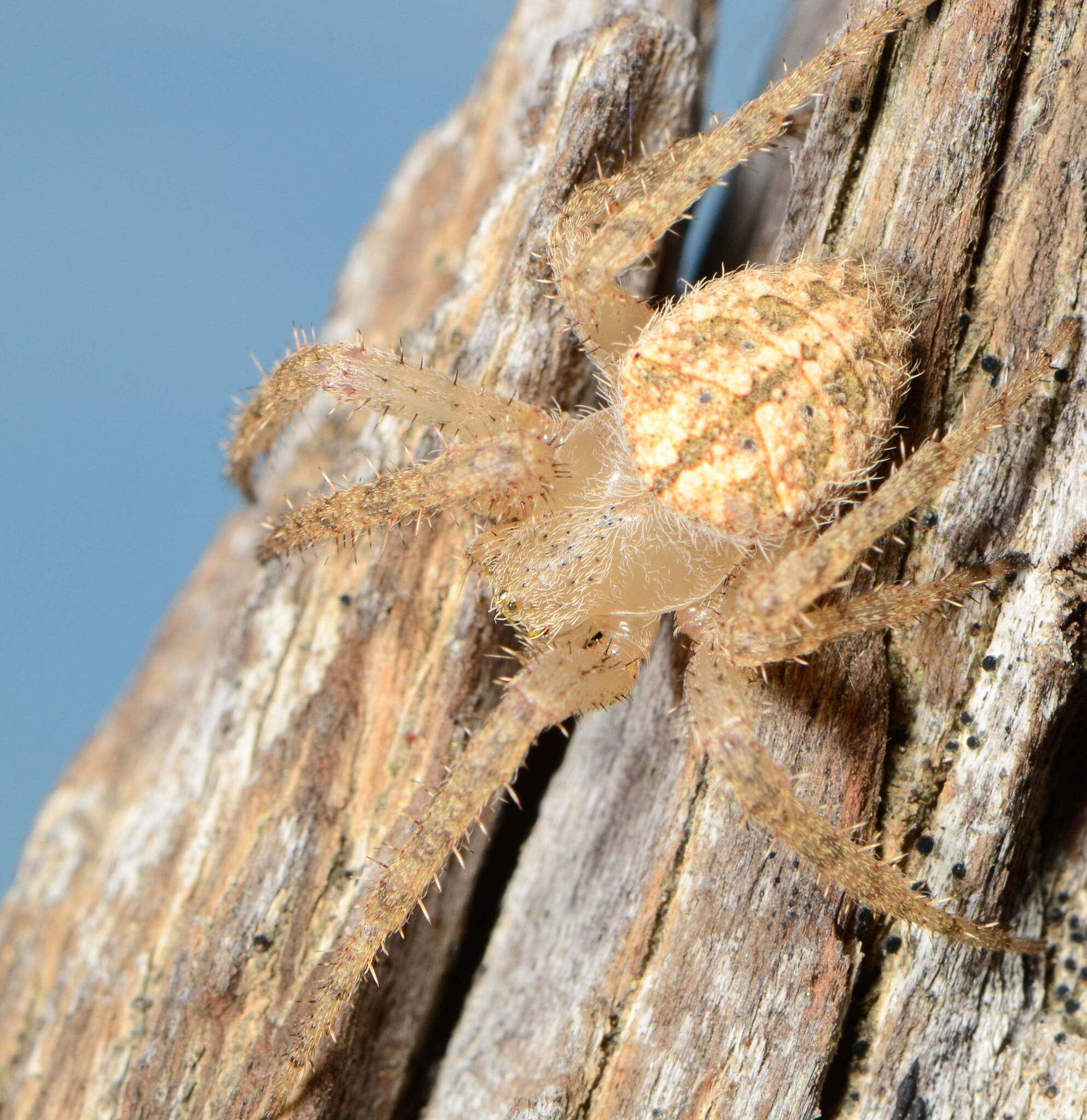
female

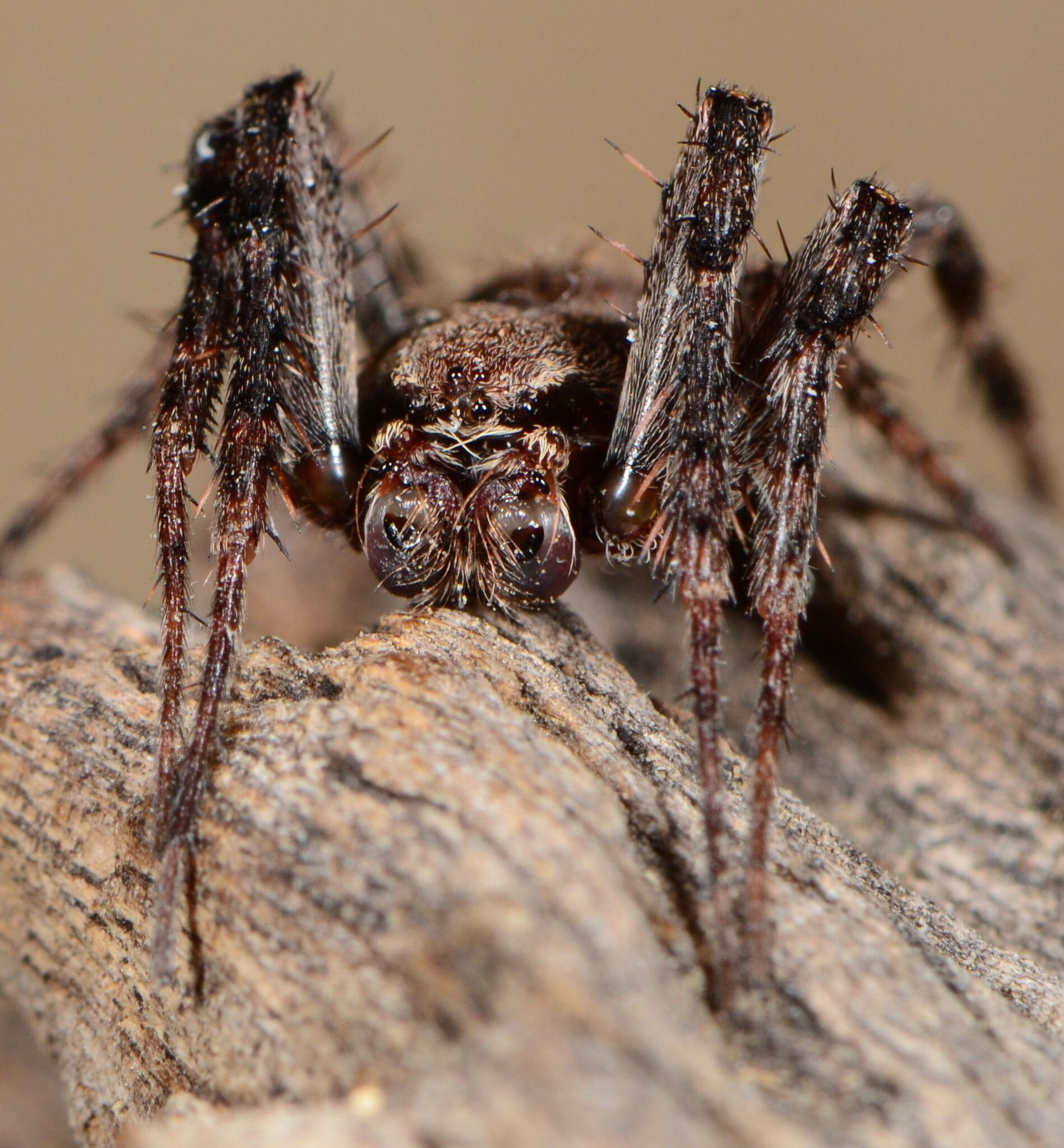
male

== Conservation ==
Pararaneus cyrtoscapus is listed as Least Concern by the South African National Biodiversity Institute due to its wide geographical range. The species is protected in more than 13 protected areas. There are no significant threats to the species.

== Taxonomy ==
The species was originally described by Reginald Innes Pocock in 1898 as Araneus cyrtoscapus from Estcourt in South Africa. It was later transferred to the genus Pararaneus. The species has been revised by Grasshoff (1986) and is known from both sexes.
