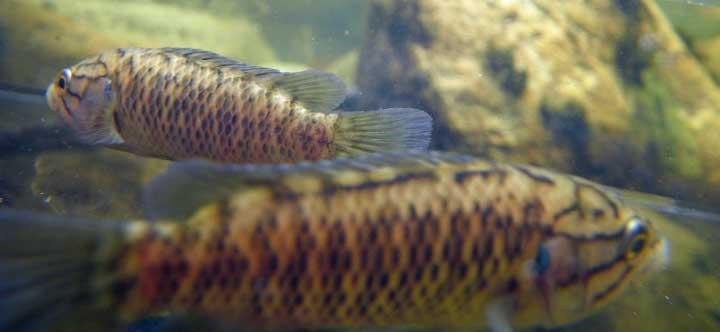
- S. capensis from the Breede catchment

Scientific classification
- Kingdom: Animalia
- Phylum: Chordata
- Class: Actinopterygii
- Division: Teleostei
- Order: Anabantiformes
- Family: Anabantidae
- Genus: Sandelia; Castelnau, 1861

Type species
- Sandelia bainsii Castelnau, 1861
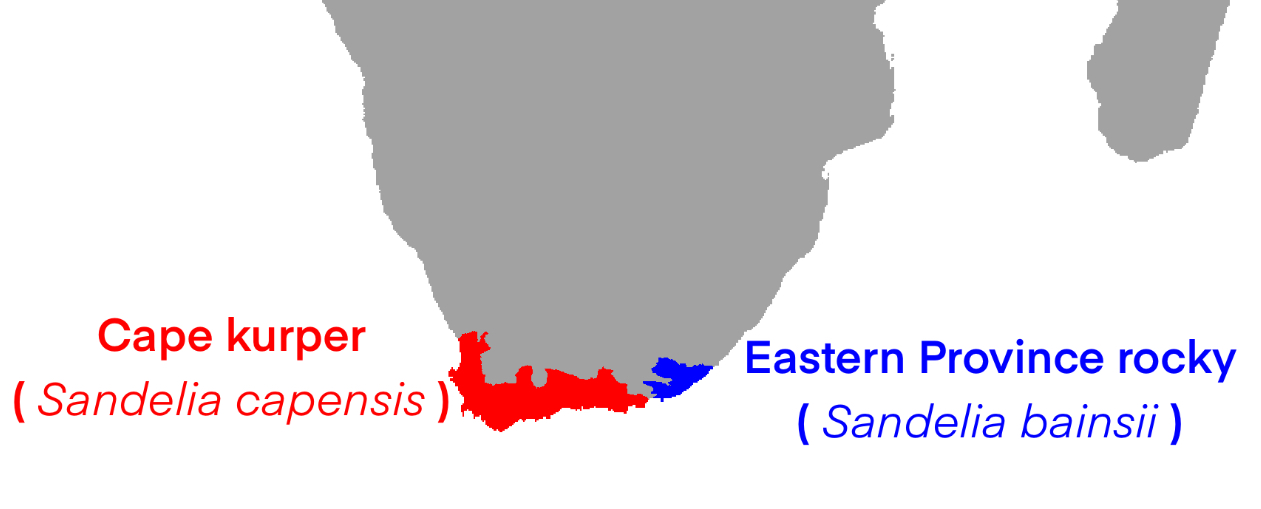

= Sandelia =

Genus of fishes

Sandelia is a genus of climbing gouramies native to freshwater habitats in South Africa.

== Species ==
There are currently two recognized species in this genus:

- Sandelia bainsii Castelnau, 1861 (Rocky kurper)
- Sandelia capensis (G. Cuvier, 1829) (Cape kurper)
