= Blaauwkrantz Bridge disaster =

1911 railway incident in South Africa

Coordinates: 33°21′31.52″S 26°43′10.30″E

- The solitary truck on the bridge after the accident (Grocott's Mail, 1911)

Details
- Date: 22 April 1911
- Location: Blaauwkrantz Pass
- Country: South Africa
- Operator: Kowie Railway Company
- Incident type: Derailment

Statistics
- Trains: 1
- Passengers: 55
- Deaths: 28
- Injured: 22

The Blaauwkrantz Bridge disaster occurred on 22 April 1911. A mixed train from Port Alfred travelling to Grahamstown, made up of six goods trucks, three passenger carriages and a guard's van, came to grief when one of the goods trucks derailed on the Blaauwkrantz Bridge over the Blaauwkrantz Pass and, with the three carriages and the guard's van, plunged into the ravine 200 feet (61 metres) below. Of the 55 passengers, 28 were killed and 22 seriously injured.

Some 200 metres (660 ft) before reaching the bridge a truck left the rails, near the centre of the bridge the truck, which was carrying stone to build the Grahamstown Cathedral, turned over and broke the necks of the buffers which detached it from the front of the train. The sudden impact of the rear coaches against the overturned truck caused them to topple over the side of the bridge and turn somersault before being dashed to pieces on the rocks below. A carriage roof, a door and a lampholder were detached in the fall and were found hanging on the side of the bridge.

Conveying the injured in stretchers from the Grahamstown railway station to the Albany General Hospital (Grocott's Mail, 1911)

The locomotive had made it to the other side of the bridge without damage, and so the engine driver raced the locomotive to Grahamstown to get help.

== Fatalities ==
The following persons were killed in the disaster:

- Mr. J Lewis-Smith, an attendant at Fort England Asylum
- Mrs. J. Lewis-Smith and baby, wife of the above
- Mrs. Smith’s son Willie, aged 3, succumbed to injuries three days later
- Mrs. H.J. Moolman, widow of Dr. Moolman, Commadagga, daughter of Judge Hopley
- Miss Mary Moolman, Commadagga
- Mr. Adolphus H. Wright, law agent, Grahamstown. He was a cousin of the late Dr. Greathead and grandson of the late Mrs. Wright who built and endowed Christ Church. He leaves a widow and a numerous family.
- Mr. James Forsyth, Grahamstown. Was confidential clerk to Rosenbaum Lax & Co and much respected son of Mr. William Forsyth. The deceased gentleman was at one time a schoolmaster at West Bank, East London, and went through the Langberg [sic] Campaign as a volunteer. He leaves a widow and three little daughters.
- Mr. Clifford W. Dold was the well-known feather broker, Grahamstown
- Mrs. Clifford Dold, Grahamstown and her three children, May, Cyril and Vincent
- Mr. C.E. Dell of Kei Road
- Mrs. Edward Dell of Kei Road.
- Mr. J. Grant, Commercial traveler for Rolfes, Nebel & Co. Port Elizabeth
- Mr. Arnold, Bathurst
- Mrs. Cyril Bishop and her baby, Umtata
- Miss Mildred Sherwood, daughter of an attendant at Fort England Asylum, Grahamstown
- Miss Kathleen Hope Brereton, daughter of the Rev. A.W. Brereton, Registrar of Rhodes University College, Grahamstown.
- Mr. David Hulley
- Mr. Charlton Richardson
- Mr. Paul Tarr, a well-known man, formerly proprietor of a boarding house in Market Square, Grahamstown
- Mrs. Cooper
- Miss Maggie Arnold
- Mrs C.W. Dold’s nurse Mobald
