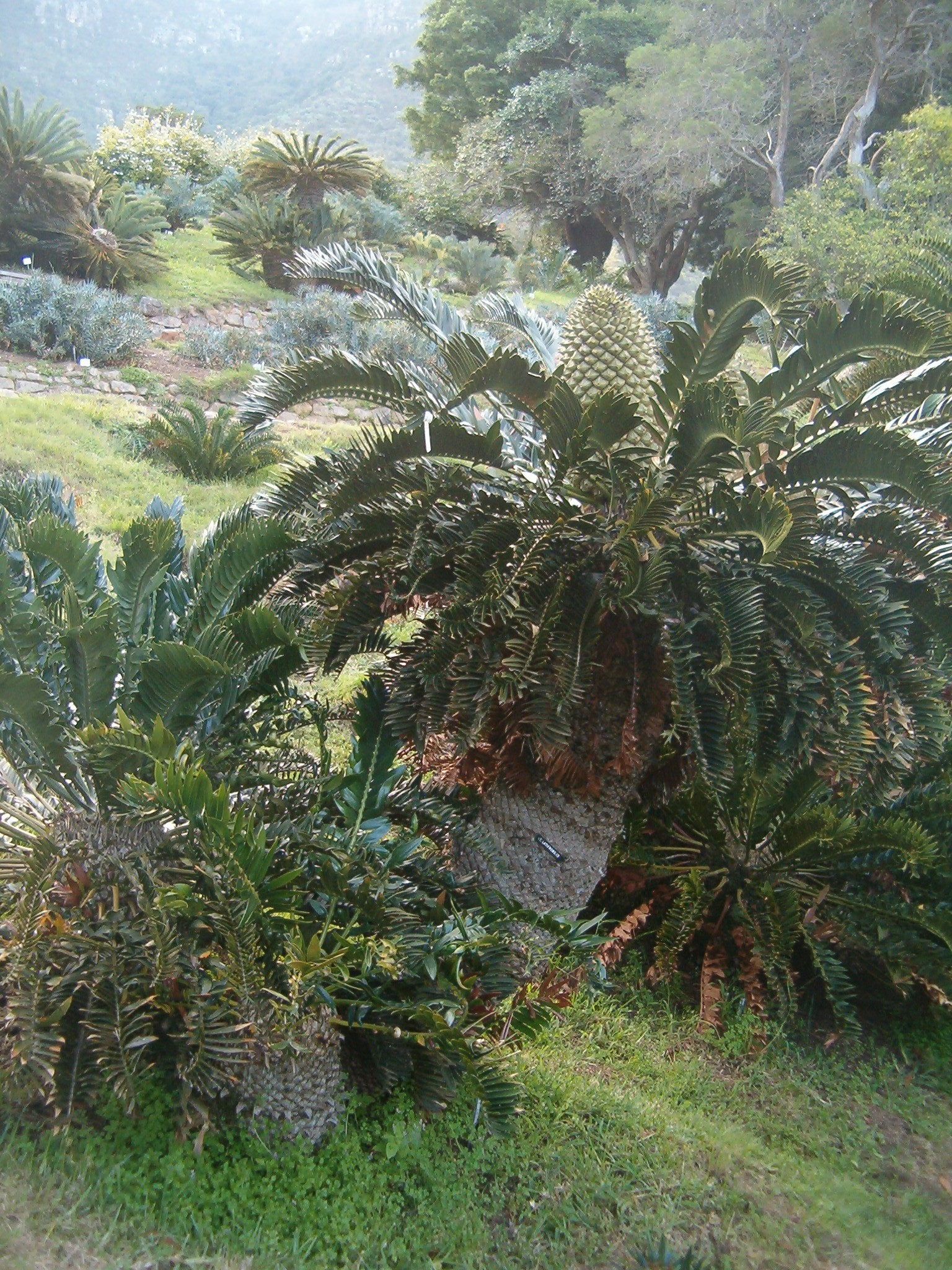
- Encephalartos latifrons at Kirstenbosch National Botanical Garden

Conservation status
- Critically Endangered (IUCN 3.1)
- CITES Appendix I (CITES)

Scientific classification
- Kingdom: Plantae
- Clade: Tracheophytes
- Clade: Gymnospermae
- Division: Cycadophyta
- Class: Cycadopsida
- Order: Cycadales
- Family: Zamiaceae
- Genus: Encephalartos
- Species: E. latifrons

Binomial name
- Encephalartos latifrons Lehm.
- Albany Cycad (Encephalartos latifrons) distribution

Synonyms
- Encephalartos horridus var. latifrons (Lehm.) J.Schust.

= Encephalartos latifrons =

Species of cycad

Encephalartos latifrons is a very rare species of cycad, known as the Albany Cycad, in the family Zamiaceae. It is native to Eastern Cape province in South Africa at elevations of 200 and 600 m (660–1,970 ft).

== Description ==
This is a tall, tree-like cycad plant with a stem that can be upright or lying down, reaching up to 4.5 m (15 ft) in height and 30 and 45 cm (12–18 in) in diameter. Its bright green, feather-like leaves grow in a cluster at the top of the trunk, each leaf being 1–1.5 m (3.3–4.9 ft) long and supported by a 10–20 cm (4–8 in) long stalk that curves downward. The leaves are made up of many pairs of large, leathery leaflets, each up to 15 cm (6 in) long, arranged at a sharp angle along the central leaf spine, partially overlapping, and with the lower edges having 3-4 triangular lobes. This plant is dioecious, meaning it has separate male and female specimens. Male plants have 1-3 short, cylindrical cones that are about 30–50 cm (12–20 in) long and 8–17 cm (3.1–6.7 in) wide, olive-green in color. Female plants have 1-3 upright, cylindrical cones that are about 50–60 cm (20–24 in) long and 23–25 cm (9–10 in) wide, also olive green, with macrosporophylls about 8 cm (3 in) long. The seeds are roughly egg-shaped, 2.5–3.0 cm (1.0–1.2 in) long, and covered with dark red sarcotesta.

== Habitat and distribution ==
E. latifrons occurs (or, more correctly, used to occur) in scattered groups in the districts of Bathurst and Albany in the Eastern Cape province. The plants grow on rocky outcrops and hill slopes, usually amongst scrub bush vegetation. The rainfall ranges from 1000mm to 1250mm per year, on average, and is fairly evenly distributed during the year. Frost does not occur. Summers may be hot and fairly dry. There existed an early report of E. latifrons occurring in the Uitenhage district, but this was almost certainly a mistake, possibly as a result of incorrect labelling.

== Conservation ==
In August 2014, thirteen Encephalartos latifrons cycads were stolen from Kirstenbosch Botanical Gardens in Cape Town, South Africa. The estimated value of all thirteen was at least R200,000 (US18,675). The plants were planted over 100 years ago as part of a research and reproduction programme of this particular species of Encephalartos that no longer naturally reproduces in the wild. Encephalartos is highly valued as a garden or ornamental plant in many parts of the world and it is thought the plants were stolen to be sold on the black market.

== Threats ==
Today Encephalartos latifrons only exists in areas used for pineapple and chicory farming and livestock rearing. Historical photos indicate the disappearance of plants at several sites by 1996, possibly due to land use changes. The primary threat to the species is the trade in cycads, driven by its rarity. The removal of mature plants is a significant risk, as the species heavily relies on adult survival, and the extinction of natural pollinators and a lack of recent seed production add to its challenges.
