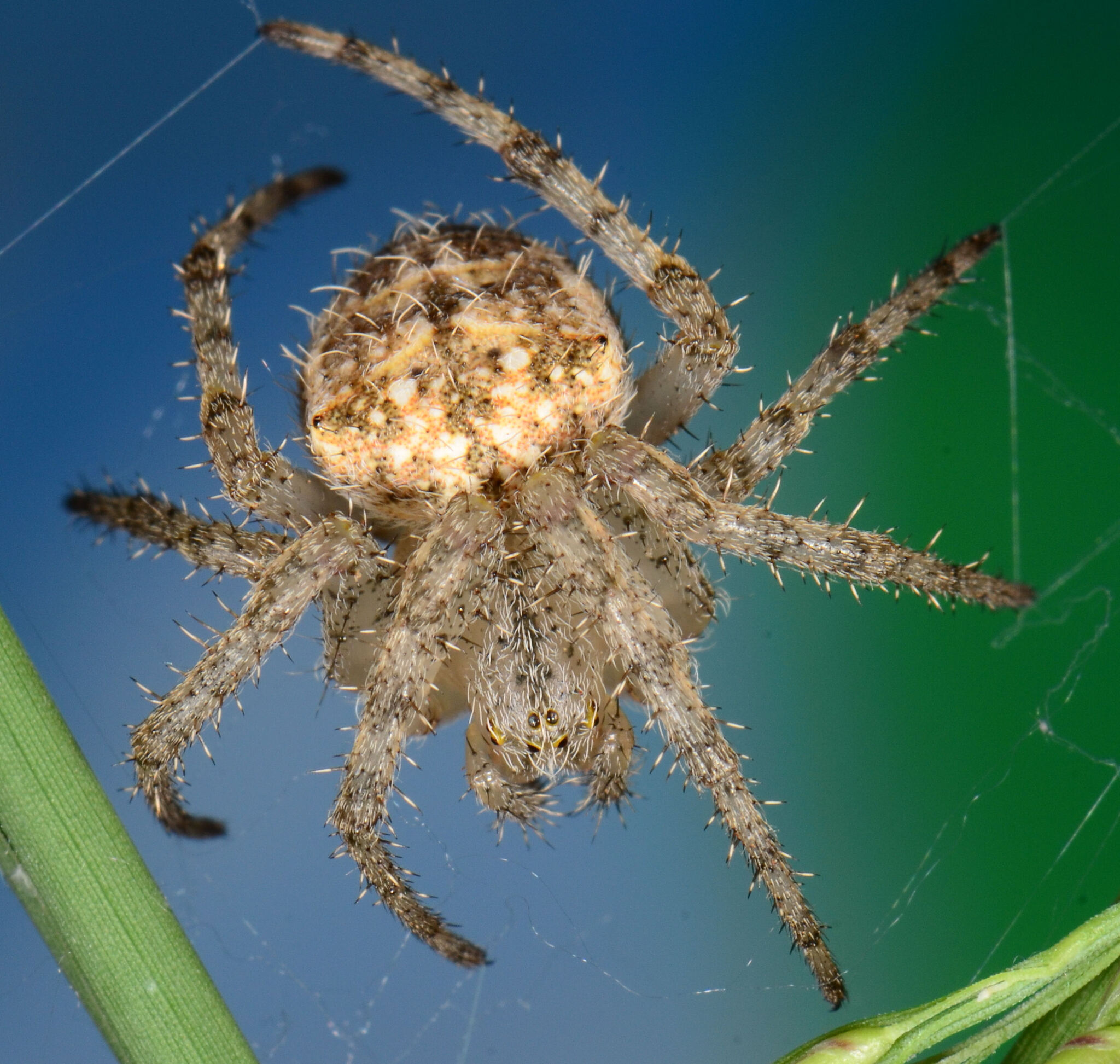
- Female
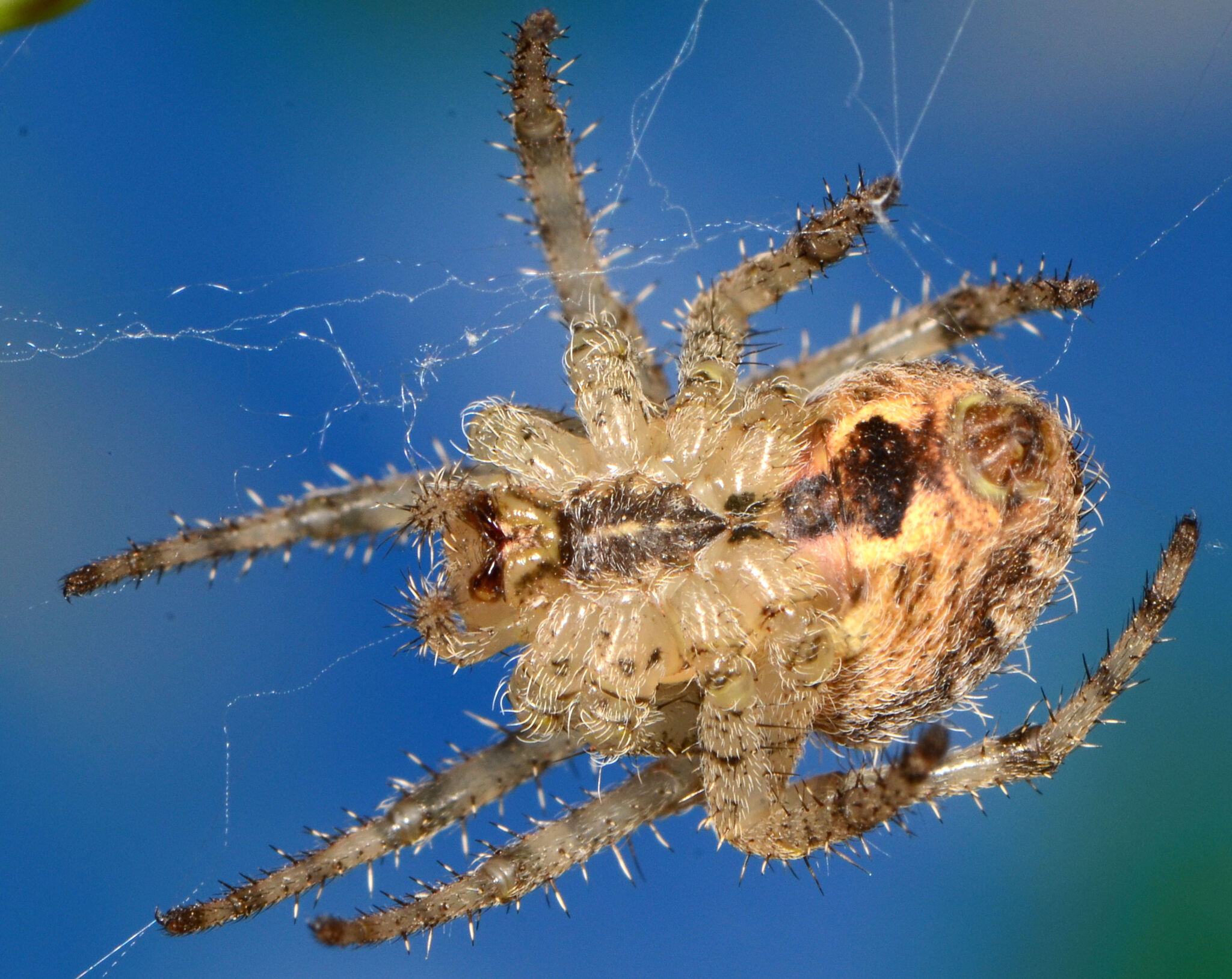
- Female

Scientific classification
- Kingdom: Animalia
- Phylum: Arthropoda
- Subphylum: Chelicerata
- Class: Arachnida
- Order: Araneae
- Infraorder: Araneomorphae
- Family: Araneidae
- Genus: Pararaneus
- Species: P. spectator

Binomial name
- Pararaneus spectator (Karsch, 1885)

= Pararaneus spectator =

White Spot Spiky Field Spider

Species of spider

Pararaneus spectator is a species of spider in the family Araneidae. It is commonly known as the white spot spiky field spider and has a wide distribution in Africa and the Middle East.

== Distribution ==
Pararaneus spectator is a species described by Karsch in 1885 as Epeira spectator with a wide global distribution including several countries in Africa and the Middle East.

In South Africa, the species has been sampled from six provinces and occurs in eight protected areas at altitudes ranging from 47 to 1,762 m above sea level. Records include locations in Eastern Cape, Free State, Gauteng, KwaZulu-Natal, Limpopo, and Mpumalanga provinces, with specific localities such as Grahamstown, Port St. Johns, Edenville, Bronkhorstspruit, Johannesburg, Pretoria, Kamberg Nature Reserve, Ndumo Game Reserve, and Kruger National Park.

== Habitat and ecology ==
The species is an orb-web spider with webs made in the field layer. It is commonly sampled with a sweep net from the Grassland, Savanna and Thicket biomes. The species has also been sampled from crops such as maize and strawberries.

== Conservation ==
Pararaneus spectator is listed as Least Concern by the South African National Biodiversity Institute due to the wide geographical range of the species. The species is protected in eight protected areas. There are no significant threats to the species.

== Etymology ==
The specific epithet "spectator" is derived from Latin meaning "observer" or "watcher".

== Taxonomy ==
The species was originally described by Ferdinand Karsch in 1885 as Epeira spectator. It was later transferred to the genus Pararaneus. The species has been revised by Grasshoff (1986) and is known from both sexes.
