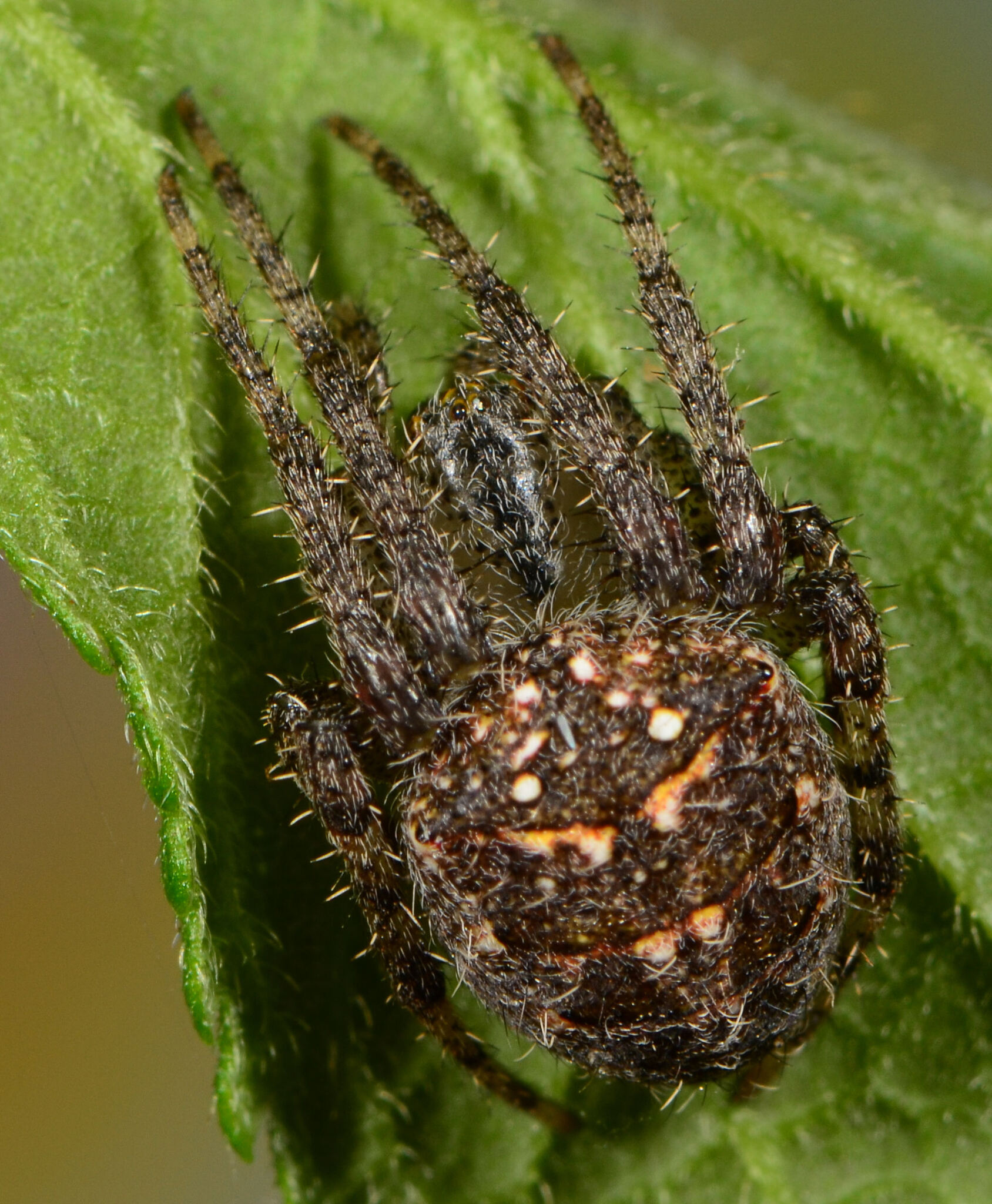
- P. spectator
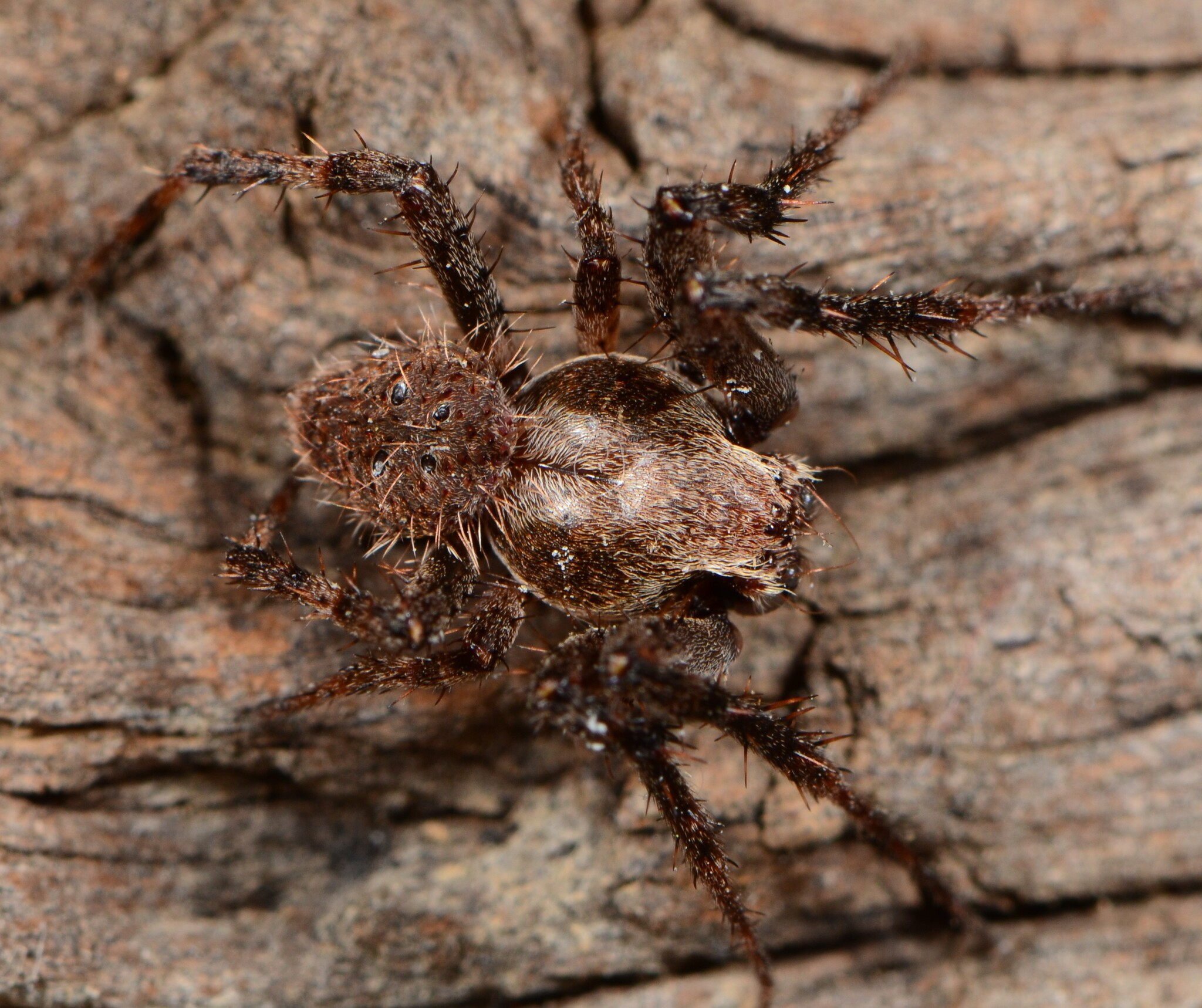
- Male P. cyrtoscapus

Scientific classification
- Kingdom: Animalia
- Phylum: Arthropoda
- Subphylum: Chelicerata
- Class: Arachnida
- Order: Araneae
- Infraorder: Araneomorphae
- Family: Araneidae
- Genus: Pararaneus; Caporiacco, 1940

Type species
- P. cyrtoscapus (Pocock, 1898)

Species
- 5, see text

= Pararaneus =

Genus of spiders

Pararaneus is a genus of orb-weaver spiders first described by Lodovico di Caporiacco in 1940.

== Description ==
Pararaneus resembles Neoscona species but they are decorated with more and stronger spines, especially the males. Their color varies from dark brown to reddish yellow. In some species the shield-like, dorsally rounded abdomen has a pair of small white spots and in most species there are four or five transverse bands over the abdomen.

Their moderately long legs are the same color as the carapace and bear strong spines, especially in males. Anterior protruding eyes are especially significant in males, with the eyes positioned on tubercles.

== Species ==
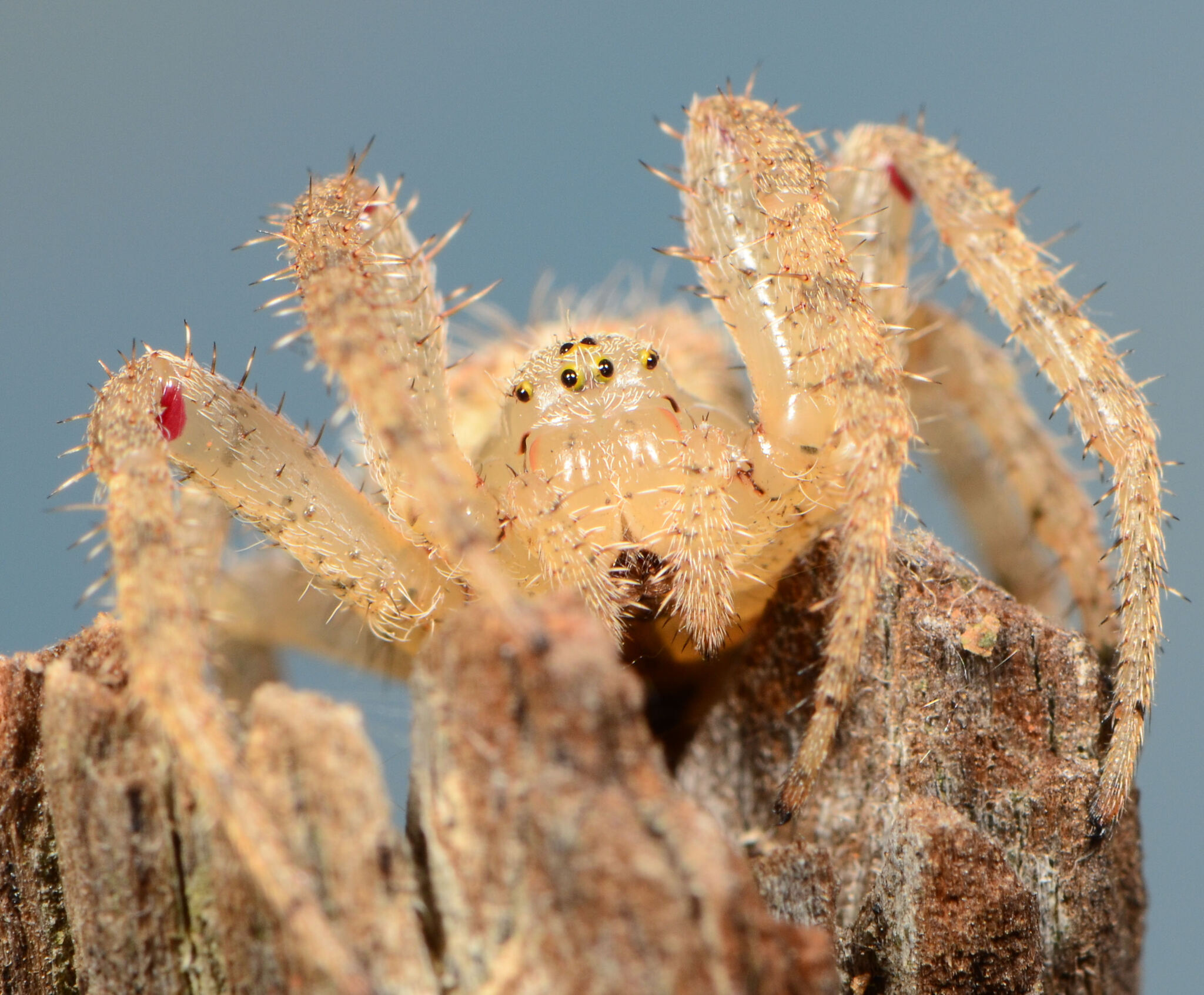
female P. cyrtoscapus

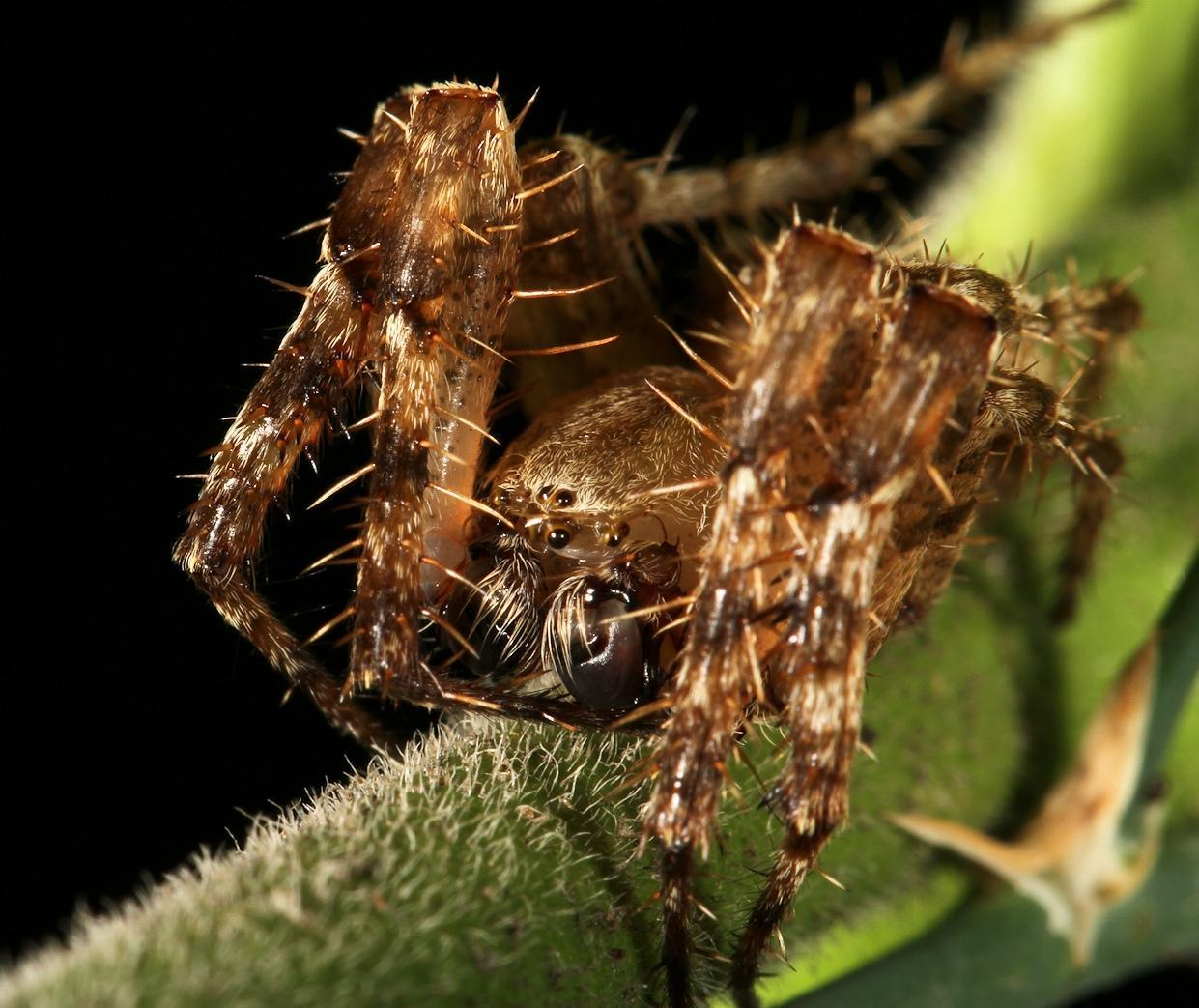
P. perforatus

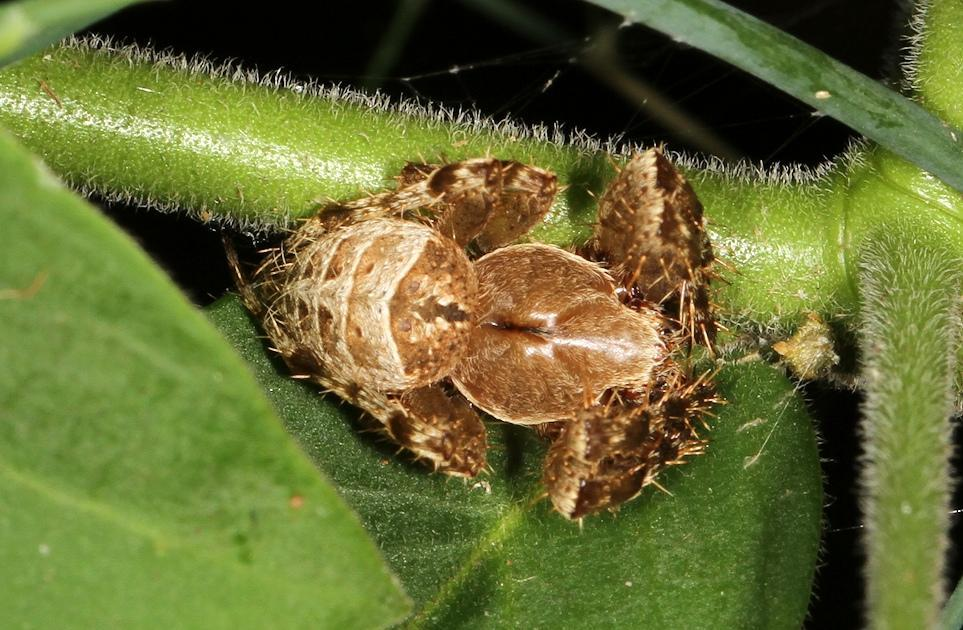
P. perforatus

As of November 2026, this genus includes five species:

- Pararaneus cyrtoscapus (Pocock, 1898) – Central, East, Southern Africa, Yemen (Socotra) (type species)
- Pararaneus perforatus (Thorell, 1899) – Central, East, Southern Africa
- Pararaneus pseudostriatus (Strand, 1908) – Central, East Africa
- Pararaneus spectator (Karsch, 1885) – Africa, Middle East
- Pararaneus uncivulva (Strand, 1907) – Madagascar
