= Modjadji Nature Reserve =

Cycad nature reserve in Limpopo

- Type: Nature Reserve
- Nearest city: Modjadjiskloof
- Coordinates: 23°37′39″S 30°21′43″E
- Area: 305.61 ha
- Established: 3 April 1983

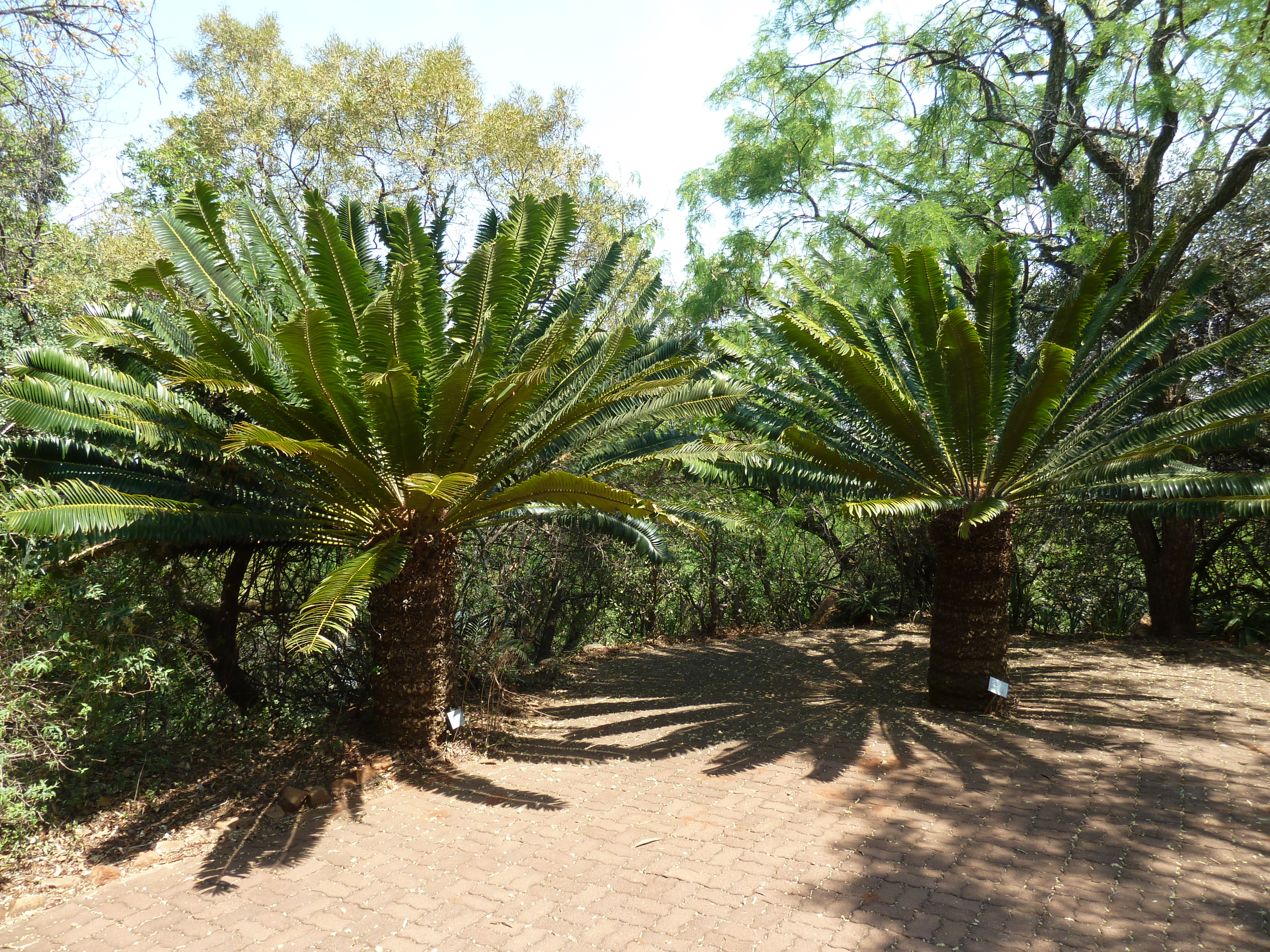
Encephalartos transvenosus

Modjadji Nature Reserve, also known as the Modjadji Cycad Reserve, is situated near Modjadjiskloof, Limpopo province, South Africa. The reserve has an area of around 350 hectares (860 acres). It encloses two steep ridges that are densely forested with the cycad Encephalartos transvenosus, the population of which is estimated at 15,000 individuals.

Hiking along the trails in this nature reserve, it is common to encounter dassies, monkeys, bushpigs, impala, nyala, bushbuck and other antelope. The reserve has a picnic and barbecue area, information centre, and curio shop.

== See also ==
- Protected areas of South Africa
- Cycad Nature Reserve – Nature reserve in the Eastern Cape, South Africa
- Rain Queen
