= Waters Meeting Nature Reserve =

Forest reserve in the Eastern Cape, South Africa

- Type: Nature Reserve
- Nearest city: Bathurst, Eastern Cape, South Africa
- Coordinates: 33°30′00″S 26°45′29″E
- Designated: February 8, 1985; 40 years ago
- Administered by: Eastern Cape Parks
- Hiking trails: Four
- Website: Eastern Cape Tourism
- Waters Meeting Nature Reserve (South Africa) Waters Meeting Nature Reserve (Eastern Cape)

The Waters Meeting Nature Reserve is a forest nature reserve near Bathurst in the Eastern Cape, South Africa. The reserve covers 4,054.89 ha (10,019.9 acres), divided into two sections. The Kowie River borders the western edge of the reserve and separates it in the upper section with the Buffalo Kloof Protected Environment. The lower section contains the Sarel Hayward Dam.

== History ==
The reserve was designated in 1985 for the conservation of the region's flora and fauna.

== See also ==
- List of protected areas of South Africa
