= Bloukrans River (Grahamstown) =

River in the Eastern Cape, South Africa

- Location within South Africa Location within Eastern Cape

Location
- Country: South Africa
- State: Eastern Cape

Physical characteristics
- Mouth: Kowie River
  - coordinates: 33°25′S 26°39′E

The Bloukrans River (Grahamstown) is a tributary of the Kowie River, and is situated near Grahamstown in the Eastern Cape province of South Africa. The endangered Eastern Province rocky is found in the Bloukrans River section of the Blaauwkrantz Nature Reserve.

== See also ==
- List of rivers of South Africa
