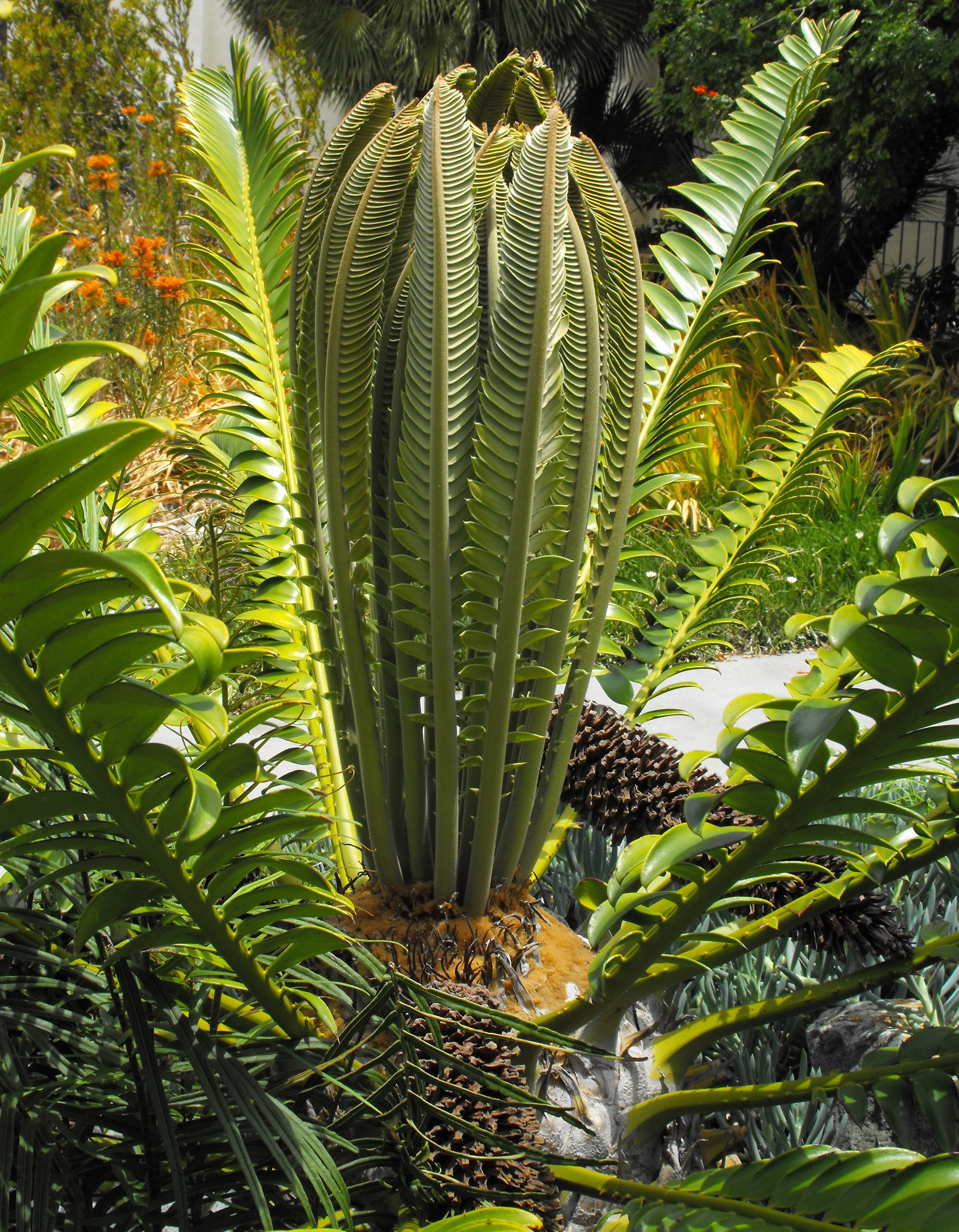

Conservation status
- Near Threatened (IUCN 3.1)
- CITES Appendix I

Scientific classification
- Kingdom: Plantae
- Clade: Tracheophytes
- Clade: Gymnosperms
- Division: Cycadophyta
- Class: Cycadopsida
- Order: Cycadales
- Family: Zamiaceae
- Genus: Encephalartos
- Species: E. transvenosus

Binomial name
- Encephalartos transvenosus Stapf & Burtt-Davy

= Encephalartos transvenosus =

Modjadji cycad

Species of cycad

Encephalartos transvenosus is a palm-like cycad in the family Zamiaceae, with a localized distribution in Limpopo, South Africa. Its common names, Modjadji's cycad or Modjadji's palm, allude to the female dynasty of the Lobedu people, the Rain Queens, whose hereditary name is Modjadji. The queen resides near a valley (of late a nature reserve) which is densely forested with these cycads, which they protected and hold sacred. The species name transvenosus refers to the fine network of veins between the main veins. These can be seen when the leaf is held up to the light.

== Description ==
Cultivated speciment in Madeira, Portugal

The cycad can reach a height of twelve meters with a thick trunk marked by a net-like pattern. It has shiny, spiny leaves arranged in a nearly straight pattern, each leaf reaching up to two and a half meters in length. The leaflets are wide, with the middle ones reaching about three centimeters in width, slightly curved, and with small teeth along the edges. The tree produces two to four large cones nestled among its leaves. The female cone can grow up to eighty centimeters long, weigh thirty-four kilograms, and contain bright orange-red seeds.

== Range ==
Modjadji's cycad grows in the mountains of Limpopo Province particularly on two hills east near Modjadjiskloof (formerly Duiwelskloof). It is a tall majestic tree and has been protected by generations of rainqueens. It forms pure forests on these hills, the only cycad forests in Southern Africa.
