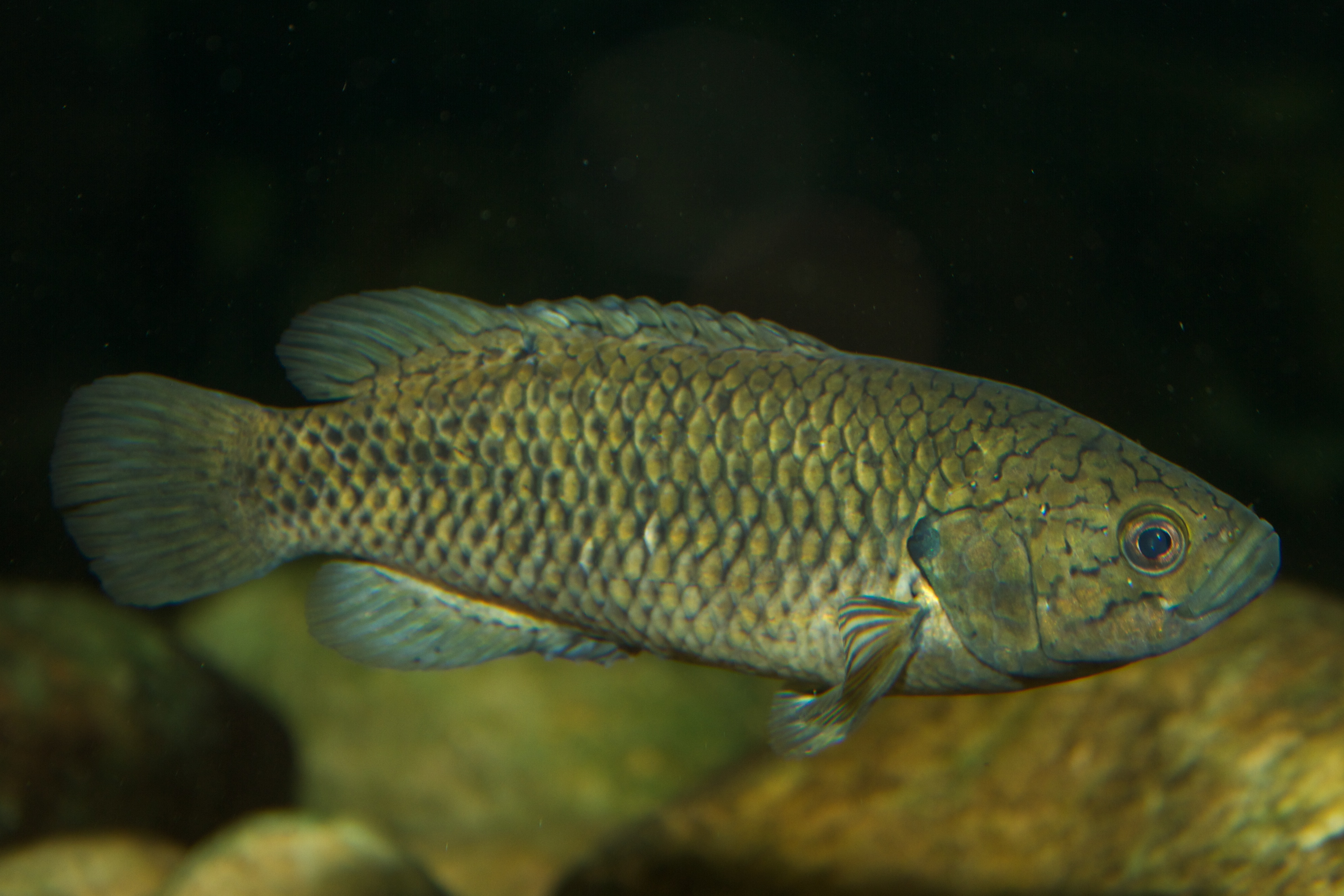

Conservation status
- Data Deficient (IUCN 3.1)

Scientific classification
- Kingdom: Animalia
- Phylum: Chordata
- Class: Actinopterygii
- Order: Anabantiformes
- Family: Anabantidae
- Genus: Sandelia
- Species: S. capensis

Binomial name
- Sandelia capensis (G. Cuvier, 1829)
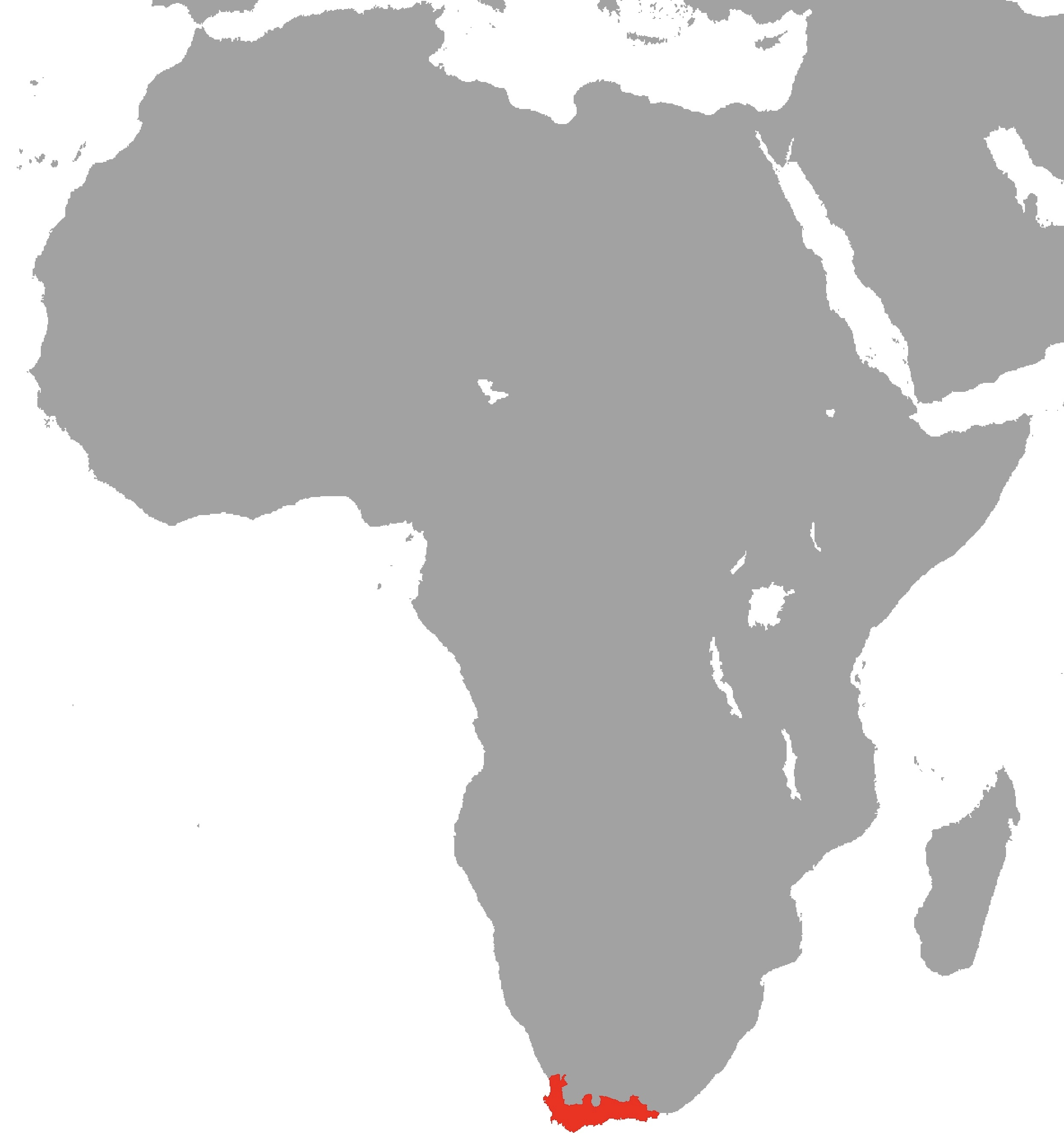

Synonyms
- Spirobranchus capensis Cuvier, 1829; Anabas capensis (Cuvier, 1829); Sardelia capensis (Cuvier, 1829); Anabas vicinus Boulenger,1916; Sandelia vicina (Boulenger, 1916); Sandelia vicinus (Boulenger, 1916)

= Cape kurper =

Species of fish

The Cape kurper (Sandelia capensis) is a species of fish in the family Anabantidae, the climbing gouramis or climbing perches. It is endemic to South Africa.

== Description ==
The Cape kurper can grow to 25 cm in length and weigh up to 200g. It has a mainly yellow to golden brown colouration with dark markings on the dorsal part of the body which extend onto the dorsal and anal fins. Males are more colourful than females.

== Distribution ==
The Cape kurper is endemic to the Western Cape and Eastern Cape, where it is found in coastal rivers from the Coega River, which flows into Algoa Bay through the Cape Flats and north to the Verlorevlei River. It has been introduced into the Clanwilliam Olifants River system.

== Habitat ==
The Cape kurper is an adaptable species and occurs in various habitats from rocky, faster flowing streams to more slower, heavily-vegetated waters. It shows a preference for quieter marginal areas, where it finds shelter among rocks, submerged roots and branches of trees or in aquatic plants.

== Habits ==
Cape kurpers feed on insects and other invertebrates as well as small fish and crabs.

Cape kurpers breed during the southern summer; the male chooses a site on the substrate, which he defends aggressively from other males. He also develops a breeding pattern of dark vertical bars with black fins, and a darkening of the lower mandible. Females are displayed to by the male blowing bubbles. Later courtship involves quite vigorous chasing and biting, climaxing when the pair spawn. The female appears to lay the eggs which adhere to the substrate and them the male moves in and releases his milt After spawning the male chases the female away, and assumes sole responsibility for guarding and tending the eggs and the young fry, which also adhere to substrate, in typical fashion for the Anabantidae.

The Cape kurper occasionally plays dead when caught by anglers, only to slip out of the hands as soon as the hook has been removed.

== Conservation ==
The Cape kurper is threatened by introduced fish especially the largemouth bass, smallmouth bass and spotted bass, which have been introduced into many of the waters where the Cape kurper occurs. Other threats include damming, pollution and climatic changes.

== Taxonomy ==
The Cape kurper is currently considered to be a single species, however, recent genetic studies have revealed that there are no fewer than two, and possibly more lineages. This may mean that there are at least two separate species but further study is required.
