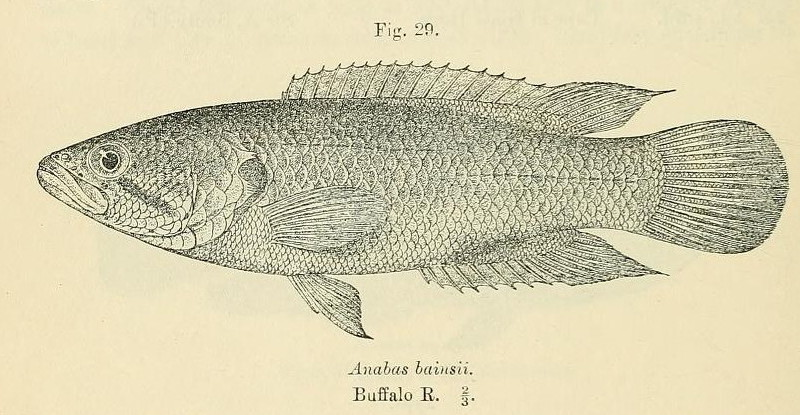

Conservation status
- Endangered (IUCN 3.1)

Scientific classification
- Kingdom: Animalia
- Phylum: Chordata
- Class: Actinopterygii
- Division: Teleostei
- Order: Anabantiformes
- Family: Anabantidae
- Genus: Sandelia
- Species: S. bainsii

Binomial name
- Sandelia bainsii Castelnau, 1861
- Eastern Province rocky (Sandelia bainsii) distribution

= Eastern Province rocky =

Species of fish

The Eastern Province rocky (Sandelia bainsii), also known as rocky kurper, is a species of fish in the family Anabantidae. It is endemic to South Africa.

The specific name of this species is thought to honour the Scottish geologist, explorer and soldier Andrew Geddes Bain (1797-1864) who also collected zoological specimens. Bain served as a captain in the Cape Frontier Wars and may have fought the tribal chief Sandile, for whom Castelnau named the genus.

== Distribution ==
It used to be found in small populations dispersed in small areas over a wide distribution throughout the Eastern Cape, such as in the Gulu River, Igoda River, Yellowwoods River (Buffalo), Nahoon River, Kowie River, Koonap River, Kat River (Great Fish) and the Tyhume River (Keiskamma). It is doubtful whether those fragmented populations will be viable in the future because they find themselves under a number of threats from agricultural practices, pollution and invasive species. It is found in the Bloukrans River in the Blaauwkrantz Nature Reserve.
