= Moorddrift Monument =

Coordinates: 24.2768°S 28.974°E

The Moorddrift Monument (lit. Murder Ford Monument) is a provincial heritage site in Potgietersrus (Waterberg District Municipality) in the Limpopo province of South Africa.

In 1993 it was described in the Government Gazette as

This simple but important little monument stands under two large camelthorn trees beside the national road 16 km south of Potgietersrust, just where the road used to cross the Nyl River by a drift. It commemorates the murder of a number of settlers in this region.
