= Buffalo Kloof Protected Environment =

Protected Environment in the Eastern Cape in South Africa

- Buffalo Kloof Protected Environment location
- Location: Eastern Cape, South Africa
- Nearest city: Makhanda, South Africa
- Coordinates: 33°23′41″S 26°37′06″E
- Area: 6,781.49 ha (16,757.4 acres)
- Established: April 13, 2018; 8 years ago
- Governing body: Eastern Cape Parks and Tourism Agency
- Website: Buffalo Kloof Conservancy
- Buffalo Kloof Protected Environment (South Africa) Buffalo Kloof Protected Environment (Eastern Cape)

Buffalo Kloof Protected Environment is a large section of protected land near Makhanda (Grahamstown). The Kowie River separates it and the Waters Meeting Nature Reserve.

== History ==
This 6,781.49 ha (16,757.4 acres) protected area was designated in 2018.

== See also ==
- List of protected areas of South Africa
