= Bathurst, South Africa =

Village in Eastern Cape, South Africa

Bathurst
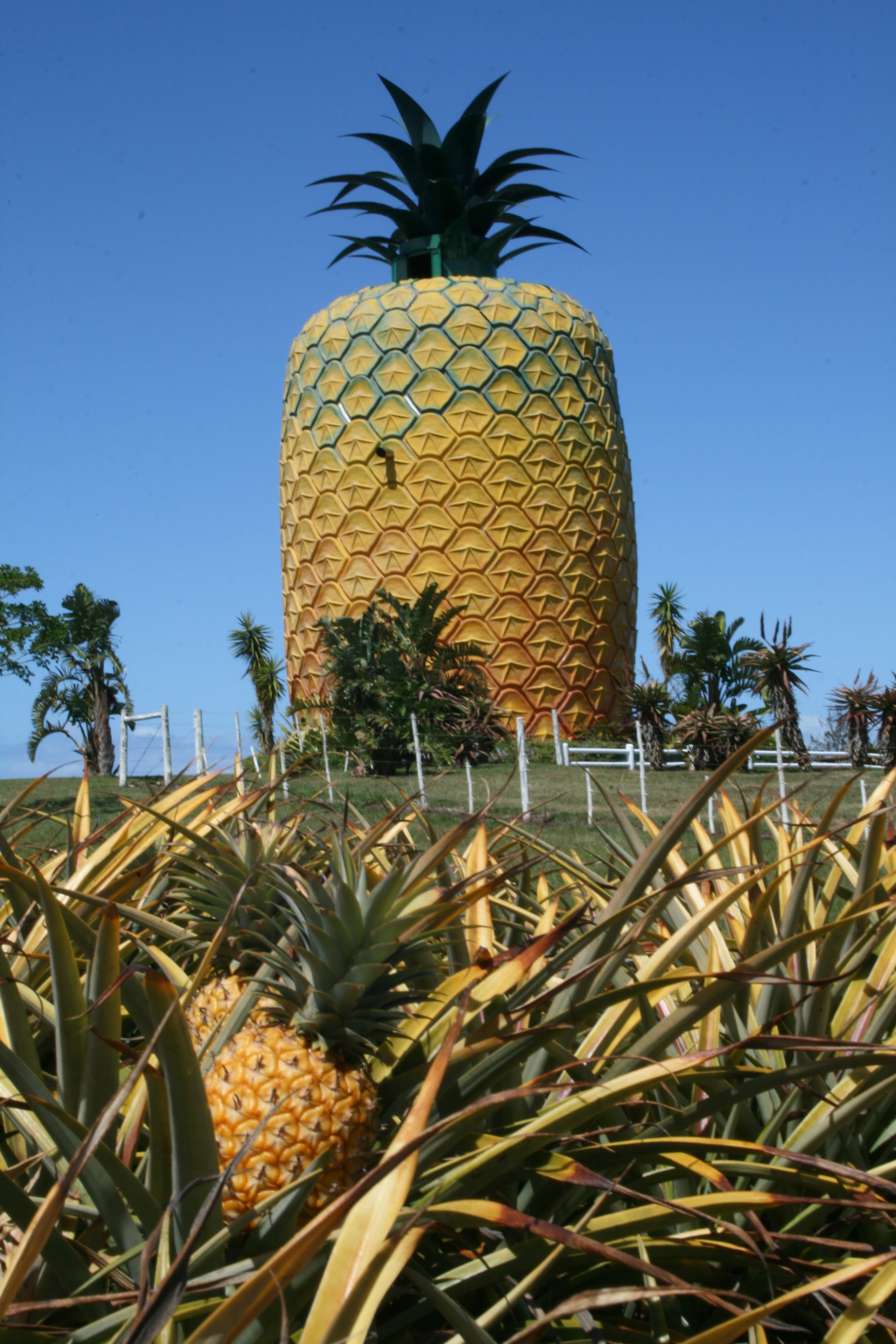
- The Big Pineapple, located on the edge of town

- Location within Eastern Cape Location within South Africa
- Coordinates: 33°30′14″S 26°49′26″E
- Country: South Africa
- Province: Eastern Cape
- District: Sarah Baartman
- Municipality: Ndlambe
- Established: 1820

Area
  - Total: 73.5 km^{2} (28.4 sq mi)

Population (2011)
  - Total: 6,368
  - Density: 86.6/km^{2} (224/sq mi)

Racial makeup (2011)
  - Black African: 90.0%
  - Coloured: 1.6%
  - Indian/Asian: 0.2%
  - White: 7.9%
  - Other: 0.4%

First languages (2011)
  - Xhosa: 84.4%
  - English: 9.1%
  - Afrikaans: 3.8%
  - Other: 2.7%
- Time zone: UTC+2 (SAST)
- Postal code (street): 6166
- PO box: 6166
- Area code: 046

Bathurst is about 12 kilometres (7.5 mi) inland from Port Alfred, on the R67 road, in the Eastern Cape province of South Africa, and is named after Henry Bathurst, 3rd Earl Bathurst, Secretary of State for the Colonies by Sir Rufane Donkin. Its chief claim to fame is that it was the early administrative centre established by the British Government for the 1820 British Settlers who were sent to the district as a buffer between the Cape Colony and the Xhosa pastoralists who were migrating southwards and westwards along the coast. Bathurst is now part of the Ndlambe Local Municipality in the Sarah Baartman District Municipality of the Eastern Cape.

== History ==
Many of the original settler houses and other buildings have been preserved, and there remains much of the look and feel of an English village of the early 19th century. The Pig and Whistle Inn, at the heart of the village, is reputedly the oldest extant pub in the country, built in 1821 by Thomas Hartley, a blacksmith who came from Nottinghamshire with the settlers. After accommodation was added to the pub, it became known as the Bathurst Inn. Legend has it that it was nicknamed "The Pig & Whistle" by the men at the nearby 43 Air School in World War II.

While time has moved slowly in Bathurst attracting those seeking a more peaceful lifestyle, academics (Rhodes University is only 40 kilometres (25 mi) away), and retirees.

There are also a growing number of artists in Bathurst. Amongst them, award winning potter Richard Pullen, established his studio in 1998.

Bathurst hosts a pineapple museum whose building is shaped like a 17 metres (56 ft) tall pineapple. The museum is in the agricultural town of Bathurst, a town known as pineapple country, on a pineapple farm known as Summerhill Pineapple Farm, an 1820 Settlers farm. In 1833, John Hawkins, who was a founder member of the Bathurst Agricultural Society, purchased the farm for 2,000 pounds. He was also one of the first farmers to plant pineapples. The Big Pineapple represents the region's pineapple industry. The settlers who arrived in the 1820s struggled to grow crops until the first pineapple was planted in 1865. The gigantic structure is a tribute to their agricultural success. It was planned to be constructed by the members of Bathurst's agricultural community in the 1980s. Construction for the structure actually began in 1990 and lasted for over 12 months. The structure was built with the intention of giving more exposure to the local pineapple industry. The Bathurst area delivers over 135 000 tons annually to factories in East London. Although it is mostly a copy of the Big Pineapple located in Queensland, Australia, the Big Pineapple in Bathurst is taller by just over two feet and thus is the World's Largest Pineapple. The structure has four floors, including a gift shop with a variety of pineapple products, a museum covering the history of pineapple farming in South Africa, a video room, and an observation deck with views over the surrounding farmlands to the Indian Ocean. The “skin” of the Big Pineapple is steel and concrete, covered in glass fibre.

Bathurst neighbours the Waters Meeting Nature Reserve, home to many species of animals, bird and plants. The reserve offers hiking trails, picnic spots and a viewpoint of the river and valley. The surrounding area hosts pineapple farms, game reserves and cattle and sheep ranches. It is a 10-minute drive to the beach town of Port Alfred, and 45 minutes from the cultural mecca of Grahamstown.

- The Horseshoe Bend and Waters Meeting Nature Reserve: There is a view of bush covered valleys where the Kowie River loops in a horse shoe. Another 3 kilometres (1.9 mi) down a steep winding road there are opportunities to picnic and relax under the trees at the waters edge. Canoe trails and scenic hikes available.
- Bradshaw's Mill: Built by the 1820 Settler, Samuel Bradshaw in 1821, this water-driven wool mill contains a working water wheel. By 1825 wool from the Settlers' sheep was being used to make coarse cloth. In 1835 the 3rd storey was added and corn milling began. It is now restored and is a Provincial Heritage Site.
- Wesleyan Chapel: Built by Samuel Bradshaw and opened in 1832, it was besieged in the Frontier Wars. Houses Jeremiah Goldswain's Family Bible. Services still held every Sunday. It is a provincial heritage site and epitomises many of the other Wesleyan churches in the rural areas. Now the Methodist Church of Bathurst.
- St John's Anglican Church : The oldest unaltered Anglican church in South Africa. A sanctuary in the Frontier Wars of 1834, 1846 and 1851 for hundreds of Settlers. The first service in this church was held on 1 January 1838.
- The Bathurst Agricultural Museum, established in 1970, hosts over 1300 items of farming equipment and accessories, including tractors and dairy utensils.
- The Toposcope: This marks the spot from where the 1820 Settlers were posted to their locations by Jacob Glen Cuyler. Fifty-seven bronze plaques record details of settlements. On a clear day there is a view from The Great Fish River to Kwaaihoek. The stones in the wall are taken from ruins of original Settler homes.

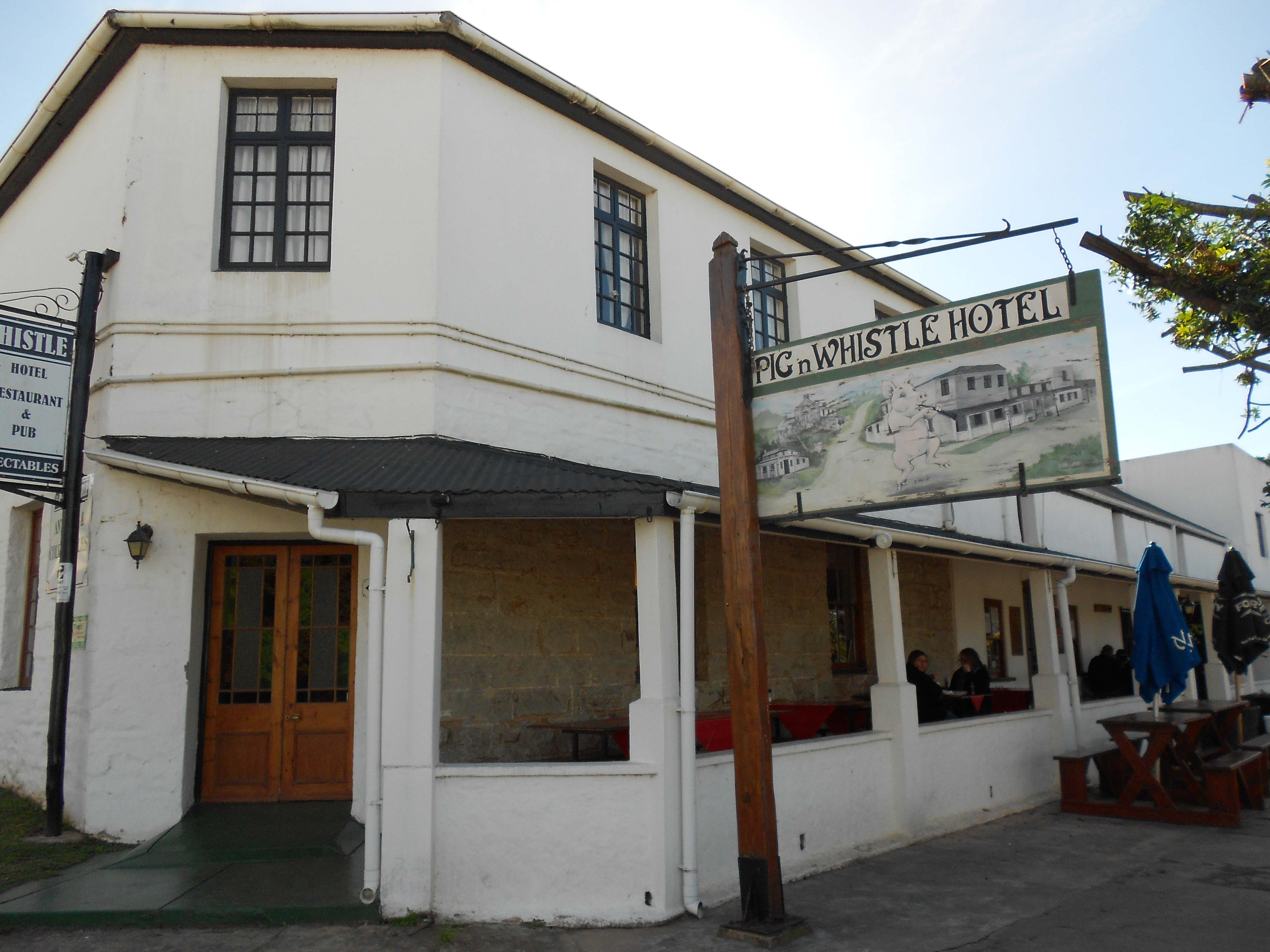
Pig and Whistle Hotel
