= Durban Botanic Gardens =

Africa's oldest surviving botanical gardens, in South Africa

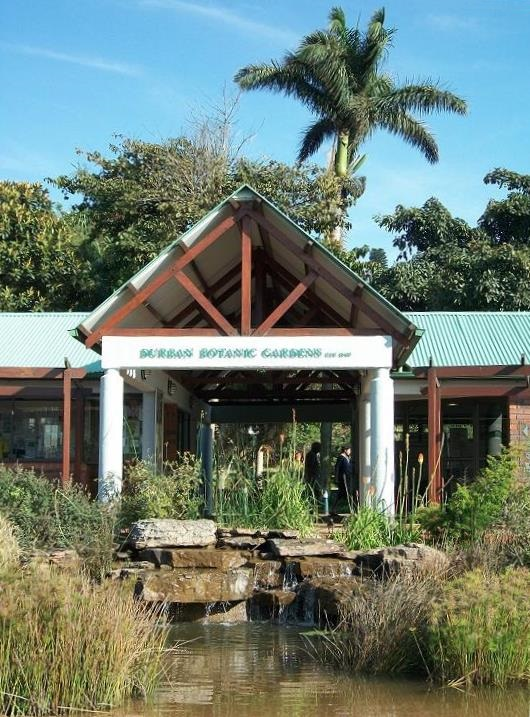
- The new entrance to Durban Botanic Garden
- Interactive map of Durban Botanic Gardens
- Type: Botanical
- Location: Durban, South Africa
- Coordinates: 29°50′48″S 31°00′24″E
- Area: 15 hectares (37 acres)
- Opened: 1851
- Website: www.durbanbotanicgardens.org.za

The Durban Botanic Gardens is situated in the city of Durban, KwaZulu-Natal, South Africa. It is Durban's oldest public institution and Africa's oldest surviving botanical gardens. The gardens cover an area of 15 hectares (37 acres) in a subtropical climate.

== History ==
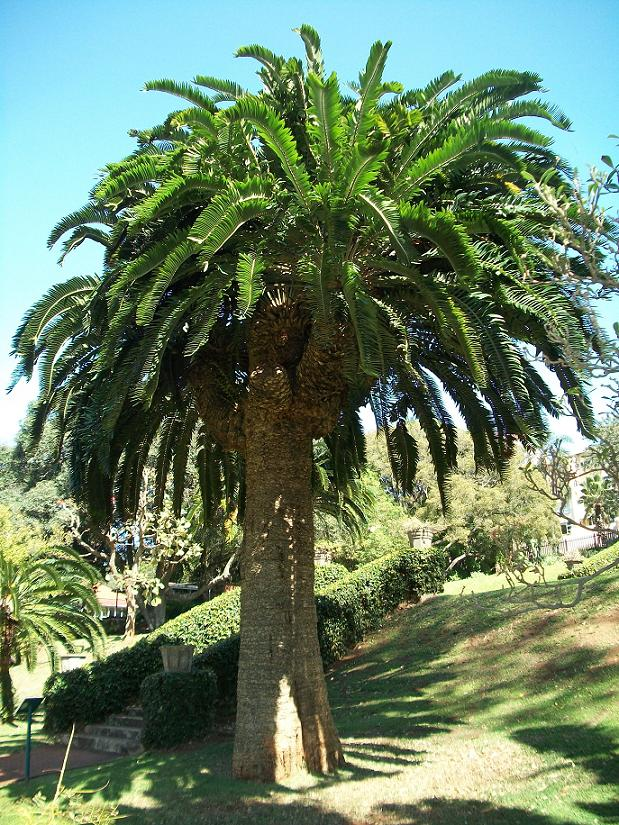
One of the original stems of Wood's Cycad in the Durban Botanic Gardens

=== Early history ===
The Durban Botanic Gardens was established to participate in the quest of Kew Gardens to establish a series of botanic gardens across the world which would assist in the introduction of economically valuable plants, and to supply plants to Kew that were new to science. The first garden was established in December 1849 by Dr Charles Johnston on the edge of the Berea Ridge next to the Umgeni River (near Quarry Road). However the death of Johnston's wife in 1850 caused him to resign his position overseeing the gardens. A Scot called Mark McKen then took his place and began to establish gardens of plants of economic value such as sugar cane, tea, coffee and pineapples. In 1851 the botanical gardens were relocated closer to town, to its present site. From 1853 to 1860 there were various curators, the most notable of which was Robert Plant, who died of malaria while collecting plants near Lake St. Lucia. McKen then returned in 1860 and was the curator for the next 12 years; until his death in 1872.

A German by the name of William Keit arrived from Glasnevin in Ireland to take over the curatorship of the gardens, but economic depression in Natal, a drought, and the Anglo-Zulu War took its toll. Keit resigned in 1881 to become a nurseryman and was later Durban's first director of parks.

=== John Medley Wood ===
A bust of John Medley Wood in the Durban Botanic Gardens

A local farmer and rural trade store owner John Medley Wood who was a self-trained botanist took over the curatorship from 1882 to 1913, and the Durban Botanic Gardens was said to have enjoyed its heyday with support of the governor of the colony of Natal, Sir Henry Bulwer who shared a keen interest in the Gardens. John Medley Wood founded the Natal Government Herbarium in 1882 which was at first a wood and corrugated iron hut in which he organised the storage of over 1,500 plant specimens. He prepared about 13,000 plant specimens, many of which were distributed by exchange, and only about 6,000 of his specimens remain in the collection of today's more than 100,000 specimens - most of which originate in KwaZulu-Natal. John Medley Wood discovered many new species of plants which he sent to Kew Gardens. His most famous discovery was a clump of a large species of cycad in Ongoye Forest in 1895. This cycad was subsequently named in honour of him in 1908 as Wood's Cycad (Encephalartos woodii) by the English horticulturalist Henry Sander. Three basal offsets of the cycad were collected by Wood's deputy, James Wylie, in 1903 and planted in the Durban Botanic Gardens, and again in a 1907 expedition, Wylie collected two of the larger stems and brought them to the gardens. Wood's Cycad is now the emblem of the Durban Botanic Gardens, where the original specimens are still growing.

Economic problems exacerbated by the suspension of a government grant in the last years of the Natal Colony caused the collapse of the Durban Agricultural and Horticultural Society, who had owned the Gardens. In 1913, most of the garden was transferred to the Durban Corporation also known as the City of Durban, but about 1 acre (0.40 ha) including the herbarium and Medley Wood's house was excised and transferred to the Union Department of Agriculture, the following year. After Medley's death on 26 August 1915, he was succeeded as curator of the herbarium by P.A. van der Bijl, a noted mycologist. Because of the subsequent political changes with the Union of South Africa, the gardens went into a state of decline, but many of the trees planted by McKen, Keit and Medley Wood are still growing in the Durban Botanical Gardens.

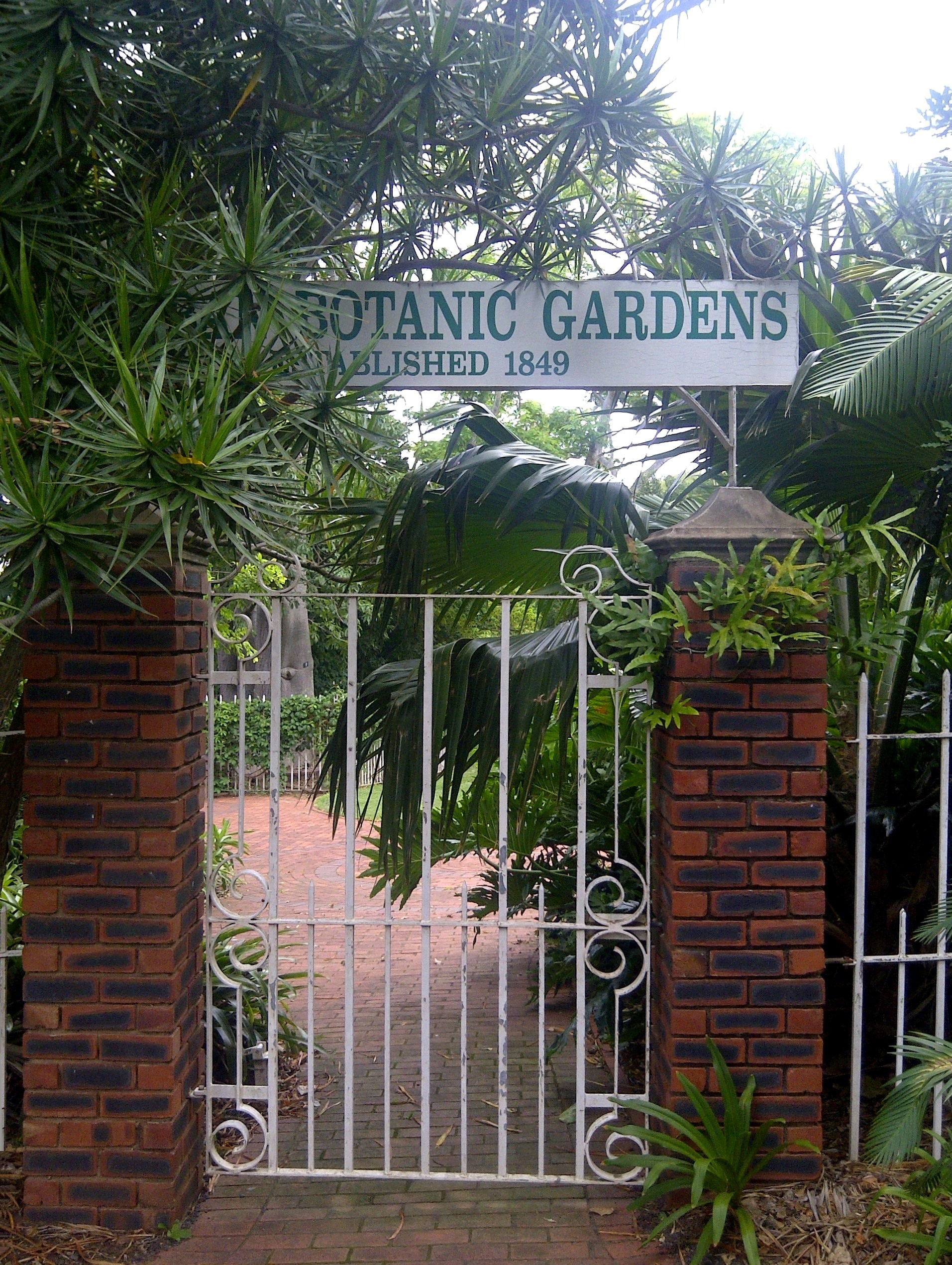
Durban Botanic Gardens Established Board

=== Later history ===
William Keit again took over the gardens on 27 August 1916, about a year after the death of John Medley Wood.

Among later curators was Ernest Thorp (from 1950 to 1975) who oversaw the construction of the orchid house at the Durban Botanic Gardens in 1962. The orchid house was named after him as the Ernest Thorp Orchid House. While Ernest Thorp was the curator, F. W. Thorns was the director. Around 1965 the Durban Botanic Gardens was noted for its collection of Cannas, and Ernest Thorp sent rhizomes of three varieties to Longwood Gardens in the United States upon request.

In 1999 the gardens were surveyed and mapped so that the various plants and their relevant information could be traced with the aid of GIS software.

== Plant collections ==
=== Cycads ===
The gardens contain an extensive collection of cycads from South Africa and from other parts of the world. The most notable specimens are those of Wood's Cycad. In 1992 and 1993 the cycads were rearranged to represent their geographic distribution. The species that grow here include:

- Encephalartos altensteinii
- Encephalartos arenarius
- Encephalartos ferox
- Encephalartos horridus
- Encephalartos lehmannii
- Encephalartos longifolius
- Encephalartos natalensis
- Encephalartos villosus
- Stangeria eriopus

=== Ferns ===
John Medley Wood was an avid collector of ferns and published A Popular Description of the Natal Ferns in 1877, and The Classification of Ferns in 1879. As of 2010 the Durban Botanic Gardens has a collection of ferns, many of which grow in the section of the gardens called the "Fern Dell". The collection consists of both local and exotic species.

=== Orchids ===
The orchid collection first began in 1931, was moved to the Ernest Thorp Orchid House in 1962, and since 2010 consists of more than 9,000 plants including Cattleya, Phalaenopsis and Vanda, which are put on display in the orchid house when in bloom (mostly in spring and autumn).

=== Bromeliads ===
Some of the first bromeliads (discounting the pineapples of ~1850) may have been received by Medley at the gardens in 1885. Various species of bromeliads grow in mass plantings in the gardens, and some are placed in the orchid house on display during winter and summer when fewer orchids are in bloom.

=== Trees ===
There are at least 1,354 individual trees, and about 917 palms growing in the Durban Botanical Gardens.

== Activities and events ==
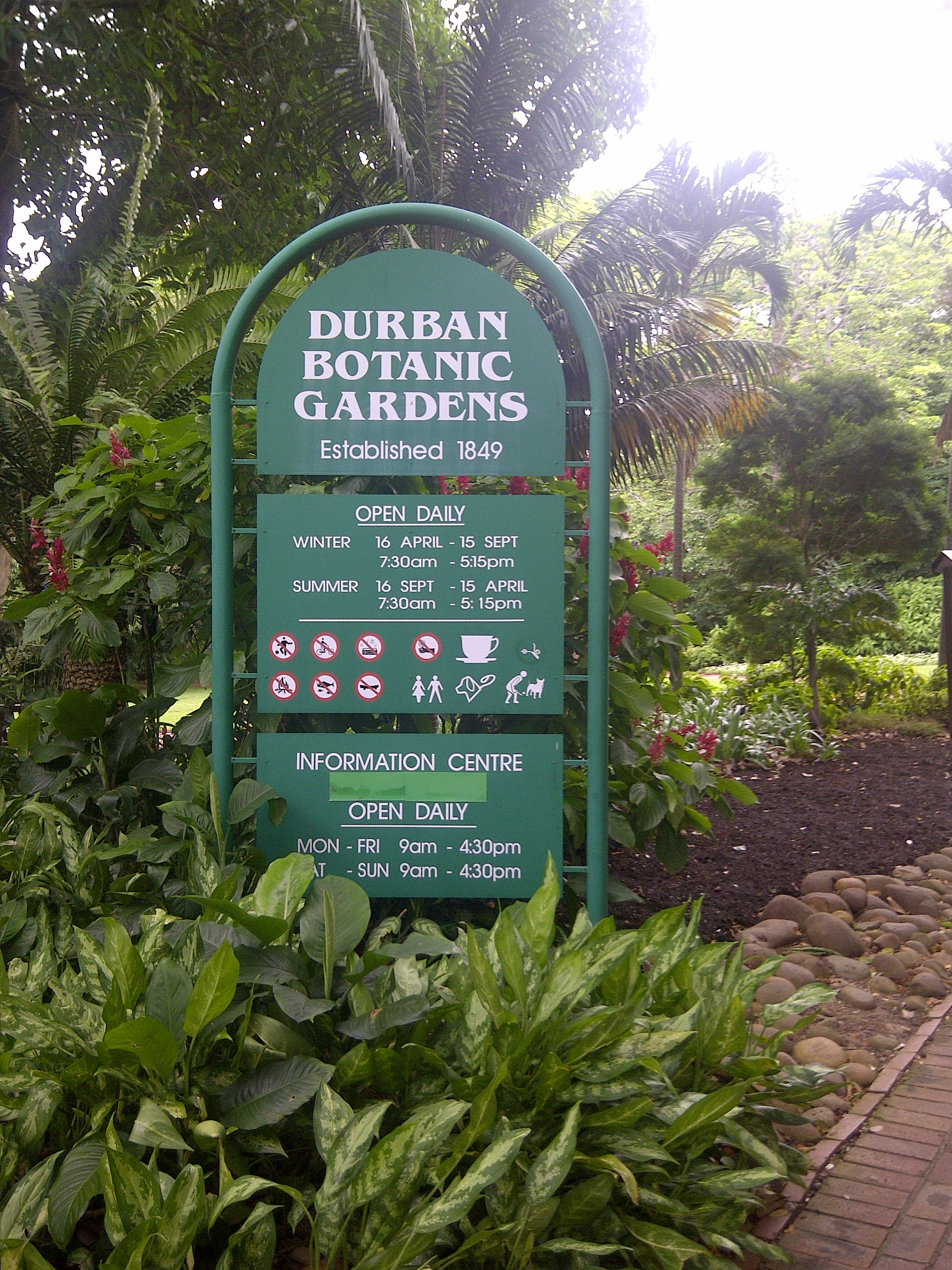
Durban Botanic Gardens Information Board

The grounds currently host various social gatherings such as local music bands and 'Victorian tea parties', as well as an indigenous plant fair in spring (September) each year. The fair is hosted by the Botanical Society of South Africa, and in 2009 and 2010 the Lepidopterists' Society of Africa was involved to promote the growing of indigenous butterfly food plants. The theme of the Fair for 2010 was taken from the UN's International Year of Biodiversity, and more than 750 species of plants indigenous to South Africa were available.

== Gallery ==
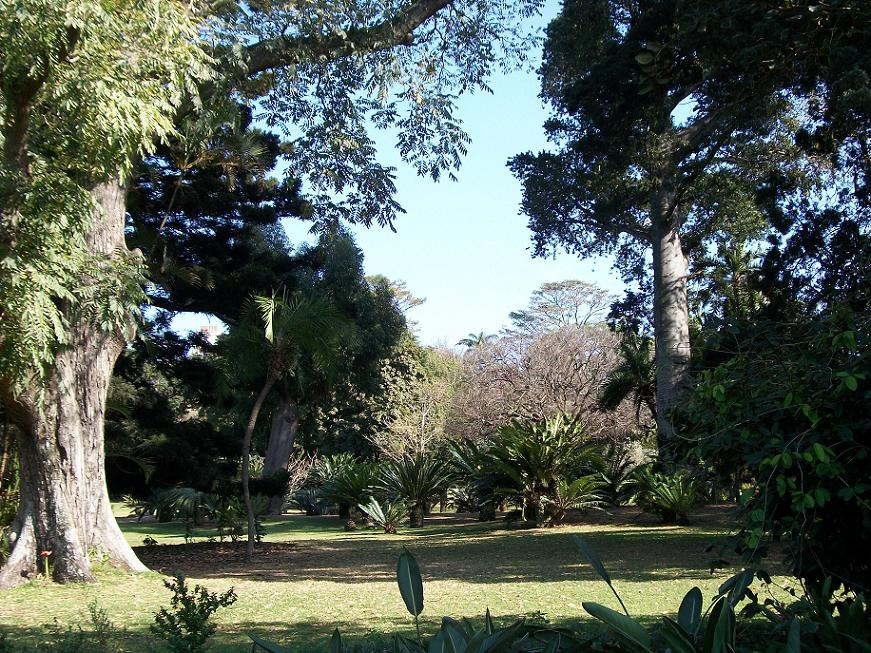
A view of large trees and cycads at the Durban Botanic Gardens

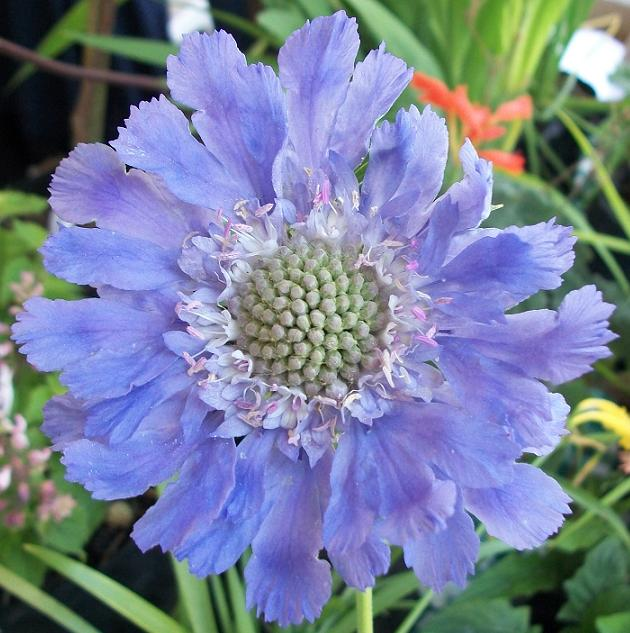
Scabiosa africana at the Indigenous Plant Fair 2010

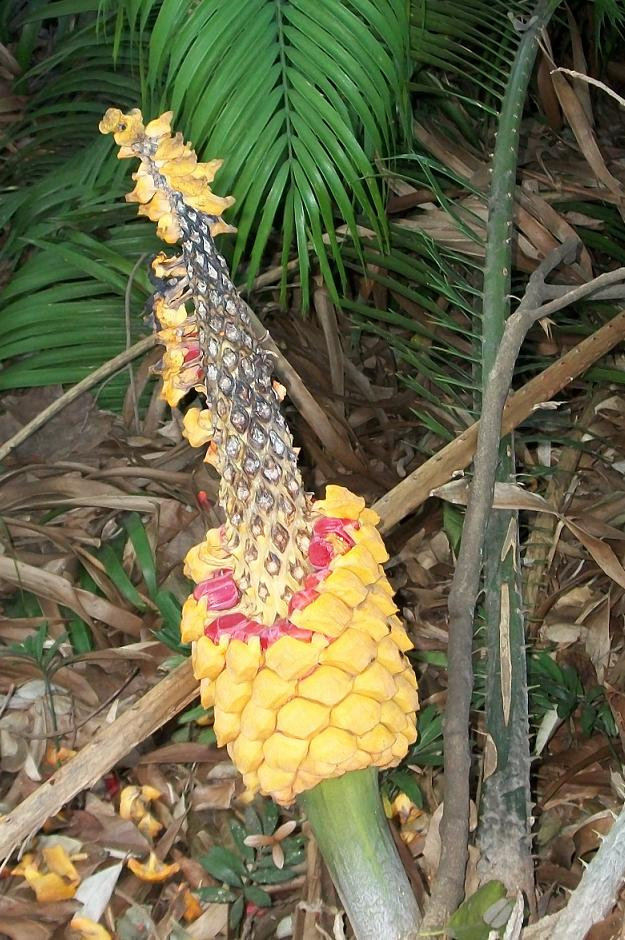
Encephalartos villosus

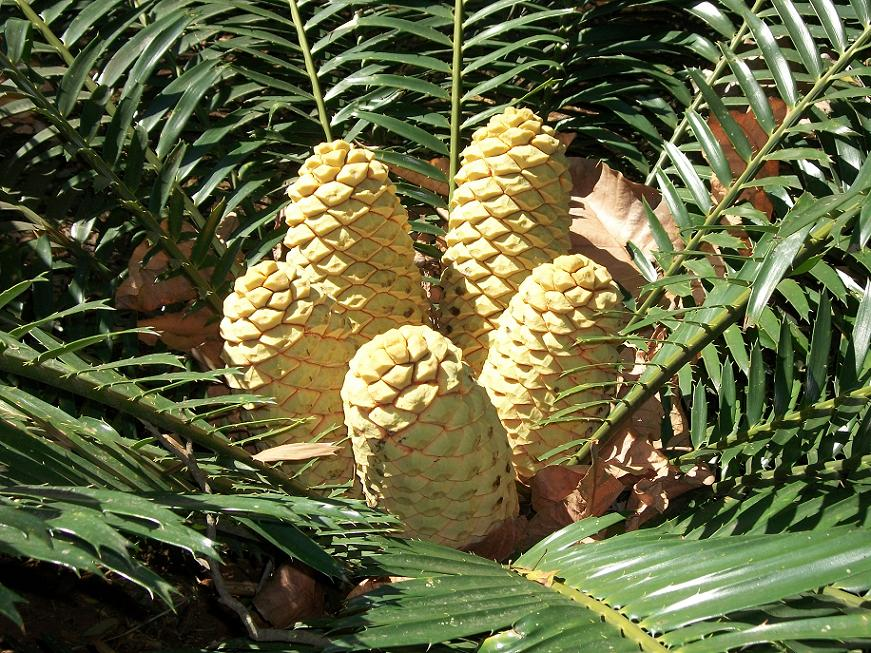
Cones on an Encephalartos cycad

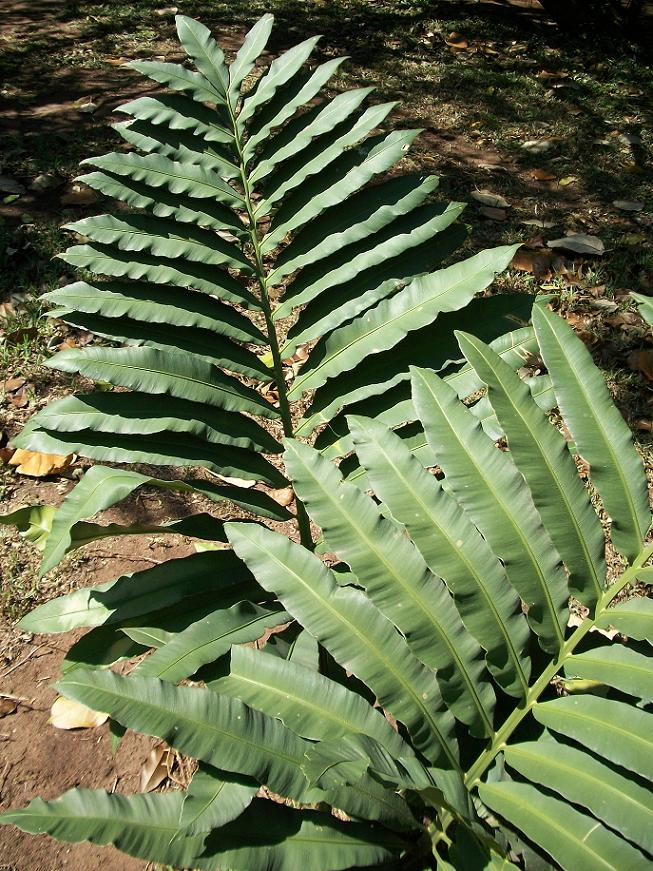
Stangeria eriopus, a cycad once thought to be a fern

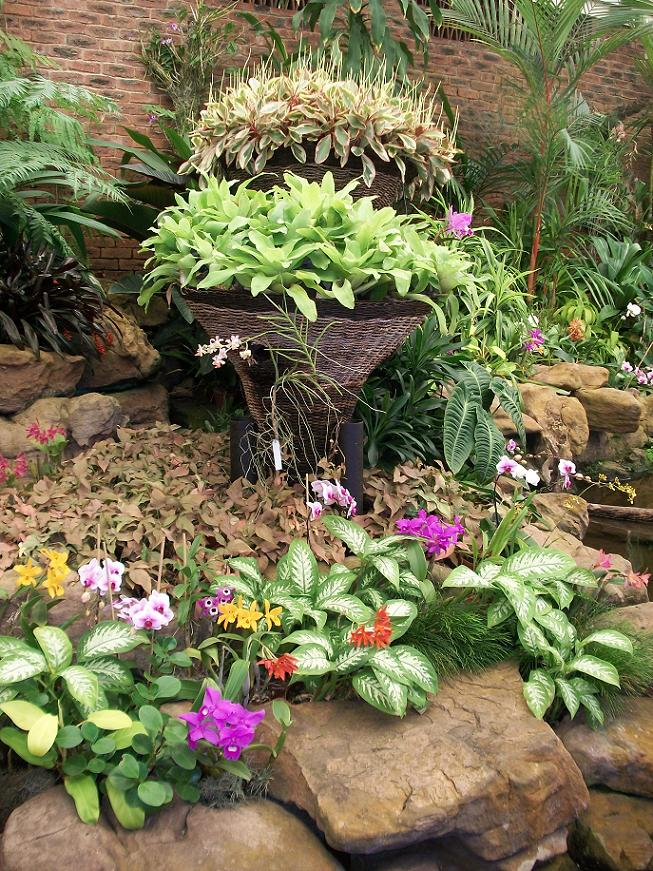
Inside the Ernest Thorp Orchid House

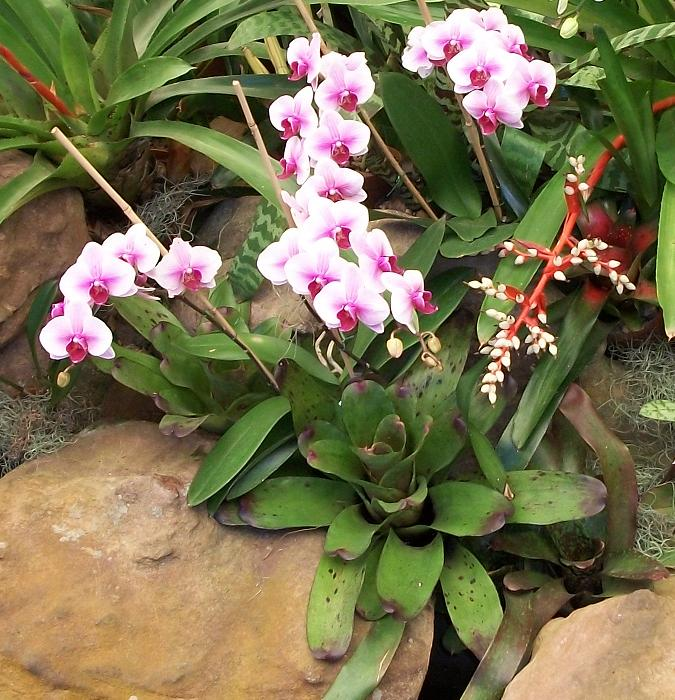
Orchids and Bromeliads

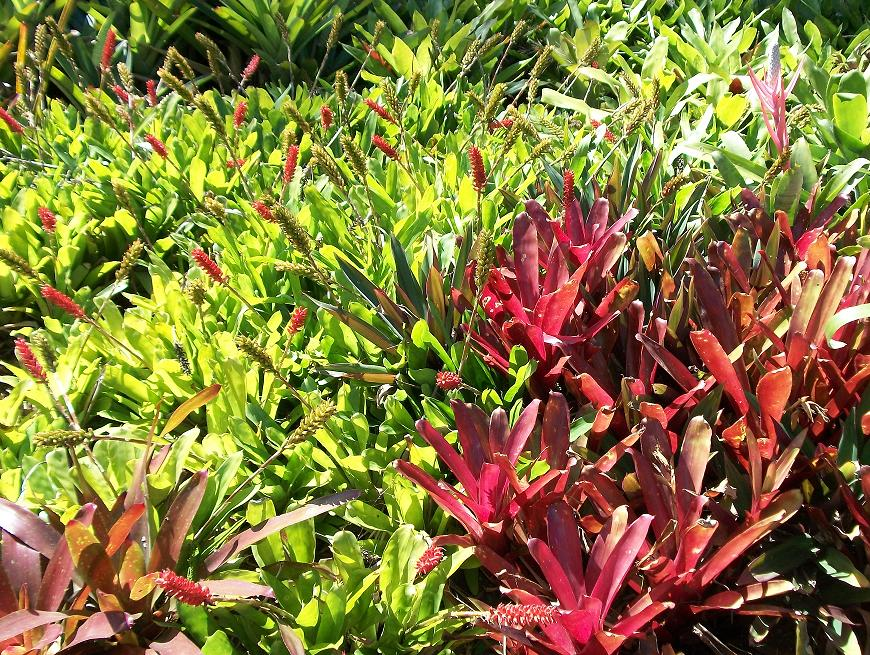
Bromeliads in a mass planting

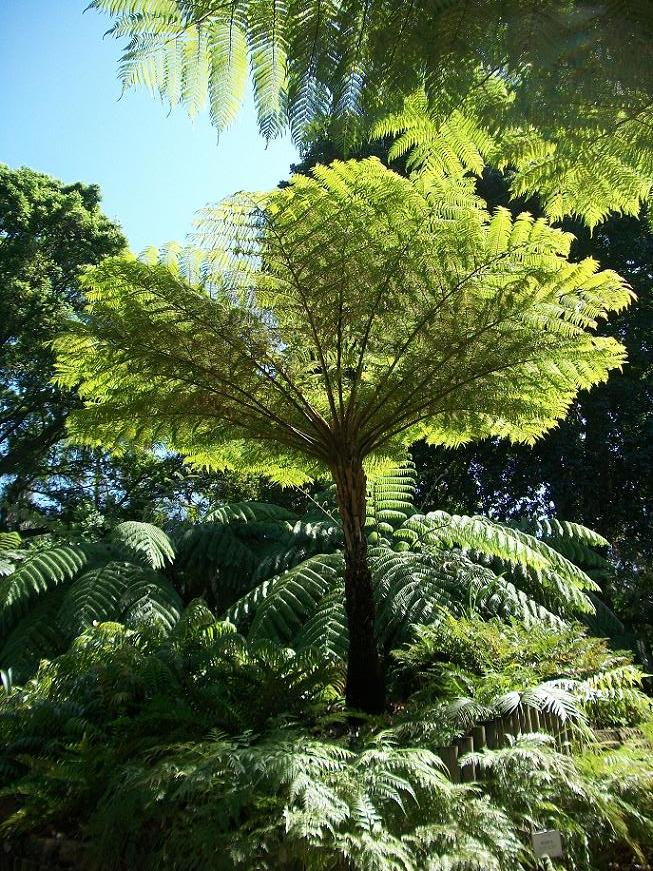
A Tree Fern in the Gardens

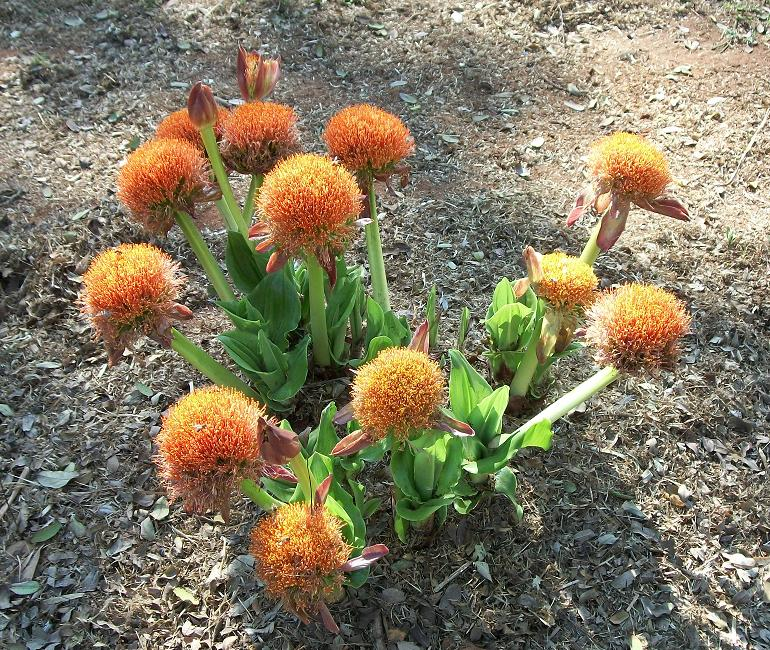
Scadoxus puniceus growing in the shade of the trees

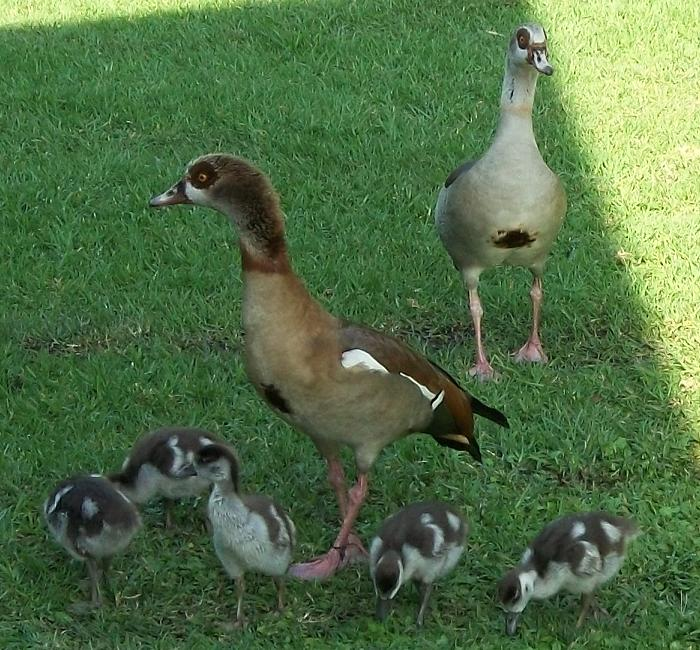
A family of Egyptian geese on the lawn

== See also ==
- List of botanical gardens in South Africa
