= Yimbulunga foordi =

Scientific classification
- Kingdom: Animalia
- Phylum: Arthropoda
- Subphylum: Chelicerata
- Class: Arachnida
- Order: Araneae
- Infraorder: Araneomorphae
- Family: Salticidae
- Genus: Yimbulunga
- Species: Y. foordi

Binomial name
- Yimbulunga foordi Wesołowska, Azarkina & Russell-Smith, 2014

Species of spider

Yimbulunga foordi is the type species of the genus Yimbulunga. It is a species of jumping spider species that lives in South Africa. The male was described in 2014 by Wanda Wesołowska, Galina Azarkina and Anthony Russell-Smith. The female has not been identified. The spider is very small, with a carapace that is 1.8 mm (0.071 in) long and an abdomen 1.4 mm (0.055 in) long. Both the carapace and abdomen are rounded, which is reflected in the genus name, the Zulu word for spherical. The pedipalps are brown with a small lobe on the palpal bulb and a thin embolus that coils all the way round. The shape of the embolus and the overall stout shape of the spider differentiate the species.

== Etymology ==
The species is named after South African arachnologist Stefan Hendrik Foord.

== Taxonomy ==
Yimbulunga foordi is a species of jumping spiders that was first described by Wanda Wesołowska, Galina Azarkina and Anthony Russell-Smith in 2014. It was one of over 500 species identified by Wesołowska. They raised the genus Yimbulunga at the same time and named the Yimbulunga foordi as the type species. Yimbulunga jumping spiders are small, with a distinctive stout form to their body. The species name is derived from a Zulu word that means spherical, and relates to the rounded form of the body. In 2015, Wayne Maddison listed the genus in the tribe Euophryini, named after the genus Euophrys. The position of the genus within the clade is uncertain. In 2017, the genus was grouped with seven other genera of jumping spiders under the name Euophryines by Jerzy Prószyński. The species is named after the arachnologist Stefan Foord from the University of Venda.

== Description ==
Yimbulunga foordi is a very small stout spider. The male cephalothorax has a typical length of 1.8 mm (0.071 in) and a width of 1.5 mm (0.059 in). The male has a carapace that is dark brown and high, almost spherical. It has a large eye field covering more than half the carapace. Some of the eyes have tufts white hair between them, while there are some grey hairs on the edge of the carapace. The clypeus is somewhat high and brown. The chelicerae are stout and have two teeth at the front and one at the back. There is a short fang. The abdomen is even more rounded that the carapace, and red-brown. It is typically 1.4 mm (0.055 in) long and wide. The top is covered with a scutum and has some long hairs to the back. The underside is dark, nearly black. The legs are short, brown and hairy. The pedipalps are brown. There is a small lobe on the palpal bulb. The embolus is thin and coiled around with the tip pointing to the end of the cymbium. The structure of the pedipalps are reminiscent of the genius Euophrys, including the width of the embolus. The female has not been described.

== Distribution ==
Yimbulunga foordi is endemic to South Africa. The holotype was found in the oNgoye Forest of Kwa-Zulu Natal in 1983.
