= Nick Bailey (garden designer) =

British gardening presenter

Nick Bailey is a freelance horticulturalist, author, UK television gardening presenter and garden designer. He is a former head gardener at The Wicken. In 2010, he became head gardener at the Chelsea Physic Garden.

== Education ==
Bailey studied horticulture at Hadlow College continuing his studies there to obtain a degree in Landscape Design in 1995 awarded by the University of Greenwich.

== Career ==
Bailey is a Silver Gilt winner at the RHS Chelsea Flower Show. His first broadcasting job was presenting Gardens Wild and Wonderful in South Africa which he did in 1995 and 1996 after which he spent 4 years as a panellist on BBC Radio Norfolk’s programme, 'Garden Party'. Bailey has appeared on BBC Two’s Great British Garden Revival and Big Dreams Small Spaces, as well as ITV News and BBC One’s The One Show, BBC Radio 4’s Food Programme, and BBC Radio 2.

He is a regular contributor to Gardeners World. On February 8, 2018, he would record an episode on Gladiolus flowers found in the oNgoye Forest Reserve, South Africa, with Rod and Rachel Saunders; Bailey and his crew would be one of the last people to see the Saunders alive, as they would be abducted and murdered February 10. His film on plants associated with Shakespeare for Gardeners’ World won the best TV programme at the Garden Media Guild Awards 2016.

Bailey also worked as an editor for Garden Answers and Garden News, and as a freelance writer for BBC Gardeners’ World Magazine, RHS The Garden, The Mail, The Times and The Telegraph. He has regular columns in BBC Gardeners’ World Magazine and Garden News.

His first book, Chelsea Physic Garden – A Companion Guide was published in 2014. His second book 365 Days of Colour in your Garden was published by Kyle Books in 2015. His third book, Revive Your Garden was published in April 2018.
