= Yimbulunga =

Scientific classification
- Kingdom: Animalia
- Phylum: Arthropoda
- Subphylum: Chelicerata
- Class: Arachnida
- Order: Araneae
- Infraorder: Araneomorphae
- Family: Salticidae
- Genus: Yimbulunga; Wesołowska, Azarkina & Russell-Smith, 2014
- Species: Y. foordi

Binomial name
- Yimbulunga foordi Wesołowska, Azarkina & Russell-Smith, 2014

Genus of spiders

Yimbulunga is a monotypic genus of spiders in the family Salticidae. It was first described in 2014 by lead author Wanda Wesołowska, in a joint publication with Galina Azarkina and Anthony Russell-Smith. Its single described species Yimbulunga foordi is endemic to South Africa.

The species is named after South African arachnologist Stefan Hendrik Foord (1971-2023).
