= Murder of Rod and Rachel Saunders =

Botanists and horticulturists based in South Africa

- Rachel and Rod Saunders
- Location: oNgoye Forest, KwaZulu-Natal, South Africa
- Date: February 2018
- Attack type: Kidnapping, robbery and murder
- Deaths: 2
- Victims: Rodney Saunders and Rachel Saunders
- Convictions: Kidnapping, robbery with aggravating circumstances, theft and two counts of murder
- Convicted: Fatima Bibi Patel; Sayefudeen Aslam Del Vecchio; Musa Jackson
- Each defendant received two life sentences on 2 July 2026, with additional sentences for kidnapping, robbery and theft.

Rodney and Rachel Saunders were botanists, horticulturists and seed collectors based in Cape Town, South Africa. They held both British and South African citizenship and operated Silverhill Seeds, a business supplying seeds of indigenous South African plants. Their work included locating and photographing wild gladioli for Saunders' Field Guide to Gladioli of South Africa, published posthumously in 2021. They were kidnapped and murdered during a collecting trip in KwaZulu-Natal in February 2018. Three people were subsequently convicted of their murders and sentenced to life imprisonment in 2026.

== Murder and criminal proceedings ==
In February 2018, the couple travelled to KwaZulu-Natal on a plant-collecting expedition. Before reaching oNgoye Forest, they participated in filming for the BBC in the Drakensberg. They were subsequently kidnapped and robbed, and more than R700,000 was taken through transactions and withdrawals from their bank accounts. They were murdered and their bodies were disposed of in the Tugela River.

Rod's remains were recovered in February 2018 and identified through DNA testing in April. Police announced the identification of Rachel's remains in June 2018, following an investigation that included searches of mortuaries for unidentified bodies.

In June 2026, the KwaZulu-Natal High Court in Durban convicted Fatima Bibi Patel, Sayefudeen Aslam Del Vecchio and Musa Jackson of kidnapping, robbery with aggravating circumstances, theft and two counts of murder. On 2 July 2026, each received two life sentences for the murders, with additional sentences for kidnapping, robbery and theft.
