= ONgoye Forest =

Forest in KwaZulu-Natal, South Africa

Coordinates: 28°50′48″S 31°43′56″E

oNgoye Forest
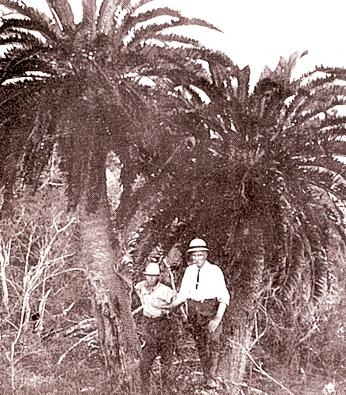
- Last two stems of Wood's cycad at oNgoye Forest, early 1900s
- Interactive map of oNgoye Forest

oNgoye Forest, also known as Ngoye or Ngoya Forest, is an ancient coastal scarp forest, protected by the oNgoye Forest Reserve in South Africa's KwaZulu-Natal province. The forest of almost 4,000 ha covers an extensive granite ridge that rises from 200 to 460 metres above sea level. It is found some 10 km inland, or 16 km by road, from the coastal town of Mtunzini, and adjoins smaller forest reserves on its periphery, namely Impeshulu in the west, Ezigwayini in the north, and Dengweni in the south.

== History and status ==
The Zulu king Mpande is the first known person to have afforded protection to oNgoye Forest in the 1800s. Commercial logging occurred in the forest between 1909 and 1924.

The area became an official conservation area in 1992. Cattle grazing, crop cultivation and limited utilization of trees however occur in the protected area, and the edge of the forest is subjected to periodic burning which may reduce the forest area.

In early February 2018, the oNgoye Forest Reserve would be the film site for an episode of the British gardening program Gardeners' World with Nick Bailey accompanied by Rod and Rachel Saunders on expedition for rare Gladiolus flowers. Shortly after filming ended, on February 10, the elderly Saunders would ambushed, murdered, and robbed.

== Significance ==
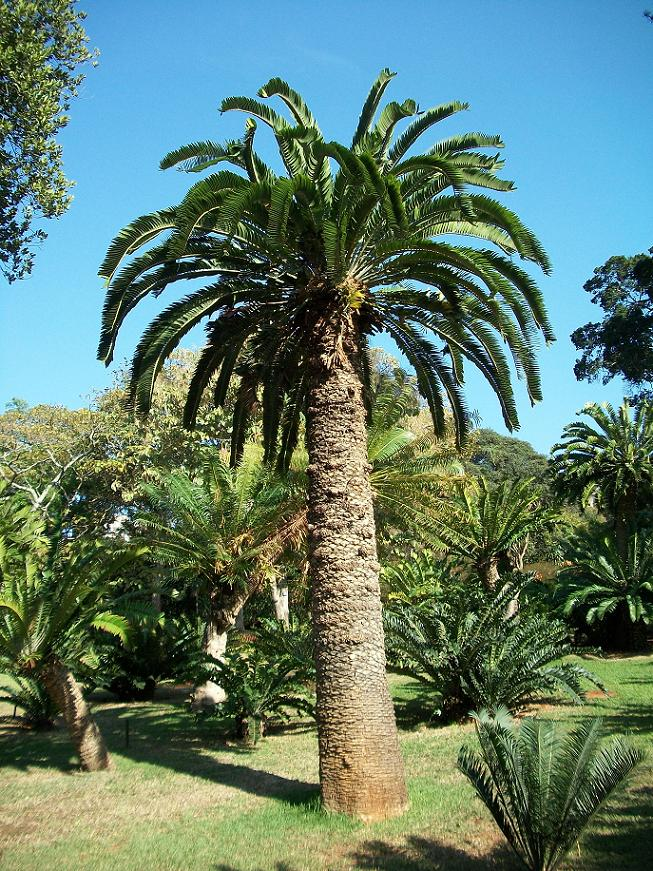
An original stem of Wood's cycad at the Durban Botanic Gardens, once endemic to oNgoye Forest

This relict patch of transitional Afromontane-coastal forest is home to rare and endemic species.

It was home to the giant Wood's cycad which is extinct in the wild since the early 1900s, but the oNgoye dwarf cycad, Ground cycad and Natal grass cycad still occur.

It is home to the endemic race ornatus of the Red bush squirrel, the endemic race woodwardi of Woodward's barbet, two undescribed dwarf chameleons similar to the Qudeni dwarf chameleon, the rare Forest green butterfly and the oNgoye centipede.

This forest is an important breeding area for the Eastern bronze-naped pigeon and home to the endangered Spotted ground thrush. At least 165 species of birds have been identified in the area.

Rare trees include Giant umzimbeet, Forest mangosteen, Forest waterberry, Giant pock ironwood, Zulu bead-string, Natal krantz ash, Natal elm and the Pondo fig. Besides the Pondo fig, another six species of Ficus occur. The Gladiolus species G. crassifolus, G. ecklonii, and G. microcarpus are also found in the area.

Bird species diversity and guild composition between the edge (5–10 m from the margin) of primary forest abutting grassland and the deep interior (above 500 m from the margin) in the Dngoye Forest Reserve were compared. Edge and interior sites were chosen that were homogeneous with respect to habitat physiognomy i.e. influences of habitat structure and complexity were insignificant. There were no statistical differences in bird species diversity between the forest edge and interior. However, there was significantly greater species turnover at the edge. The difference in bird species composition between the forest edge and interior was due to various edge-effects: removal of dead wood for firewood, soil compaction by cattle, and generally greater levels of disturbance. We question the wisdom of the generally applied edge-effect principle in the conservation of forest biodiversity. It was suggested that the principle be applied only once there has been critical appraisal of the extent, nature, and effect of an edge and a clear conservation objective with regard to forest birds.

== Safety ==
- Safety related history of Ngoye Forest KwaZulu-Natal

A tragic murder took place near the forest reserve. A slain botanist couple last chat was recorded before the couple went missing. The sister of slain botanist Rachel Saunders told the Durban high court the last time she interacted with her sister was via a Whatsapp chat before the couple's disappearance. Time from the fatalities until sentences where given in court was 14 years.

Edit: Fatalities occurred in 2018, more recently than 14 years ago as of 2026.

Reference: https://www.timeslive.co.za/news/south-africa/2023-04-25-sister-of-slain-botanist-recounts-last-chat-before-couple-went-missing/

== See also ==
- Forests of KwaZulu-Natal

== Bibliography ==
- Pooley, E. (1993). The Complete Field Guide to Trees of Natal, Zululand and Transkei, - ISBN 0-620-17697-0.
- Pooley, T. and Player, I. (1995). KwaZulu-Natal Wildlife Destinations. ISBN 1-86812-487-8.
