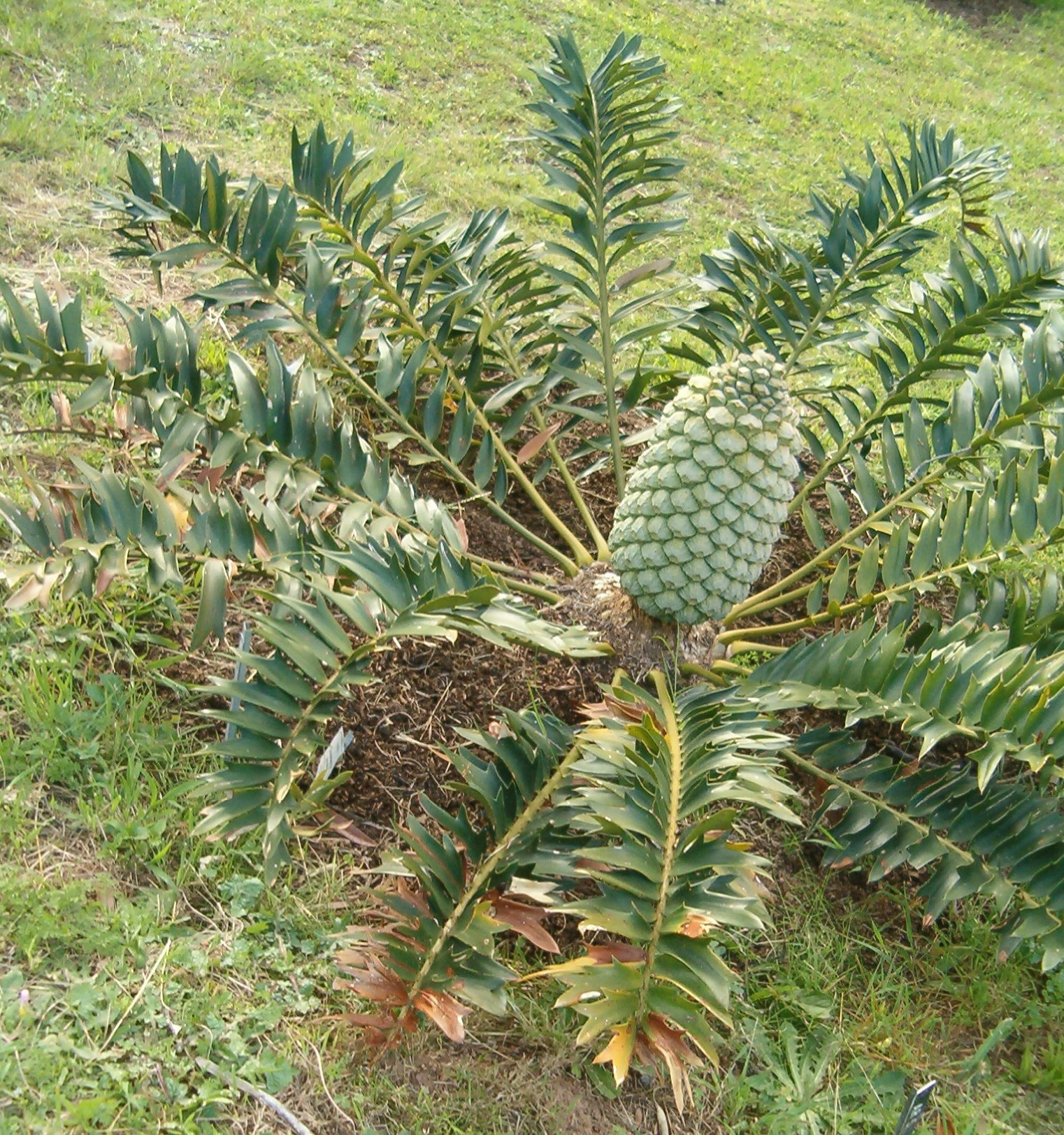

Conservation status
- Endangered (IUCN 3.1)
- CITES Appendix I

Scientific classification
- Kingdom: Plantae
- Clade: Embryophytes
- Clade: Tracheophytes
- Clade: Spermatophytes
- Clade: Gymnospermae
- Division: Cycadophyta
- Class: Cycadopsida
- Order: Cycadales
- Family: Zamiaceae
- Genus: Encephalartos
- Species: E. arenarius

Binomial name
- Encephalartos arenarius R.A. Dyer

= Encephalartos arenarius =

Species of cycad

Encephalartos arenarius is a species of cycad in the family Zamiaceae. It is endemic to South Africa, where it is limited to the Eastern Cape. Its common names include Alexandria cycad and dune cycad.

== Description ==
This plant has an egg-shaped stem partially buried in the ground, measuring 20-30 cm in diameter and reaching a height of one meter from the base. Its lanceolate leaves are 100 to 150 cm long, leathery, and arranged alternately along the stem. The base of the leaf stalk is smooth on one side and hairy on the other.

The plant is dioecious, with elongated male cones measuring 30–50 cm long and 8–15 cm in diameter, and cylindrical female cones measuring 35–60 cm long and 20–30 cm in diameter. The seeds are approximately spherical, with red sarcotesta, and 20-25 mm wide.

== Distribution ==
This species lives in densely wooded dune habitat and scrub. It is an endangered species with a maximum global population estimated at around 1500 mature individuals. Most subpopulations occur near the town of Alexandria, Eastern Cape. The main threat to the species is overcollection.

== Gallery ==
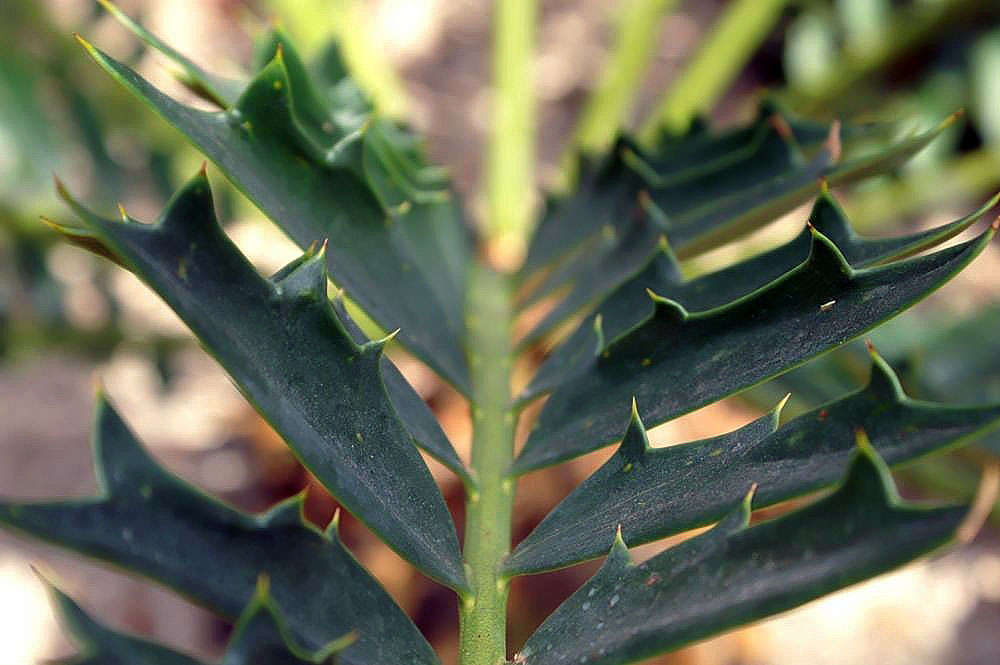
Detail of spine on leaf

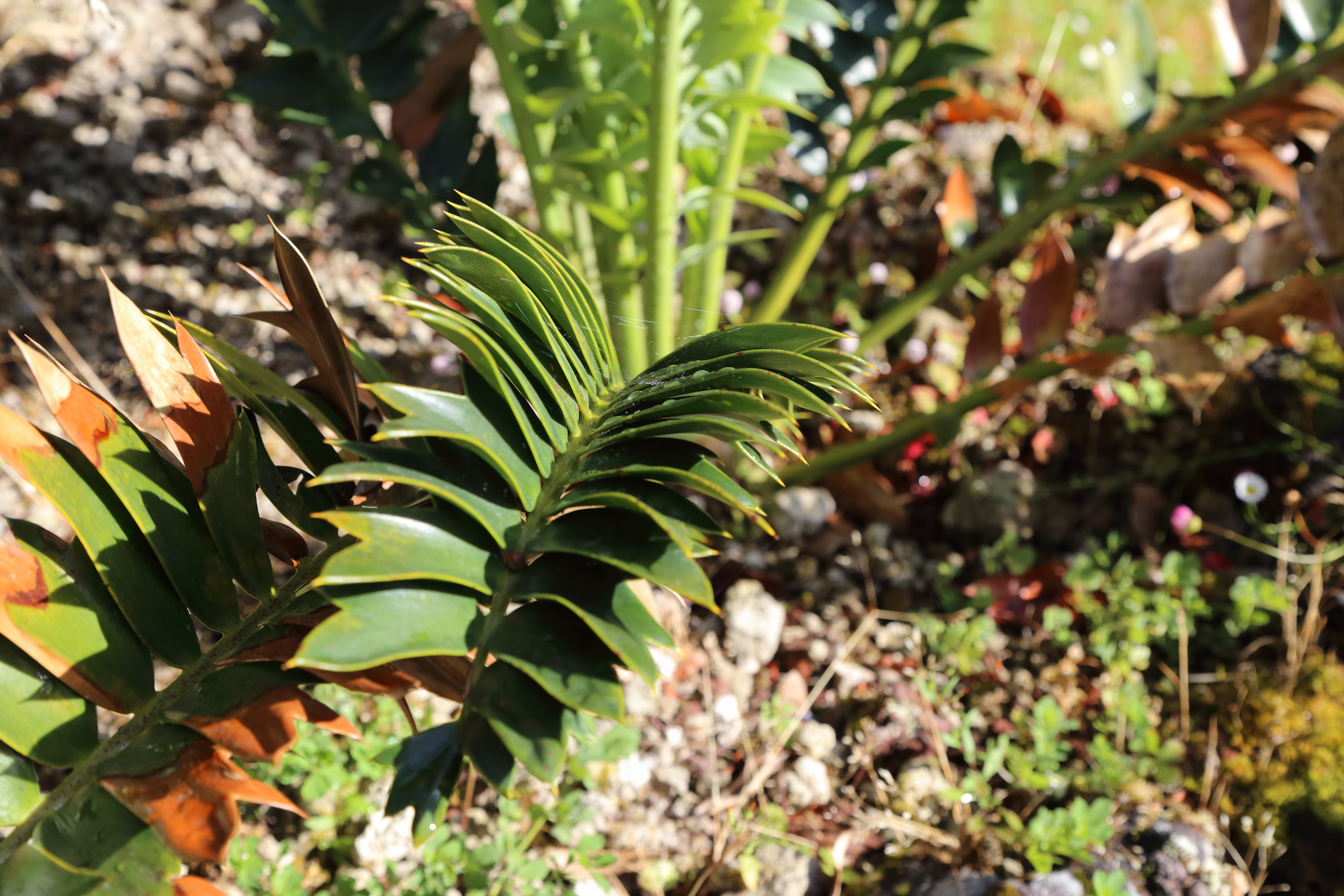
Leaves

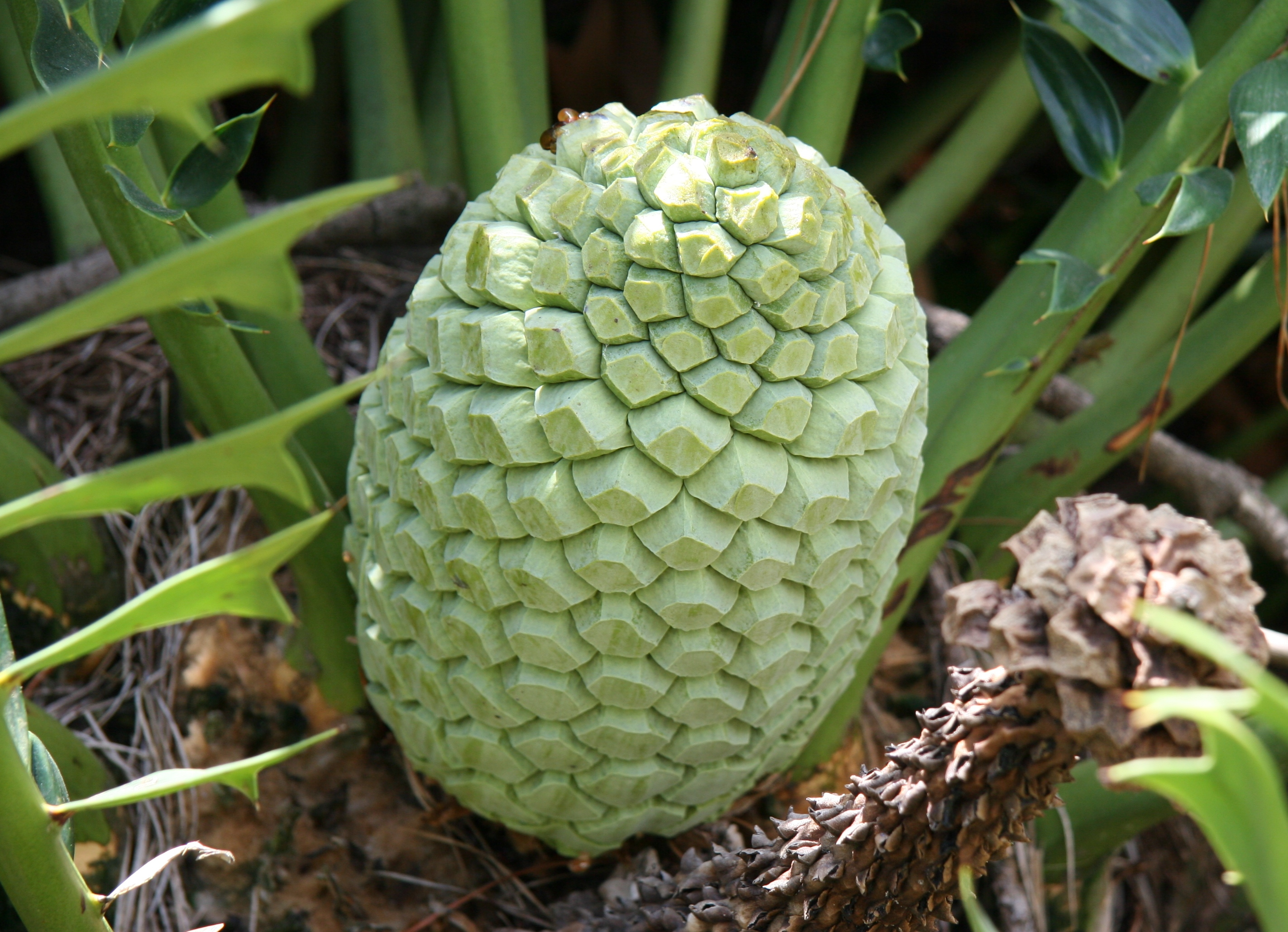
The cone

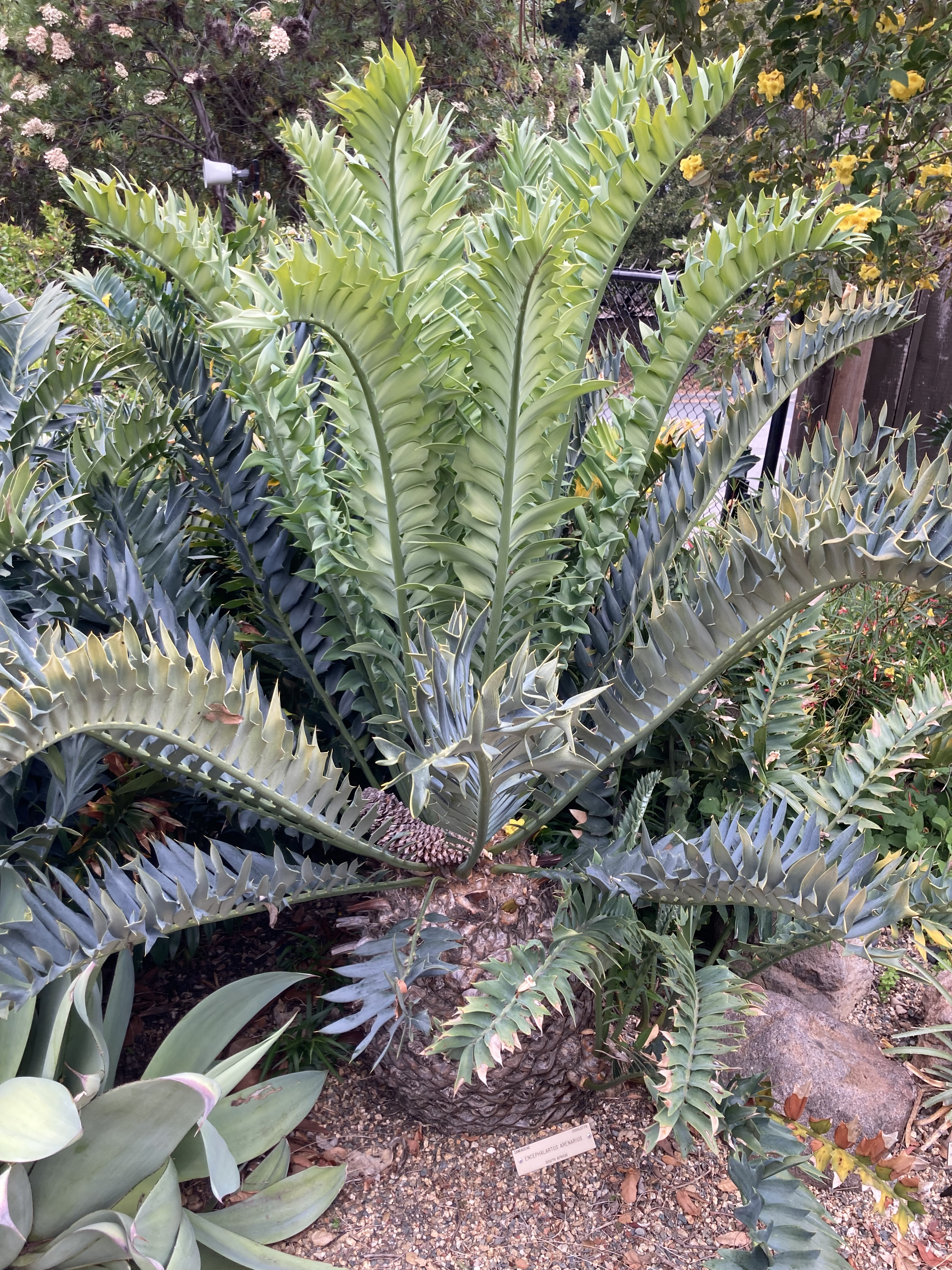
At UC Berkeley Botanical Garden
