= List of cycads of South Africa =

Seed producing vascular plants of the division Cycadophyta recorded from South Africa

This listing contains taxa of plants in the division Cycadophyta, recorded from South Africa. Cycads /ˈsaɪkædz/ are seed plants with a very long fossil history that were formerly more abundant and more diverse than they are today. They typically have a stout and woody (ligneous) trunk with a crown of large, hard and stiff, evergreen leaves. They usually have pinnate leaves. The species are dioecious, therefore the individual plants of a species are either male or female. Cycads vary in size from having trunks only a few centimeters to several meters tall. They typically grow very slowly and live very long, with some specimens known to be as much as 1,000 years old. Because of their superficial resemblance, they are sometimes mistaken for palms or ferns, but they are not closely related to either group.

Cycads are gymnosperms (naked seeded), meaning their unfertilized seeds are open to the air to be directly fertilized by pollination, as contrasted with angiosperms, which have enclosed seeds with more complex fertilization arrangements. Cycads have very specialized pollinators, usually a specific species of beetle. They have been reported to fix nitrogen in association with various cyanobacteria living in the roots (the "coralloid" roots). Cycads all over the world are in decline, with four species on the brink of extinction and seven species have fewer than 100 plants left in the wild.

23,420 species of vascular plant have been recorded in South Africa, making it the sixth most species-rich country in the world and the most species-rich country on the African continent. Of these, 153 species are considered to be threatened. Nine biomes have been described in South Africa: Fynbos, Succulent Karoo, desert, Nama Karoo, grassland, savanna, Albany thickets, the Indian Ocean coastal belt, and forests.

The 2018 South African National Biodiversity Institute's National Biodiversity Assessment plant checklist lists 35,130 taxa in the phyla Anthocerotophyta (hornworts (6)), Anthophyta (flowering plants(33534)), Bryophyta (mosses (685)), Cycadophyta (cycads (42)), Lycopodiophyta (Lycophytes(45)), Marchantiophyta (liverworts (376)), Pinophyta (conifers (33)), and Pteridophyta {cryptograms(408)).

== Listing ==
- Cycas madagascariensis Miq.
- Encephalartos aemulans Vorster, endemic
- Encephalartos afer (Thunb.) Lehm. endemic
- Encephalartos altensteinii Lehm. endemic
- Encephalartos arenarius R.A.Dyer, endemic
- Encephalartos brevifoliolatus Vorster, endemic
- Encephalartos cerinus Lavranos & D.L.Goode, endemic
- Encephalartos cupidus R.A.Dyer, endemic
- Encephalartos cycadifolius (Jacq.) Lehm. endemic
- Encephalartos dolomiticus Lavranos & D.L.Goode, endemic
- Encephalartos dyerianus Lavranos & D.L.Goode, endemic
- Encephalartos eugene-maraisii I.Verd. endemic
- Encephalartos eugene-maraisii I.Verd. subsp. middelburgensis Lavranos & D.L.Goode
- Encephalartos ferox G.Bertol. indigenous
- Encephalartos friderici-guilielmi Lehm. endemic
- Encephalartos ghellinckii Lem. endemic
- Encephalartos heenanii R.A.Dyer. indigenous
- Encephalartos hirsutus P.J.H.Hurter, endemic
- Encephalartos horridus (Jacq.) Lehm. endemic
- Encephalartos humilis I.Verd. endemic
- Encephalartos inopinus R.A.Dyer, endemic
- Encephalartos laevifolius Stapf & Burtt Davy, indigenous
- Encephalartos lanatus Stapf & Burtt Davy, endemic
- Encephalartos latifrons Lehm. endemic
- Encephalartos lebomboensis I.Verd. indigenous
- Encephalartos lehmannii Lehm. endemic
- Encephalartos longifolius (Jacq.) Lehm. endemic
- Encephalartos middelburgensis Vorster, Robbertse & S.van der Westh. endemic
- Encephalartos msinganus Vorster, endemic
- Encephalartos natalensis R.A.Dyer & I.Verd. endemic
- Encephalartos ngoyanus I.Verd. indigenous
- Encephalartos nubimontanus P.J.H.Hurter, endemic
- Encephalartos paucidentatus Stapf & Burtt Davy, indigenous
- Encephalartos princeps R.A.Dyer, endemic
- Encephalartos senticosus Vorster, indigenous
- Encephalartos transvenosus Stapf & Burtt Davy, endemic
- Encephalartos trispinosus (Hook.) R.A.Dyer, endemic
- Encephalartos umbeluziensis R.A.Dyer (Encephalartos striatus Stapf & Burtt Davy)
- Encephalartos venetus Vorster
- Encephalartos villosus Lem. indigenous
- Encephalartos woodii Sander, endemic
- Stangeria eriopus (Kunze) Baill. indigenous
