= Bvumba Mountains =

Mountain range on the Zimbabwe–Mozambique border

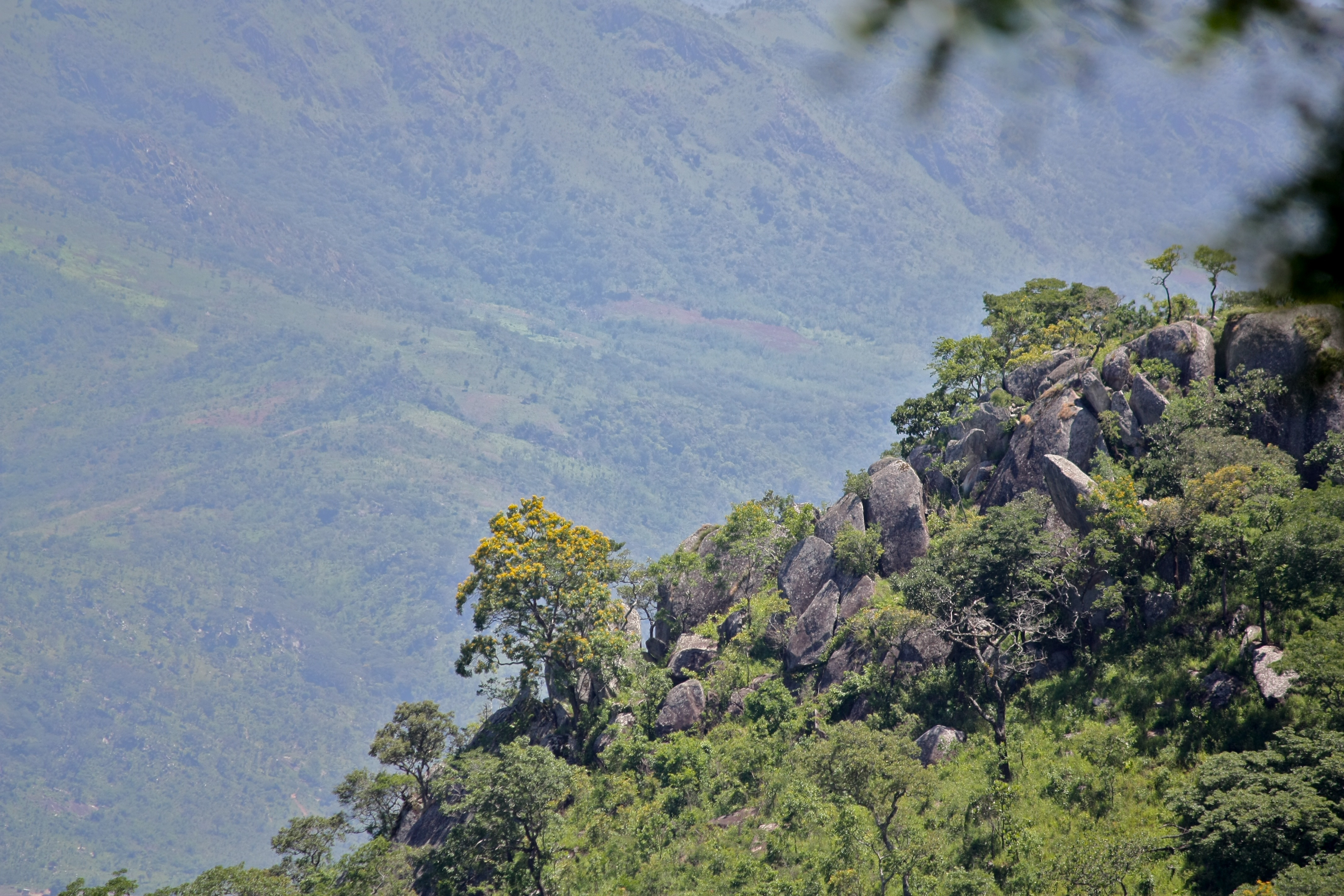
- Slopes of Mount Vumba in Mozambique

Highest point
- Elevation: 1,911 m (6,270 ft) at Castle Beacon
- Coordinates: 19°06′00″S 32°47′00″E

Geography
- Location within Africa
- Location: Zimbabwe - Mozambique

Climbing
- Easiest route: Hike

The Bvumba Mountains or Vumba Mountains straddle the Zimbabwe–Mozambique border, and lie some 10 km southeast of the city of Mutare. The Bvumba rise to Castle Beacon at 1,911 metres, and are, together with the Chimanimani Mountains to the south and Nyanga Mountains to the north, part of the Eastern Highlands of the Manicaland and adjacent Manica provinces. They are referred to as the "Mountains of the Mist" (Bvumba being the Shona word for "mist"), as so often the early morning starts with a mist which clears by mid-morning. Although lying mostly within Zimbabwe, the mountains extend north-eastward to Mount Vumba (or Monte Vumba) in Mozambique. They are capped by cool, green hills which shelter country hotels, a casino and golf course at the Leopard Rock Hotel and a Botanical Garden with one of the best views in Africa. The mountains are also known for their coffee plantations.

== Access ==
On the Zimbabwean side, the Mountains are accessible by a tarred road from Mutare. The Mozambican side of the mountains can be reached from a road to the Vumba Water Bottling Plant, which leaves the main EN6 highway just west of Manica.

== Mountain hikes ==
The climb to the prominence, Castle Beacon, is up a large granite dome. The lower slopes form a mist belt with sub-montane vegetation. Proteas are found on the higher levels. Vumba Mountain, on the Mozambique side, is a steep hike to a summit with a good view of Manica and environs.

== Geology ==
The Bvumba Mountains are composed mainly of granite which forms the eastern margin of the Zimbabwe Craton. The Vumba granite has been dated at over 2,600 Ma. The granites are intruded in places by Umkondo dolerite sills which are dated to about 1,110 Ma.

== Flora ==
The mountains are dominated by savannah woodland, including Brachystegia / miombo. There are also extensive sub-montane grasslands, local mist-belts with mosses and epiphytic and lithophytic ferns and sub-montane evergreen forest in the deeper ravines. The higher levels of the mountains are sparsely vegetated with shrubs such as proteas, aloes and Strelitzia.

In the centre of the mountains lies the Bunga Forest Botanical Reserve and neighbouring Bvumba Botanical Garden. The latter is landscaped around a number of small streams and includes an important cycad collection, with 59 of the 189 known species, including Encephalartos manikensis, E. ferox, E. lehmannii, E. pterogonus, E. cycadifolius and E. eugene-maraisii.

== Fauna ==
Although small in area, the mountains are a botanical paradise and home to some of the rarest butterflies in the region. The Bvumba mountains offer exciting and varied birding opportunities. The area is probably best known as one of the main breeding areas of Swynnerton's robin which lives and breeds in small patches of forest, some on private land, others within the Bunga forest. Livingstone's turacos are present in large numbers. Their territorial calls are typically heard long before they are seen, yet their brilliant crimson wing feathers are striking from afar as they glide from one patch of canopy to another. A smaller number of mammals inhabit the Bvumba, perhaps the most notable of which are the leopard and the samango monkey, the latter's range being very limited. Savannah woodland adjoining the Mozambique side of the range is home to several rare reptiles including Marshall's leaf chameleon and Arnold's skink.

== Archaeology ==
Chinhamapere Hill, on the Mozambique side of the mountains, has been a culturally important site since the Iron Age. There are well-preserved hunter-gatherer rock art paintings (comprising several human figures, some holding bows and arrows and others in trance) thought to be of around 8,000 years in age, as well as contemporary ritual sites, used for rainmaking, divining and healing. There are at least 86 Stone Age sites in the Zimbabwean portion of the mountains, and the cultural significance of some of these are still observed at the present time.

== World Heritage Status ==
This site was added to the UNESCO World Heritage Tentative List on August 20, 2008, in the Cultural category. It was proposed by Mozambique.

== Places of special interest ==
- Bunga Forest Botanical Reserve
- Manchester Gardens – a landscaped garden with the Reserve arranged about a series of artificially created streams and dams
- Elim Mission Memorial – a plaque at the start of the Eagle School Road - to the memory of the innocent victims of the Elim Mission Massacre 1978
- Leopard Rock Hotel – a golf resort and casino
- The Refuge or Castle – now a sunset balcony for Leopard Rock Hotel guests and a wedding venue
- Leopard Rock
- Chinziwa Scout Park
- Kwayedza Lodge
- Cloudlands
- Cripps Family Burial Plot
- White Horse Inn – at the end of the tar on Lauranceville Road
- Map-off – a place with various fauna and flora overlooking the border
- Prince of Wales view – a cliff that overlooks Forbes border post near Cloudlands
- Castle beacon or Bvumba Heights, situated 1,900 m above sea level
