= Bunga Forest Botanical Reserve =

- IUCN category IV (habitat/species management area)
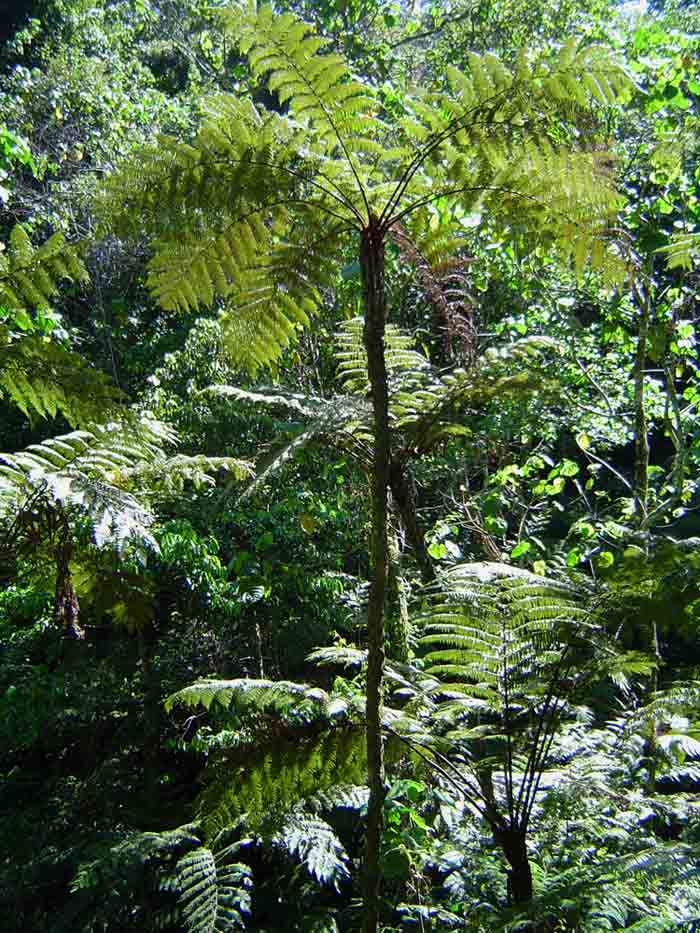
- Spiny tree ferns (Cyathea manniana) in Bunga Forest

- Location within Zimbabwe
- Coordinates: 19°07′59″S 32°45′09″E
- Area: 4.95 km^{2} (1.91 sq mi)
- Designation: Botanical reserve
- Designated: 1975

The Bunga Forest Botanical Reserve conserves mist-forest along the southern slopes of the Bvumba Mountains in the Eastern Highlands of Zimbabwe. It is the largest conserved area in the Bvumba highlands, and can be accessed from various points along the circuitous Burma Valley Road. The forest was logged for timber up to the mid 20th century.

== Flora ==
Syzygium guineense predominates the primary forest, and Dracaena fragrans is common in its shaded undershrub. Pioneer plants include Aphloia theiformis, Macaranga mellifera and Maesa lanceolata. Albizia gummifera and A. schimperiana dominate the lower slopes and western rain shadow. Bracken-briar on the forest verges is populated by Pteridium aquilinum, Smilax anceps, Buddleja salviifolia, besides Vangueria and Vernonia species.

== Fauna ==
Marshall's pygmy chameleon is present, as is several range-restricted birds, including Swynnerton's robin, Stripe-cheeked greenbul, Chirinda apalis and White-tailed crested-flycatcher.

== Vicinity ==
The Vumba Botanical Gardens, Leopard Rock Hotel, White Horse Inn, Seldomseen Cottages, Genaina Guest House and coffee shop are all in its immediate vicinity. Banti Forest Reserve is situated some 22 km to the south.
