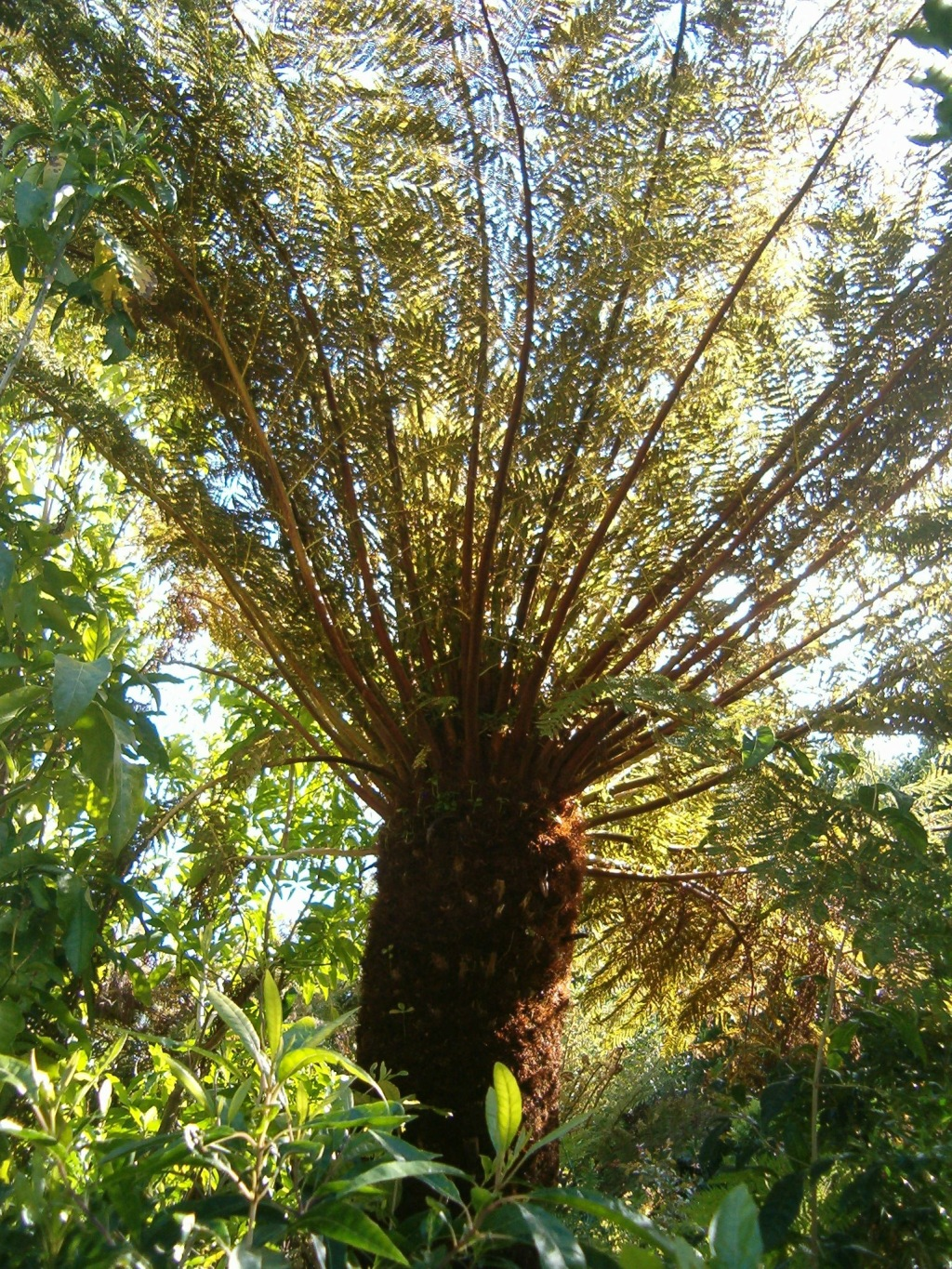
- Growing in Kirstenbosch National Botanical Garden

Conservation status
- Least Concern (IUCN 3.1)

Scientific classification
- Kingdom: Plantae
- Clade: Tracheophytes
- Division: Polypodiophyta
- Class: Polypodiopsida
- Order: Cyatheales
- Family: Cyatheaceae
- Genus: Alsophila
- Species: A. dregei

Binomial name
- Alsophila dregei (Kunze) R.M.Tryon

Synonyms
- Alsophila baronii Baker; Cyathea angolensis Welw.; Cyathea baronii (Baker) Domin; Cyathea burkei Hook.; Cyathea dregei Kunze; Cyathea flavovirens Kuhn ex Diels; Cyathea polyphlebia Baker; Cyathea segregata Baker

= Alsophila dregei =

Species of fern

Alsophila dregei, synonym Cyathea dregei, (common tree fern or gewone boomvaring in Afrikaans) is a widespread species of tree fern in southern Africa.

Within South Africa, it co-occurs with the indigenous forest tree fern (Gymnosphaera capensis) and the invasive Sphaeropteris cooperi from Australia. Further north, outside of South Africa, it coexists with an additional two tree fern species, A. manniana and A. thomsonii.

This species is locally known as the common South African tree fern or grassland tree fern (in contrast to its relative, the forest tree fern). It is commonly known as the gewone boomvaring in Afrikaans.

== Description ==
=== Key characteristics ===
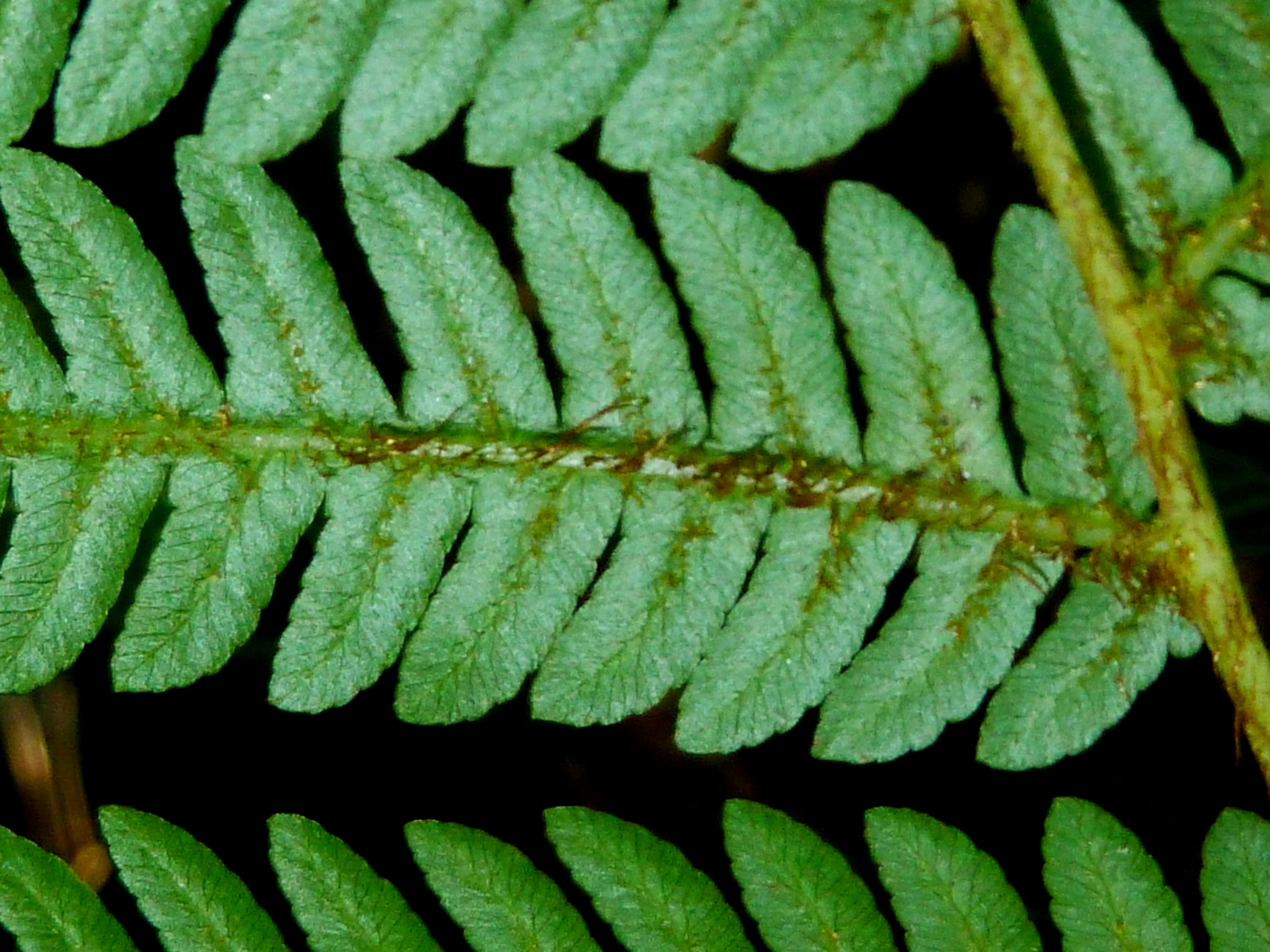
The smallest leaflets have distinctively smooth (entire) margins

Alsophila dregei has an erect, stout trunk and is up to 5 metres (16 ft) tall and 20–45 cm in diameter. It is a variable species, usually having a thick trunk and dense crown. It is occasionally branched. Fronds are tripinnate (rarely bipinnate) and may reach 3 m in length. They are characteristically large and arching, with the lowest pinnae usually reduced. The upper surface of fronds is glabrate, while the lower surface may be tomentose. The rachis and stipe are brown in colouration and have a rough surface. The stipe is covered in brown scales. Up to twelve sori occur per group per pinnule.

=== Comparison to other tree ferns ===
It can be distinguished from the forest tree fern (Gymnosphaera capensis) by its thick trunk, and by its smallest (third level) leaflets. The leaflets of A. dregei have smooth (entire) margins, while those of G. capensis are serrated. Each leaflet of A. dregei has multiple seedcases on its underside, while a leaflet of G. capensis has only one per leaflet. The fronds of A. capensis come off lower, and it usually has several small, residual leaf remnants, which sprout in tufts among its fronds at the top of its stem.

The only other indigenous tree ferns of the southern African region, Alsophila manniana and A. thomsonii, are both native to Zimbabwe. They can be distinguished from A. dregei by stem, stalk and frond appearance. A. manniana has sharp spikes on a slender trunk and frond stems. A. thomsonii has light-coloured, twisted hairs under its leaflets.

The invasive Sphaeropteris cooperi can be distinguished from A. dregei by the hairy white and brown scales on the new unfurling leaf stipes and sometimes by faint serrations on the leaflets.

== Taxonomy ==
The specific epithet dregei commemorates Johann Franz Drège (1794–1881), a German plant collector and explorer who worked extensively in South Africa and who is referred to as Drège when citing botanical names.

== Distribution and habitat ==
It is distributed widely in sub-Saharan Africa, including Guinea, Sierra Leone, Ghana, Nigeria, and Cameroon in west and west-central Africa, and in eastern and southern Africa from the Democratic Republic of the Congo and Uganda to South Africa. It is also native to Madagascar. In West Africa it grows in mountain and plateau grasslands and woodlands from 2,500–7,400 feet (760–2,260 m) elevation.

Alsophila dregei grows on stream banks, in forest margins and in grasslands. It often grows in the open, in full, direct sunlight, provided there is sufficient moisture. Plants are most common at elevations of 900–1,800 metres (3,000–5,900 ft). In the wild, it is known to be fire resistant.

== Cultivation ==
Alsophila dregei is rarely common in cultivation as an ornamental plant, especially in South Africa and Australia. Plants should be sheltered and grown in rich humus, with a constant supply of moisture. This species can survive light frosts with little damage.

== Gallery ==
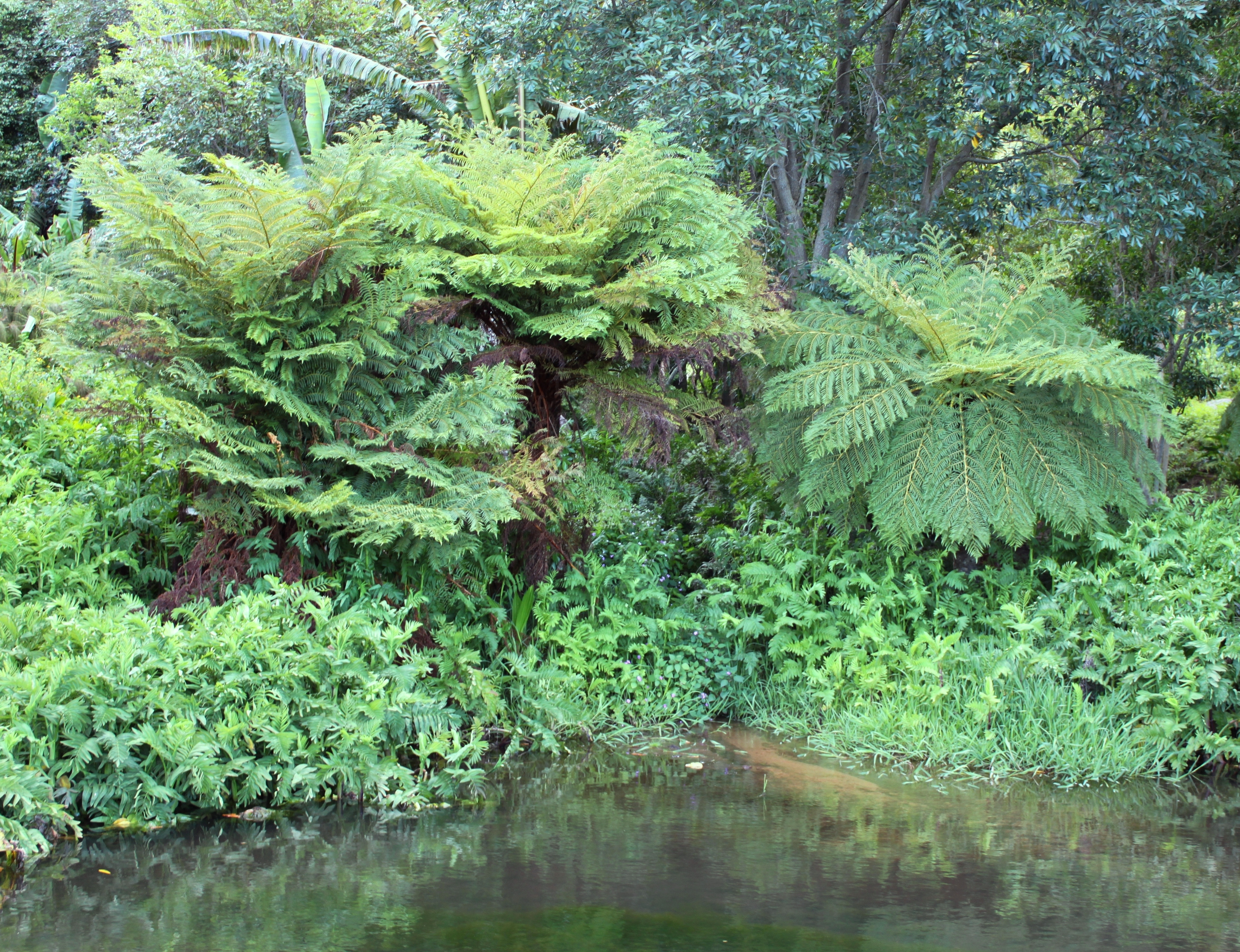
Habitat

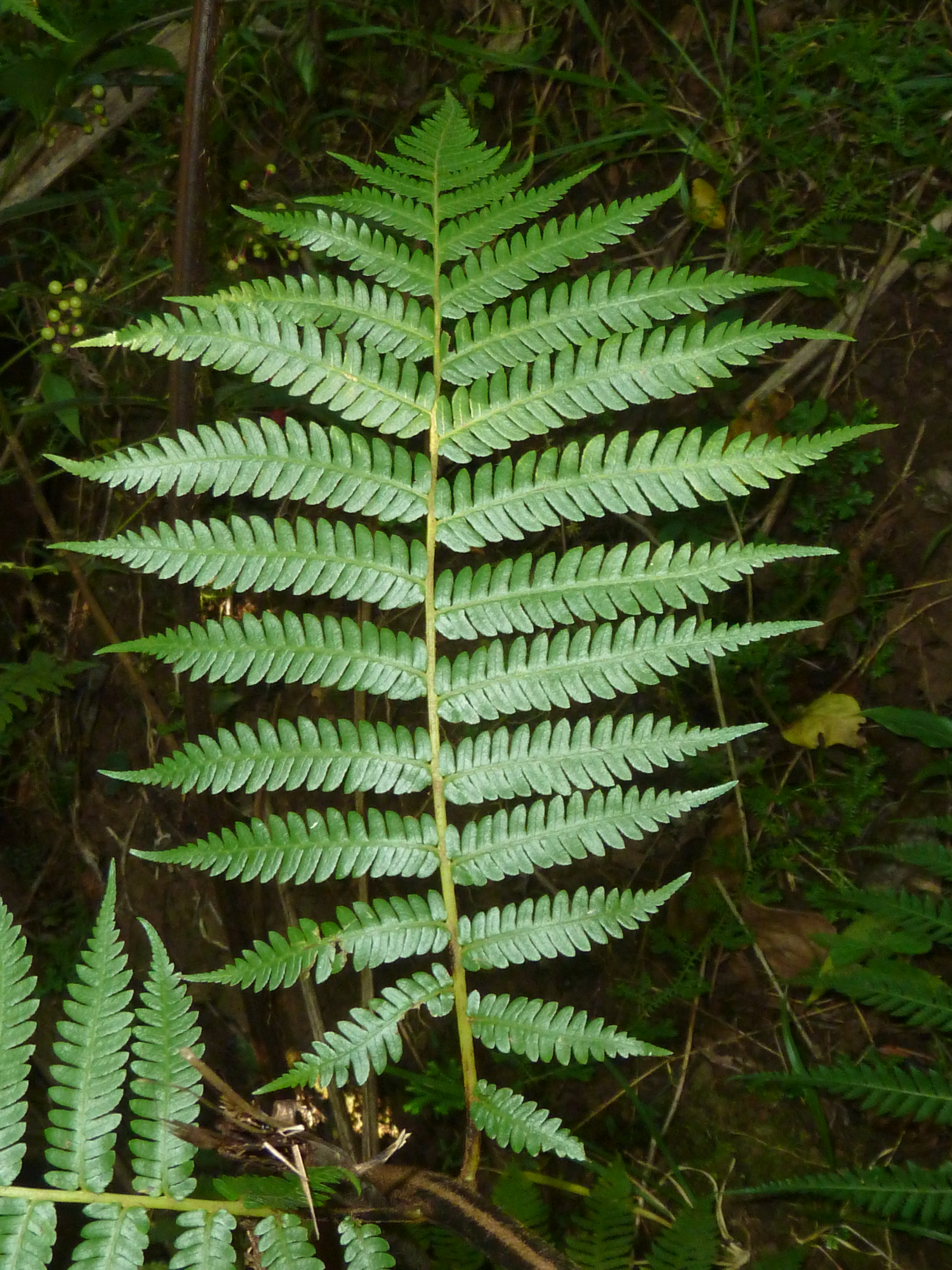
Tripinnate frond

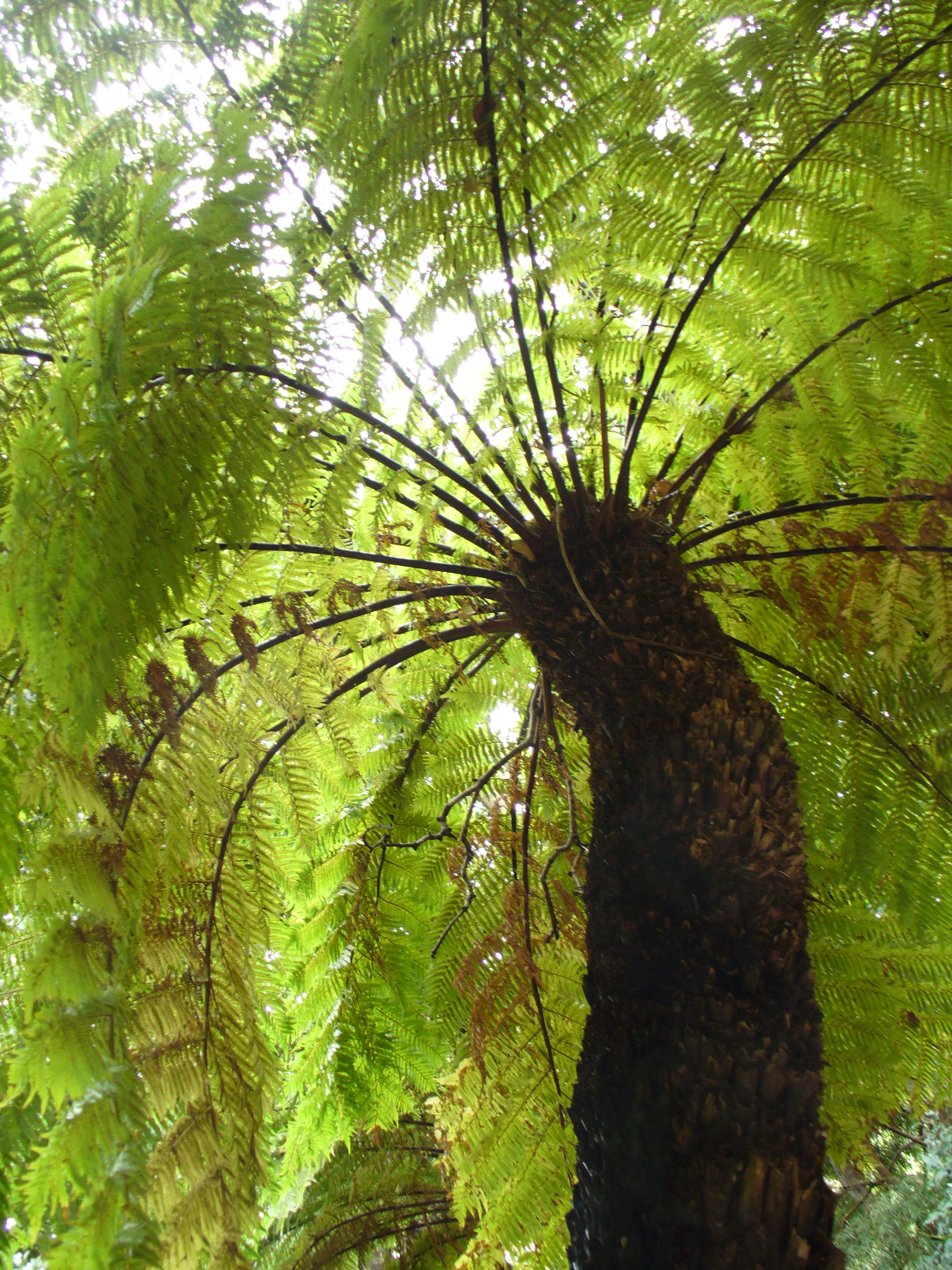
Mature trunk

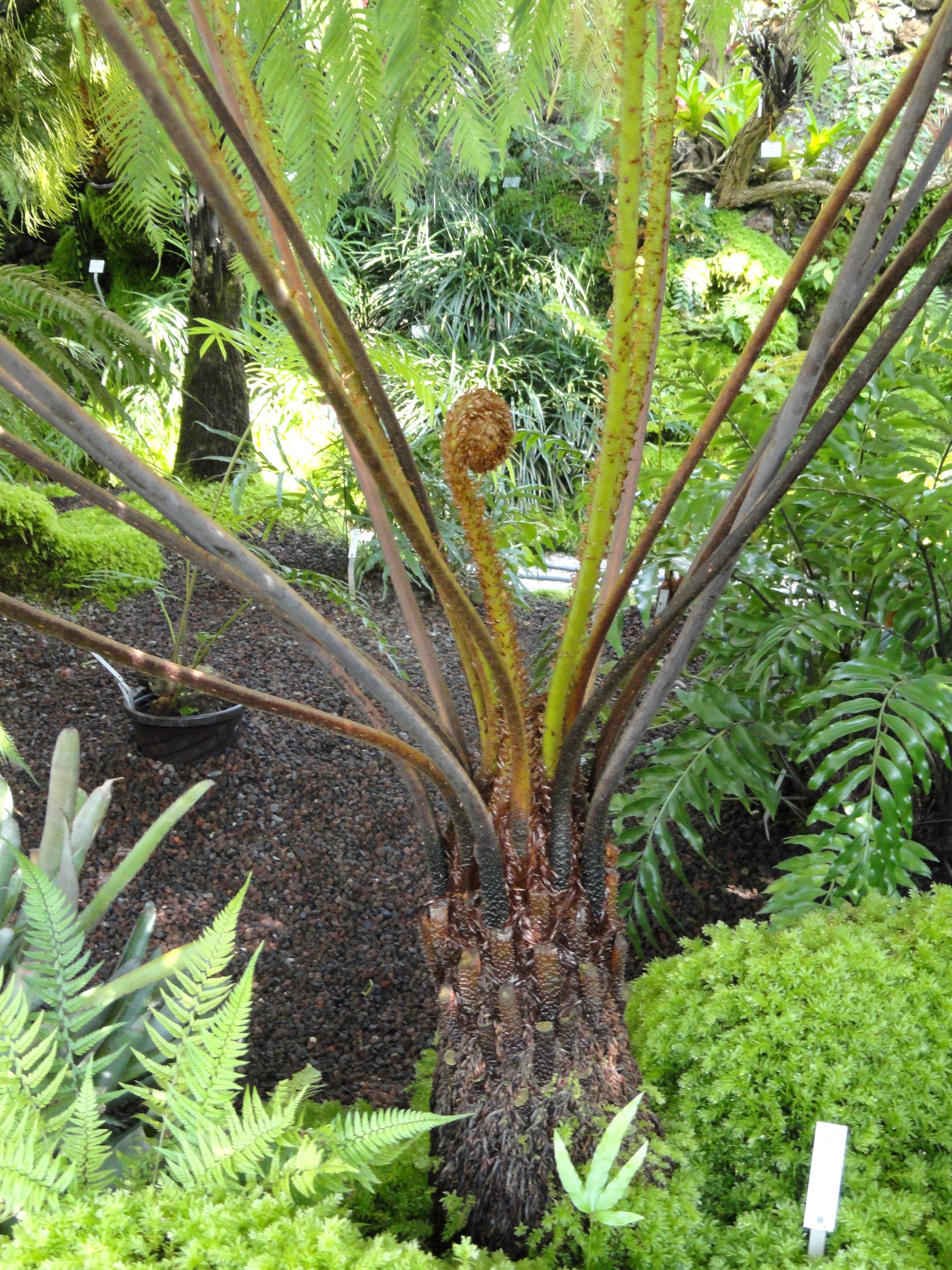
New fronds
