= Vumba massacre =

Massacre during the Rhodesian Bush War

Coordinates: 19°05′33″S 32°43′04″E

- Part of Rhodesian Bush War
- The bodies of two of the children, Rebecca Evans and Joy McCann, together with one of the women, Mary Fisher.
- Location: Bvumba Mountains, Rhodesia
- Date: 23 June 1978
- Deaths: 12
- Injuries: 1
- Victim: Missionaries of the Elim Pentecostal Church
- Perpetrator: Zimbabwe African National Liberation Army (ZANLA)

The Vumba massacre (also known as the Elim Mission massacre) was a massacre of eight British Christian missionaries and four children committed by ZANLA guerrillas during the Rhodesian Bush War on 23 June 1978. The missionaries belonged to the Elim Pentecostal Mission based in the Vumba mountains near the Mozambican border in Rhodesia. Time magazine characterised this attack as "the most savage assault on whites in Rhodesia's history."

== Events ==
The guerrillas separated White Christian missionaries and their relatives from the rest of the camp and axed, battered or bayoneted them to death. Black teachers and students were told that "some White staff have been arrested" and ordered not to report the incident to the authorities. The victims included three couples, two single women, three children and a 3-week-old baby. All of the victims were British citizens. Four of the five women had been raped, and one woman was found with an axe in her back. Three children were discovered lying dead next to a woman in pyjamas.

One woman who was beaten and dragged away survived after being found in a serious condition on the next day, she died a week later in hospital. The only White resident who avoided the attack altogether had hidden himself after being warned by a Black servant.

== Context and aftermath ==
Since 1972, nearly 40 missionaries had been killed before the Vumba massacre, and only two days after it, two German Jesuits were killed west of Salisbury. The Vumba massacre was the single worst attack on Europeans and church representatives in Rhodesia.

The site of the massacre, the former Eagle School buildings which were used by the Elim Mission, were subsequently taken over by the ZANU–PF and used as a training camp, while access was restricted for others.

According to a 2017 report in The Sunday Telegraph, government cables indicated that the British Prime Minister James Callaghan received credible information that Robert Mugabe's forces were behind the massacre, but they decided to ignore the issue to avoid disrupting the on-going peace talks.

== See also ==
- Musami massacre, 1977 killing of missionaries in Rhodesia
- Adolph Schmitt, Roman Catholic bishop emeritus murdered in Rhodesia
- Johanna Decker, missionary murdered in Rhodesia
