= Eagle School =

Coordinates: 19°05′33″S 32°43′04″E

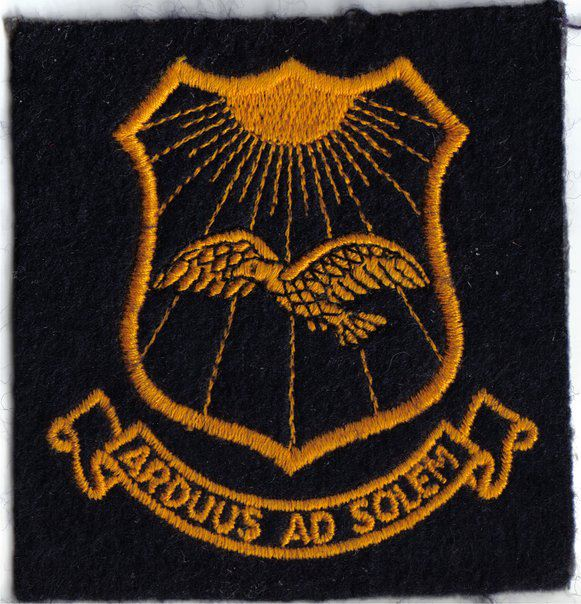
- Eagle School badge

Location
- Vumba Mountains; Manicaland; Zimbabwe

Information
- Type: Independent, preparatory boarding school
- Motto: Arduus Ad Solem (Latin: Striving towards the Sun)
- Established: 1948 (77 years ago)
- Closed: 1976 (49 years ago)
- Gender: Boys
- Age range: 7–14
- Houses: Martins; Swallows; Swifts
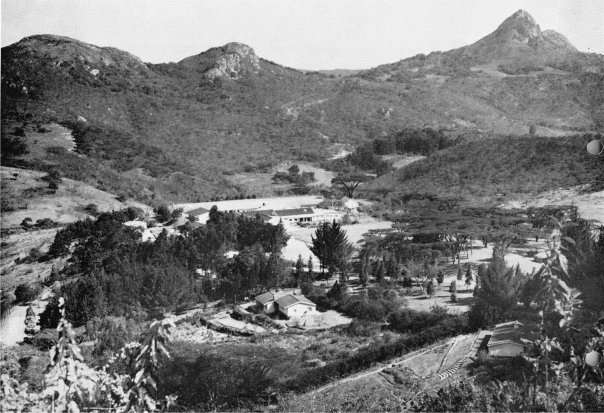
- View of Eagle School from the access road

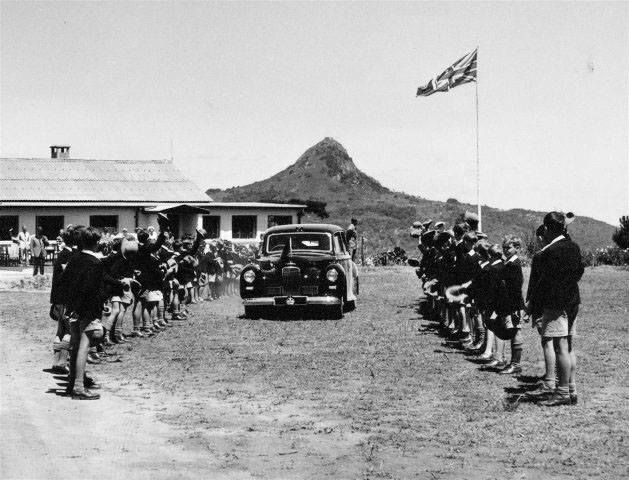
Queen Elizabeth The Queen Mother visiting in 1956

Eagle School was an independent, preparatory boarding school for boys aged 7 to 14 years situated in the Vumba Mountains near Umtali, Rhodesia (now Mutare, Zimbabwe).

The school was founded in 1948 and closed in 1976. The remaining pupils were then integrated into Springvale School. In his 2006 memoir, journalist and human rights activist Geoffrey Nyarota described the school as a "prestigious institution for wealthy white boys". Eagle was one of the nine founding members of the Conference of Heads of Independent Schools in Zimbabwe (CHISZ) as it was formed in the 1950s.

== Motto ==
The school's motto was Arduus Ad Solem, a Latin phrase which means "Striving towards the Sun". The school shared the motto with the former Victoria University of Manchester (now the University of Manchester, but has a different motto) and the Dragon School, a co-educational, preparatory school in Oxford, England.

== Sports and houses ==
The school had sports facilities and participation in rugby, cricket, soccer, athletics and swimming was compulsory with tennis being the exception. Rival schools were Chancellor Junior School, UBHS, Carmel, Baring, Vumba Heights and John Cowie. The school was divided into three sports houses – Swifts, Swallows and Martins.

== Cultural activities ==
Activities included an archaeology club, horse riding, music and the Young Farmers Club. Plays, film screenings and concerts were regular term events.

== Closure and integration into Springvale ==
Eagle was precariously placed in its mountainous home because of the security situation and its proximity to Mozambique. The school had approached the Springvale School board "in general terms" on a previous occasion about the possibility of a move and, in March 1976, met specifically to ask if Springvale would consider taking on the pupils and staff who remained after Eagle had officially closed in the Vumba Mountains. Eagle Headmaster Michael Hammond, who had taught at Springvale for many years before moving to Eagle, was faced with an agonising decision: to close completely or to move the school somewhere where "we could continue to preserve our identity for the rest of the year". Thus, Eagle joined the ranks of Springvale at the opening of the second term 1976. Springvale temporarily benefitted from the influx of seventy Eagle boys but circumstances beyond the school's control forced it to close in 1979.

== Post closure ==
The school site was subsequently taken over by the Elim Mission Society. On the night of the 23 June 1978, twelve members of the mission were murdered by members of the ZANU–PF (Zimbabwe African National Union – Patriotic Front) in the Vumba massacre. The site was taken over by the ZANU PF and access to it is restricted. It was later turned into a private college named Eagle Private College for Secretarial Studies for girls.

== List of heads ==
Between 1948 and 1976, the school had only four headmasters:

- Frank Cary (1948–1953)
- Claude Mellor (1953–1968)
- Richard Moore (1968–1973)
- Michael Hammond (1973–1976)

== See also ==
- Education in Zimbabwe
- List of boarding schools
- List of schools in Zimbabwe
