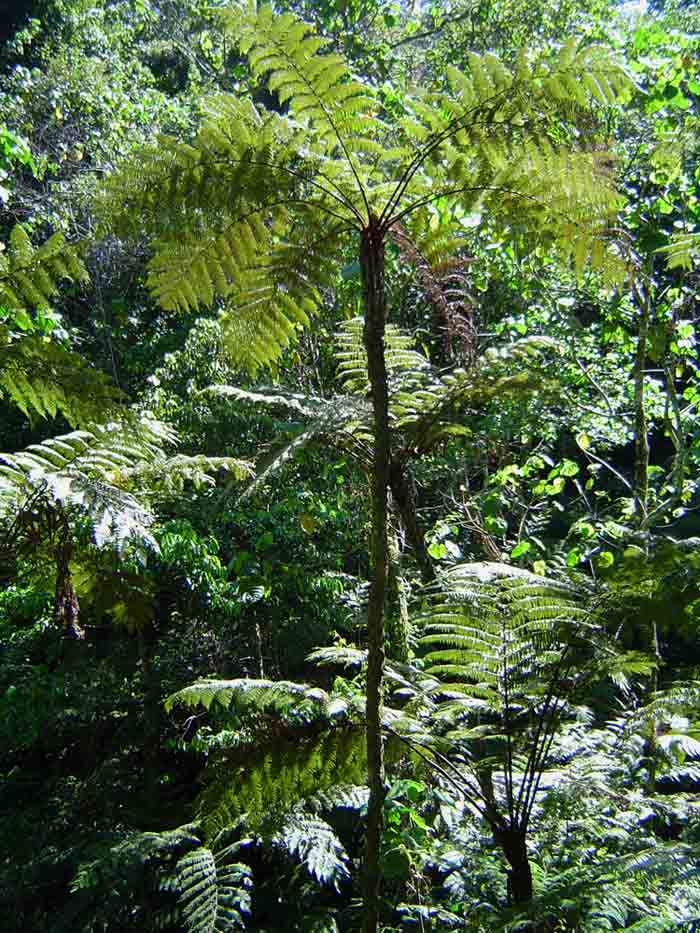
- Habit in Bunga Forest, Zimbabwe

Conservation status
- Least Concern (IUCN 3.1)

Scientific classification
- Kingdom: Plantae
- Clade: Tracheophytes
- Division: Polypodiophyta
- Class: Polypodiopsida
- Order: Cyatheales
- Family: Cyatheaceae
- Genus: Alsophila
- Species: A. manniana

Binomial name
- Alsophila manniana (William Hooker) R.M.Tryon

Synonyms
- Cyathea engleri Hieron.; Cyathea laurentiorum Christ; Cyathea manniana Hook.; Cyathea manniana var. preussii (Diels) Tardieu; Cyathea preussii Diels; Cyathea sellae Pirotta; Cyathea usambarensis Hieron.

= Alsophila manniana =

Spiny tree fern

Species of plant

Alsophila manniana, synonym Cyathea manniana, the spiny tree fern or sheshino, is a species of tree fern. It is readily identified by the fierce spines on its trunk, and is widespread in the tropical regions of Africa.

== Description ==
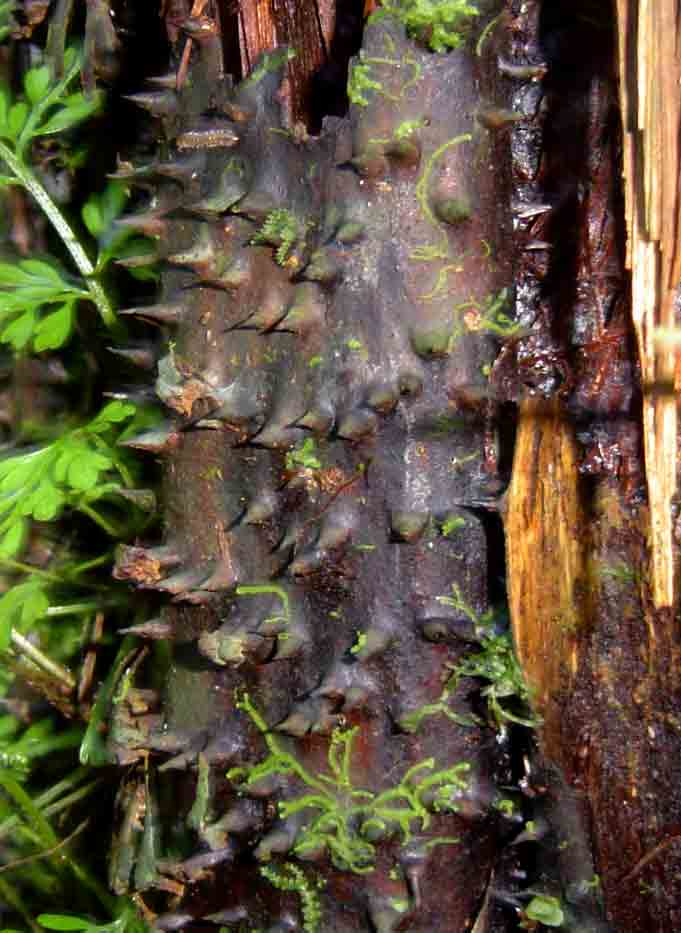
Characteristic spines on the trunk

Alsophila manniana has a slender trunk (10 cm diameter), reaching some 7 m in height, sometimes producing lateral stems which initially function as props or stilts, but later may form new trunks. Fronds are leathery. Stems are protected by spines; aphlebia are absent in the crown of the stem.

Caudex up to 10 cm. in diarn., and up to 6 m. tall, erect, slender, occasionally sending down lateral "prop" stems which are eventually creeping and may form a new upright caudex. Frond arching to horizontal, firmly chartaceous. Stipe c. 30 cm. long, light- to very-dark-purplish-brown, sharply spinose, the spines at the base up to 4 mm. long, and with a thin rufous tomentum when young. Lamina up to 2.4 x 1 m., 3-pinnate, ovate in outline; pinnae up to 52 x 20 cm., oblong, acute, pinnate into very narrowly shortly attenuate pinnate pinnules; pinnule segments very narrowly oblong, somewhat falcate, acute, subentire to crenate-dentate; ventral surface glabrous except for dense stiff curved pale-brown hairs along the costa and costules; dorsal surface often glaucous and with often imbricate lanceolate lacerate brown scales up to 3 mm. long along the costules and costae of the pinnae segments; rhachis light-brown with scattered small prickles, glabrous at maturity. Sori up to 9 per pinnule segment, c. 0.8 mm. in diam.; indusium unequally cupuliform.

— Original Hooker description from 1865

This species was first described by William Hooker in 'Synopsis Filicum' 21 (1865), based on a specimen collected on Fernando Po by Gustav Mann (1836–1916), a German botanist who led expeditions to West Africa and was also a gardener at the Royal Botanic Gardens, Kew, and consequently named after Mann. The prop stems of Hooker, now called stolons, are up to 5 cm (2.0 in) thick and up to 2 m (6 ft 7 in) length. Each mature plant can produce up to 12 ("un dizaine") offshoots, eventually forming a large colony which is locally dominant. Halle found the trunks to be up to 12 m (39 ft) height. A photograph of a dominant colony on Fernando Po (now Bioko) can be seen in "The World's Wonders".

== Distribution and habitat ==
This species is found in deep shade, next to mountain streams in evergreen forest in Sub-Saharan Africa. It is indigenous to Angola, Annobón, Bioko, Burundi, Cameroon, Central African Republic, Congo, Côte d'Ivoire, DRC, Equatorial Guinea, Ethiopia, Gabon, Ghana, Guinea, Kenya, Liberia, Malawi, Mozambique, Nigeria, Rwanda, Sao Tomé, Sierra Leone, Tanzania, Uganda, Zambia, and Zimbabwe.

== Medicinal ==
An infusion of the pith and young leaves is used in traditional medicine for a variety of abdominal and gastric complaints, to ease childbirth and against tapeworms.
