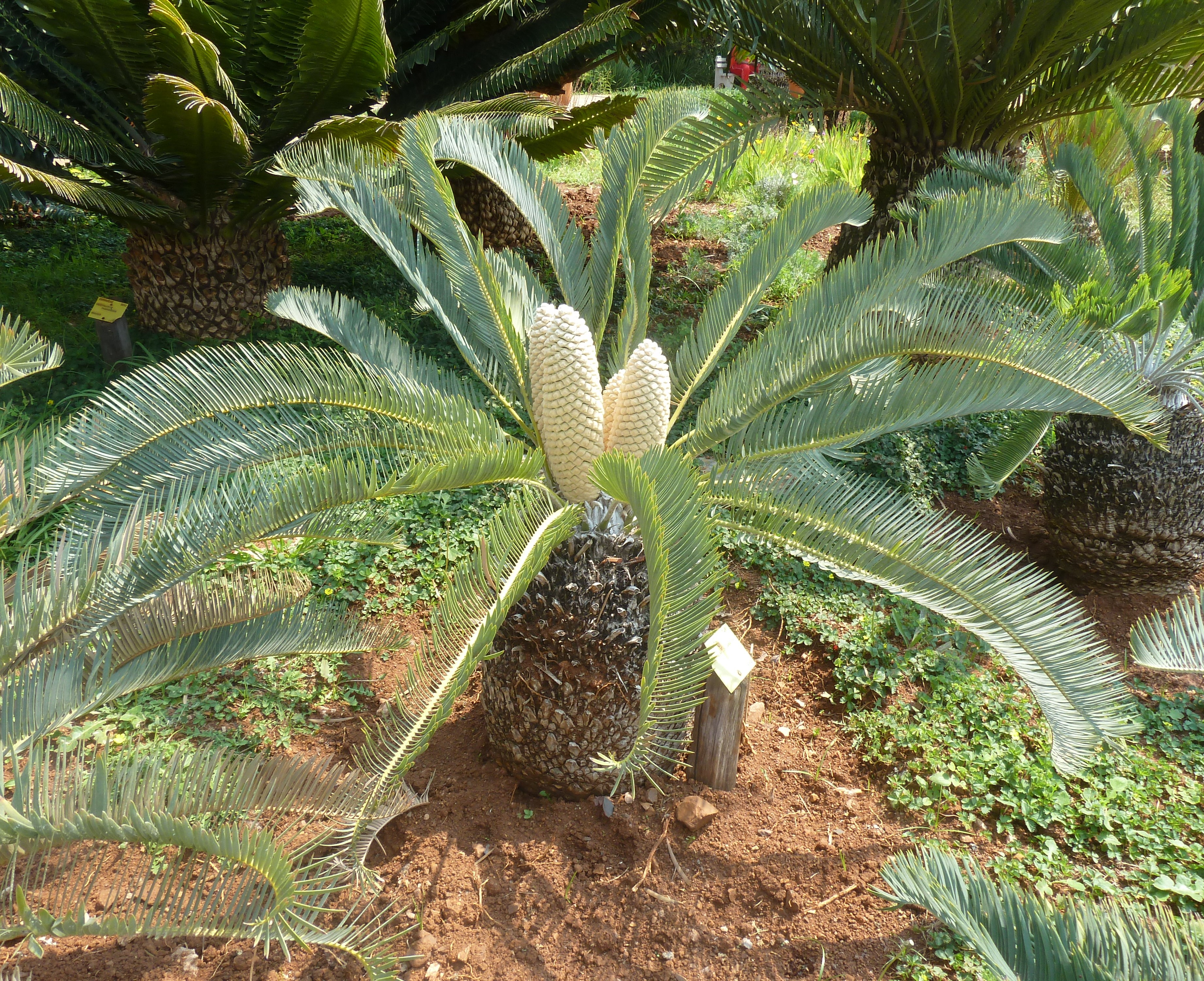
- Olifants river cycad

Conservation status
- Near Threatened (IUCN 3.1)
- CITES Appendix I (CITES)

Scientific classification
- Kingdom: Plantae
- Clade: Tracheophytes
- Clade: Gymnospermae
- Division: Cycadophyta
- Class: Cycadopsida
- Order: Cycadales
- Family: Zamiaceae
- Genus: Encephalartos
- Species: E. lanatus

Binomial name
- Encephalartos lanatus Stapf & Burtt Davy

= Encephalartos lanatus =

Species of plant

Encephalartos lanatus (Olifants River cycad) is a species of cycad, a plant belonging to the family Zamiaceae growing in Mpumalanga, South Africa. Its specific epithet, lanatus, means wooly in Latin.

== Description ==
This plant grows slowly a stem that can reach 1-1.5 meters in height and 25-35 centimeters in diameter. Its leaves are bluish-green, almost silvery, and measure around 100 centimeters in length. They have a thick coating, which gives the plant its specific name. The yellowish spines are straight, with the upper part curved, and the leaflets, which are 10-14 centimeters long, are arranged oppositely along the spine. The margins of the leaflets are smooth, the basal ones being smaller and often reduced to thorns.

Male and female cones are on different plants (dioecious) that are greyish, covered with short hairs, and shaped like ovoids, measuring 25-30 centimeters long and 5-6 centimeters wide. The female cones have a diameter of 12-15 centimeters. The cone is supported by a 2-3 centimeter long peduncle, a plant can produce between one and four cones.

The seeds are oval or oblong, measuring 25-30 millimeters in length, and are covered with a yellow sarcotesta. The plant produces sometimes succers at base.

== Distribution and habitat ==
This species is widespread in a very limited area of the provinces of Mpumalanga and Gauteng, South Africa, at the Wilges and Olifants River catchment area. Its habitat consists of steep rocky slopes covered with prairie, with warm weather in summer and cold in winter when frosts often occur and with an annual precipitation around 700mm. It grows at an altitude of about 1,500 m above mean sea level between rocks, withstands fier and strong frosts (-10°). It is reported to be very difficult to transplant, often dies.

== Conservation ==
The IUCN Red List lists E. lanatus as a near threatened species. Although it is present in a very limited territory, in fact, its population is currently stable. The species is included in Appendix I to the Convention on International Trade in Endangered Species (CITES)

== Bibliography ==
- Whitelock, Loran M. (2002). The Cycads. Timber press. ISBN 0-88192-522-5.
- Haynes J.L (2011). IUCN/SSC Cycad Specialist Group (ed.). "World List of Cycads: A Historical Review" (PDF). Archived from the original (PDF) on 2015-09-23.
