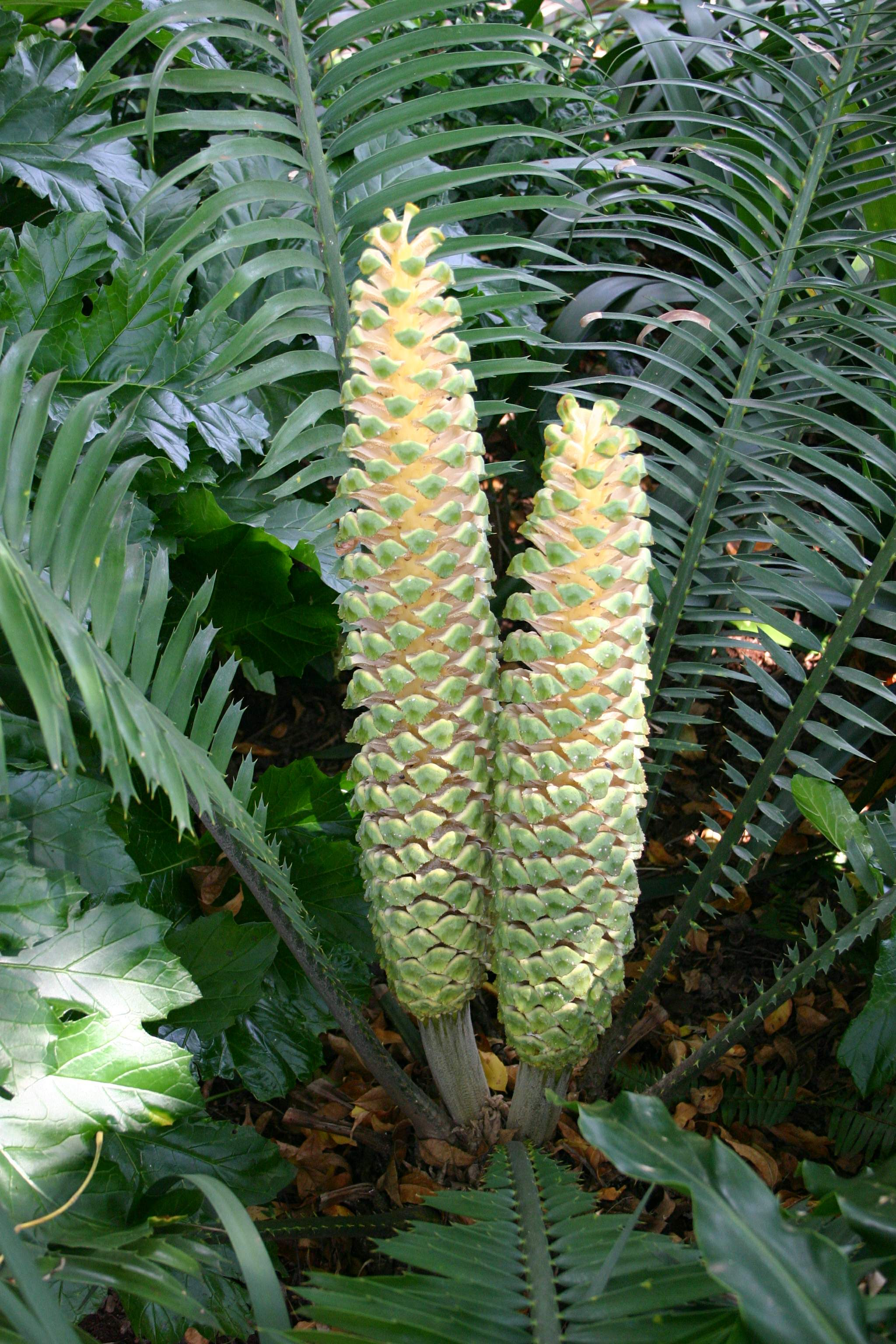
- Plant with male cones

Conservation status
- Least Concern (IUCN 3.1)
- CITES Appendix I (CITES)

Scientific classification
- Kingdom: Plantae
- Clade: Tracheophytes
- Clade: Gymnospermae
- Division: Cycadophyta
- Class: Cycadopsida
- Order: Cycadales
- Family: Zamiaceae
- Genus: Encephalartos
- Species: E. villosus

Binomial name
- Encephalartos villosus Lem.
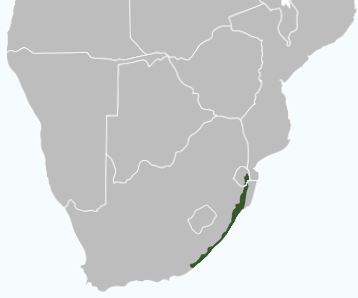
- native range

Synonyms
- Encephalartos striatus

= Encephalartos villosus =

Ground cycad

Species of cycad

Encephalartos villosus is a South African cycad occurring from the East London vicinity, where it is found near the coast, to the northern border of Eswatini (Swaziland) where it may grow as far as 100 km inland. The species is common throughout its range and is the most frequently cultivated in Southern Africa, largely because of its affordable price. As a result of its large geographical distribution, it is notably variable in leaf and cone shape.

== Description ==
A largely underground trunk results in very little of the plant being visible, so that it is described as a dwarf species. The crown normally consists of tightly-packed bracts covered in dense grey woolly hair (villosus = hairy). As with all cycads this species is dioecious. Male plants may carry up to 15 cones, whereas only one or two occur on the females. The seeds, embedded in bright-red flesh are eaten and distributed by the purple-crested lourie (Tauraco porphyreolophus) and by the trumpeter hornbill (Bycanistes bucinator).

== Distribution ==
The preferred habitat of this species is frost-free coastal bush. It hybridises readily with Encephalartos altensteinii in the Eastern Cape and with Encephalartos lebomboensis in the Pongola area.

== Gallery ==
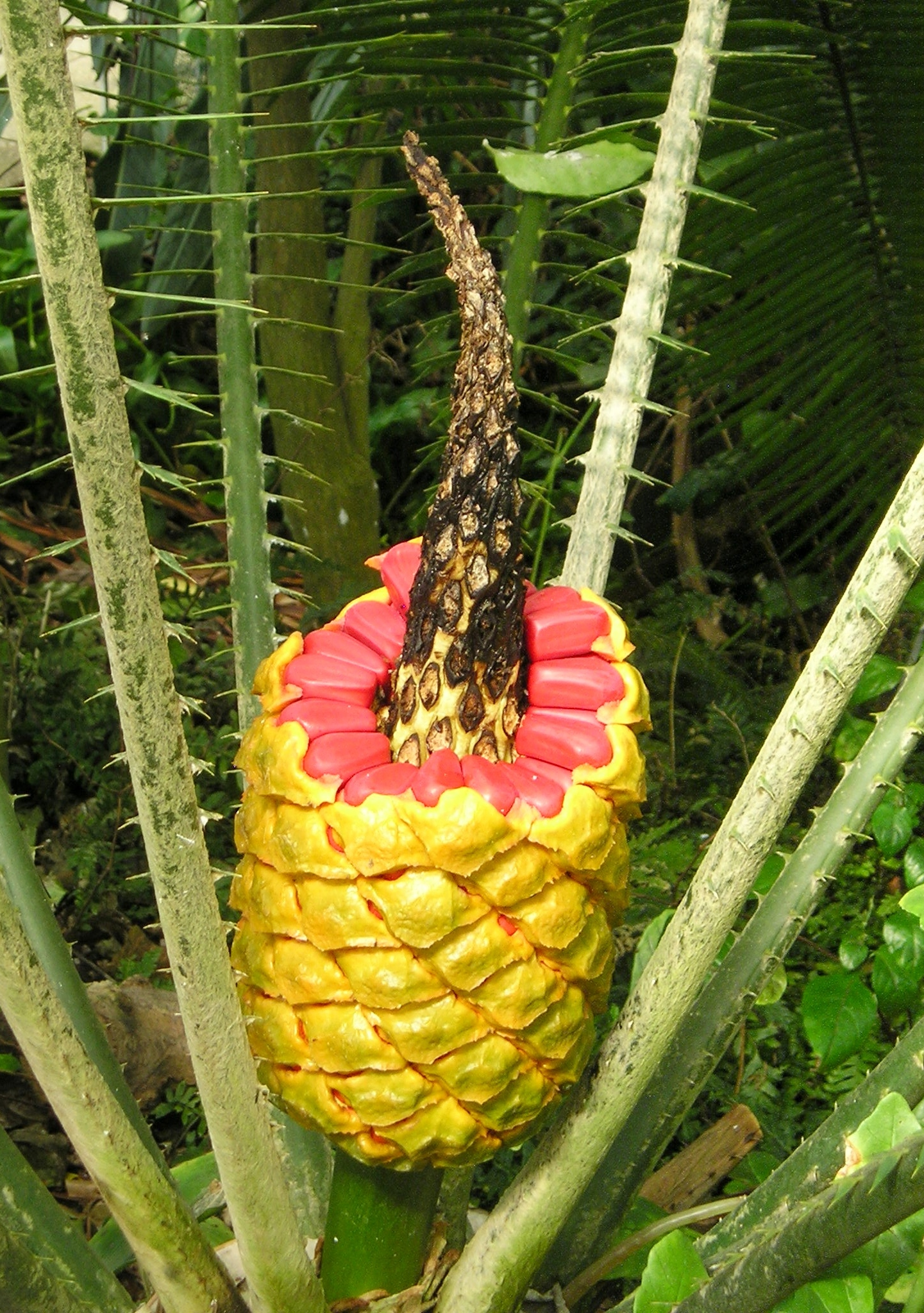
Female cone

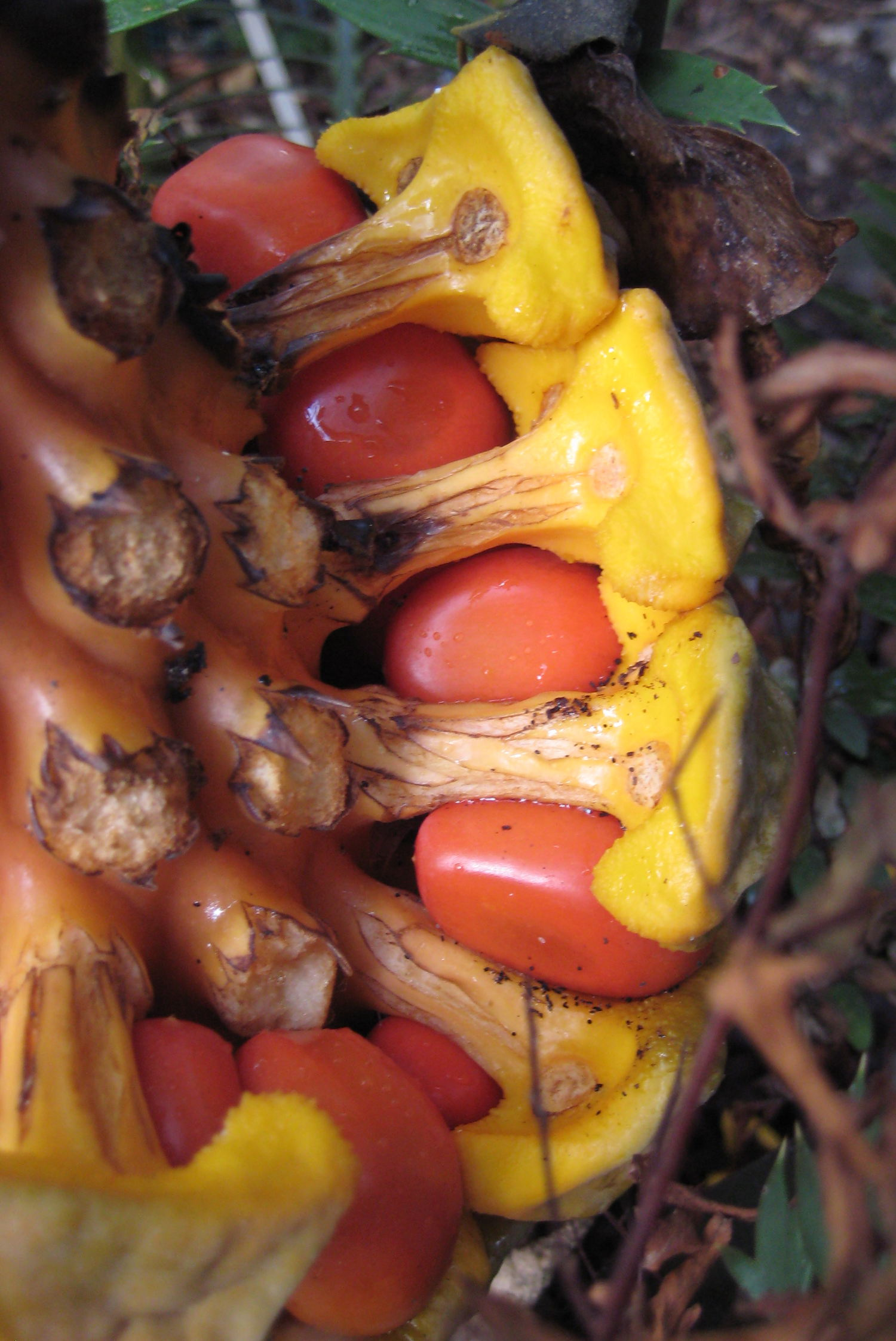
Seeds in female cone
