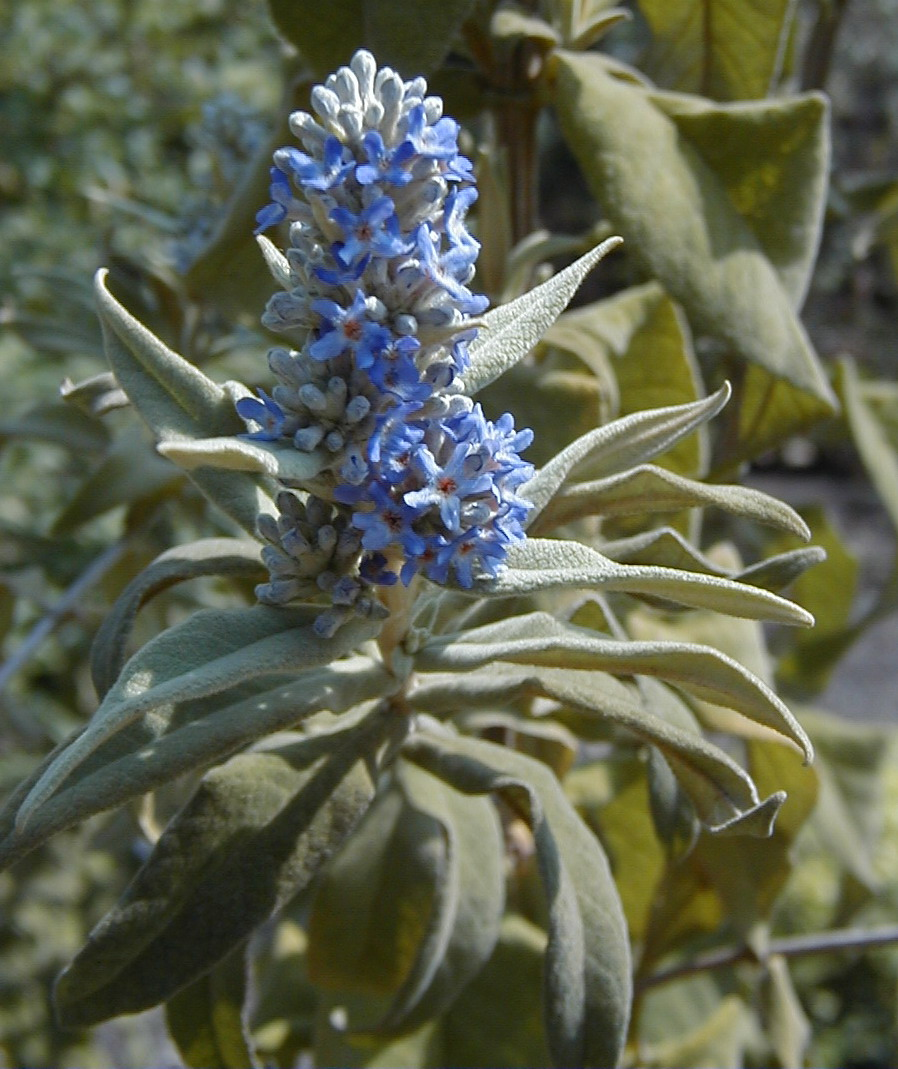
- Buddleja salviifolia inflorescence

Scientific classification
- Kingdom: Plantae
- Clade: Embryophytes
- Clade: Tracheophytes
- Clade: Spermatophytes
- Clade: Angiosperms
- Clade: Eudicots
- Clade: Asterids
- Order: Lamiales
- Family: Scrophulariaceae
- Genus: Buddleja
- Species: B. salviifolia

Binomial name
- Buddleja salviifolia (L.) Lam.

Synonyms
- Buddleja aurantiaco-maculata Gilg; Lantana salviifolia L.

= Buddleja salviifolia =

Species of flowering plant

Buddleja salviifolia, common names sage bush and sagewood, is endemic to much of southern and eastern Africa, from Kenya and Angola south, where it grows on rocky hillsides, along forest margins and watercourses. The species was described and named by Lamarck in 1792.

== Description ==
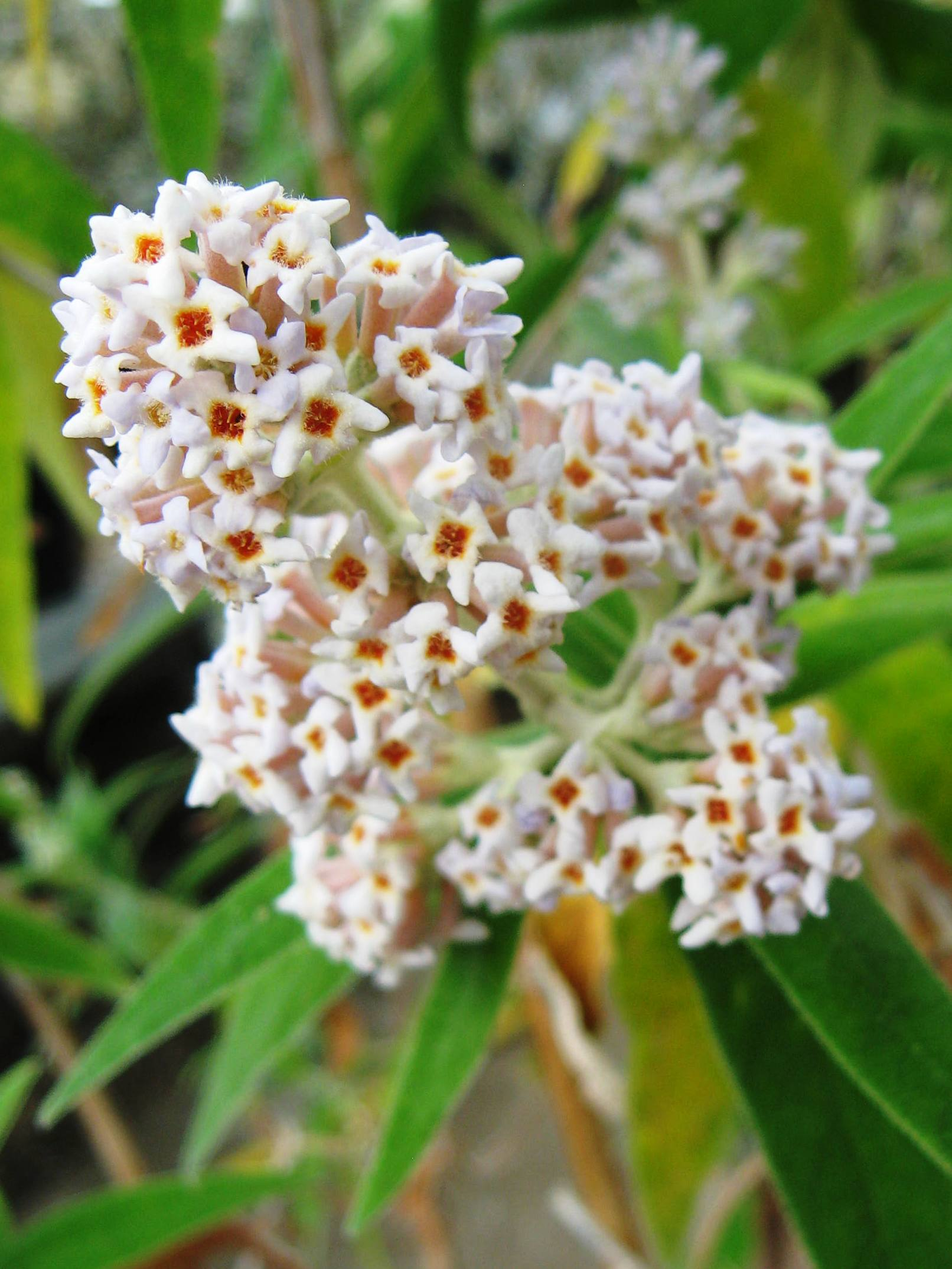
B. salviifolia, white form. Longstock Park Nursery

Buddleja salviifolia is a large, semi-evergreen shrub, multi-stemmed, with untidy, drooping branches, typically reaching a height of 4 – 8 m. The bark is grey-brown and stringy. The shoots are quadrangular in section, and covered with a dense reddish-brown indumentum. The distinctive leaves, with their rugose upper surfaces, bear a resemblance to those of sage, hence the specific epithet. The leaf is sessile to shortly petiolate, the blade narrowly ovate to narrowly oblong, long acuminate to an acute apex, and cordate at the base. The inflorescences are terminal conical panicles approximately 12 × 8 cm, with occasional auxiliary heads appearing in autumn. The flowers range in colour from white, through cream and mauve to purple; the corollas relatively short, at just 4 mm. However, the most striking feature of the flowers is considered to be their scent, judged by some to the best of all the buddlejas, and even bearing comparison with Chanel perfume. Hardiness: USDA zone 8.

== Cultivation ==
The species is relatively common in cultivation; moderately frost hardy and tolerant of dry soils, it is grown in the UK, however its large size and ungainly habit, in the worst buddleja 'bent hatstand' tradition, render it a choice for the larger garden only. Several specimens form part of the NCCPG national collection held by Longstock Park Nursery, near Stockbridge in Hampshire. Occasionally in the UK and France it is mislabelled Buddleja myriantha, a dissimilar Chinese species.

== Uses ==
Decoctions of the plant are believed to have various medicinal benefits in its native lands. The wood, hard and heavy, has traditionally been used for assegais and fishing rods. Otherwise, it is used as fuel, and for hedging.
