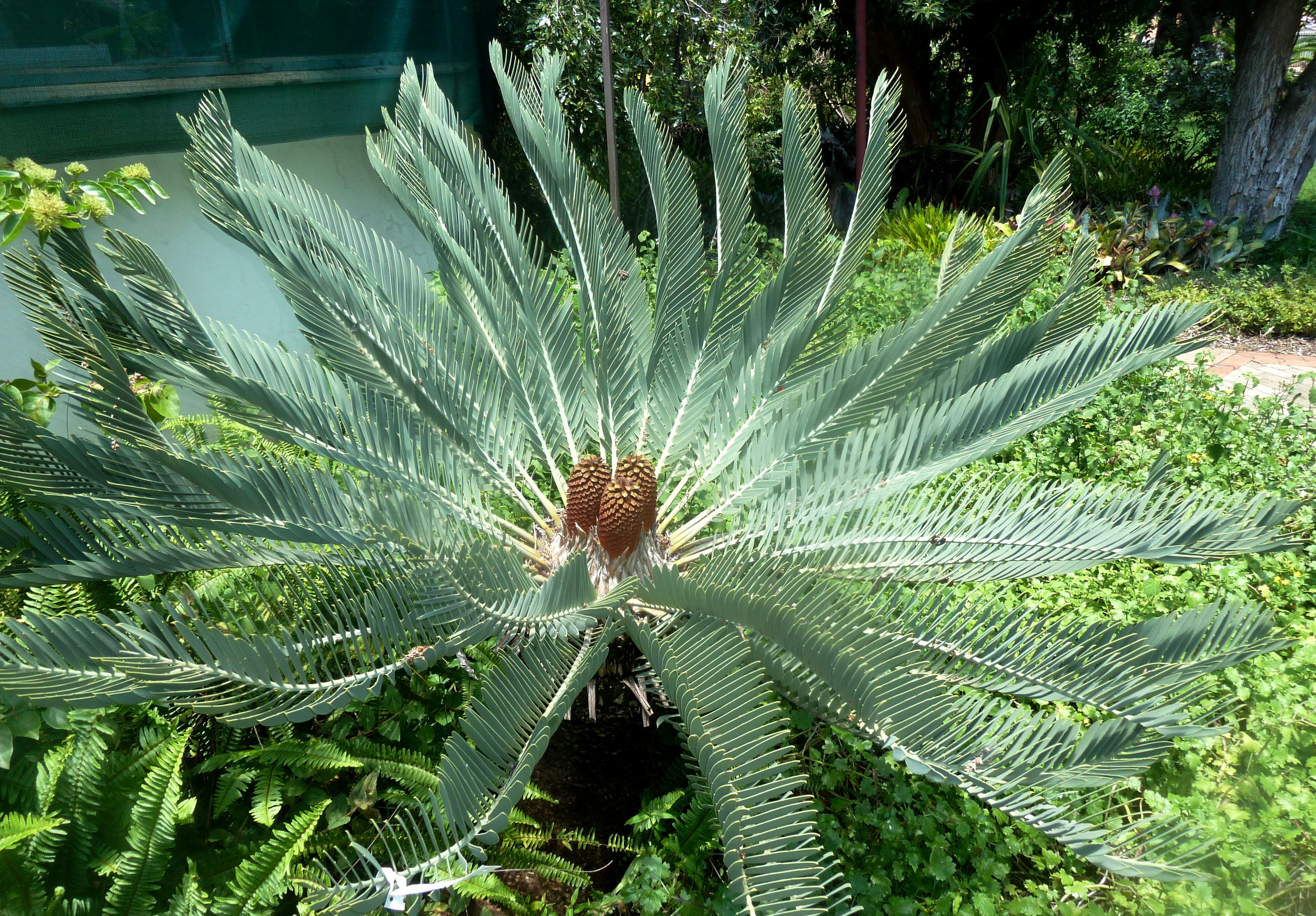

Conservation status
- Endangered (IUCN 3.1)
- CITES Appendix I (CITES)

Scientific classification
- Kingdom: Plantae
- Clade: Tracheophytes
- Clade: Gymnospermae
- Division: Cycadophyta
- Class: Cycadopsida
- Order: Cycadales
- Family: Zamiaceae
- Genus: Encephalartos
- Species: E. eugene-maraisii

Binomial name
- Encephalartos eugene-maraisii I.Verd.

= Encephalartos eugene-maraisii =

Species of plant

Encephalartos eugene-maraisii is a species of cycad in the family Zamiaceae. It is endemic to South Africa, where it is limited to Limpopo. It is known as the Waterberg cycad.

This plant grows in the sandstone hills of the Waterberg Range at 1400 to 1500 meters in elevation. The habitat is grassland and savanna. This endangered species is threatened by overcollection.

This species was named for South African naturalist Eugène Marais.

== Description ==
This cycad is tree-like, with a stem up to 2.5 m tall and 30–45 cm wide. Its leaves are bluish or silvery, 100–150 cm long, and have a strong keel. The leaflets are lanceolate, 15–20 cm long, and arranged oppositely along the rachis at a 45–80° angle. They have smooth margins, although the lower leaflets may have a single spine. This species is dioecious, with brown, spindle-shaped male cones that are 20–40 cm long and 6–8 cm wide. Each plant can produce up to three of these cones. The female cones are ovoid, 30–50 cm long, and 16–20 cm in diameter, with each plant producing up to two at a time. The seeds are oblong, 35–40 mm long, and covered with an orange or brown sarcotesta.

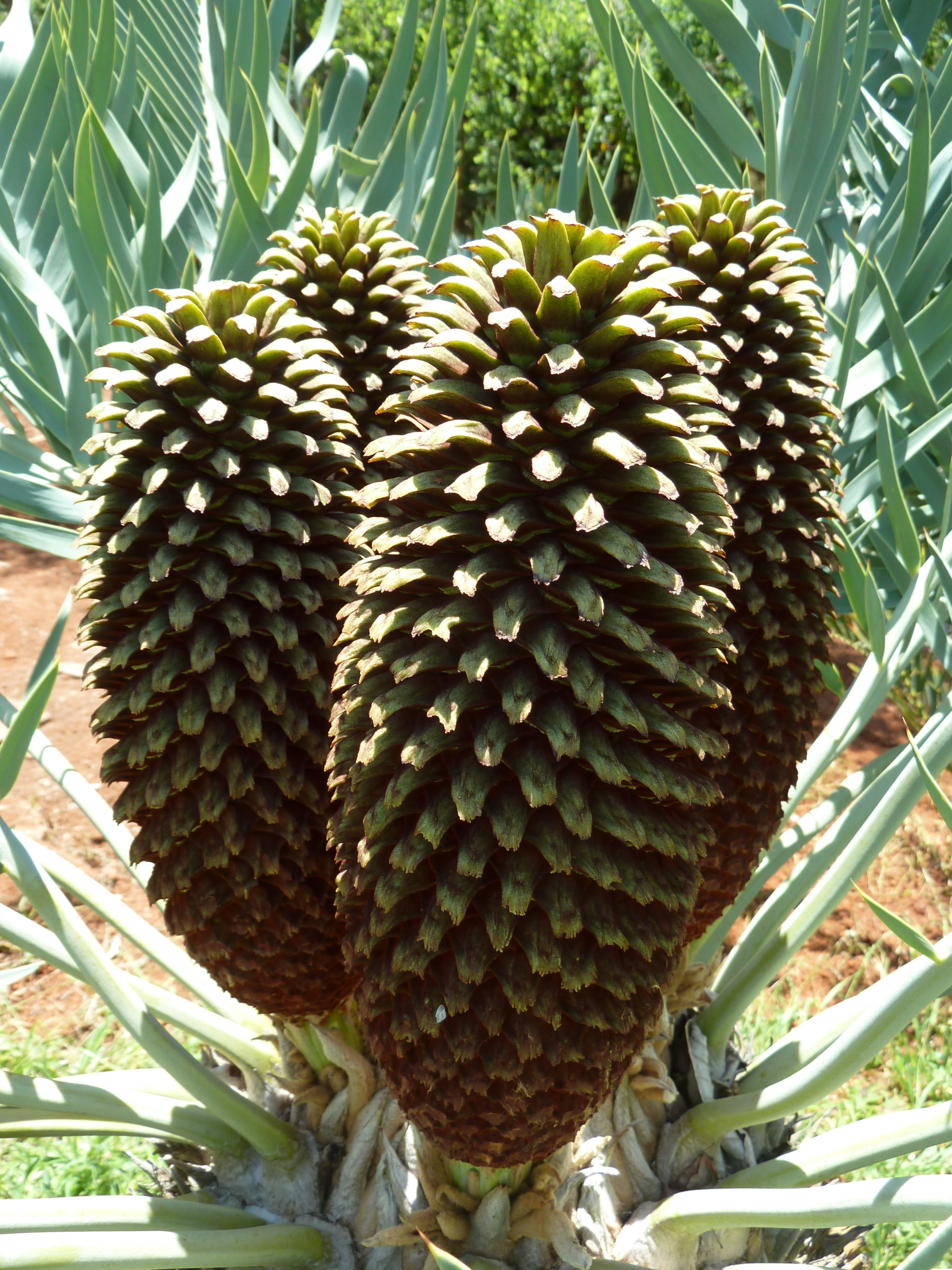
Cone

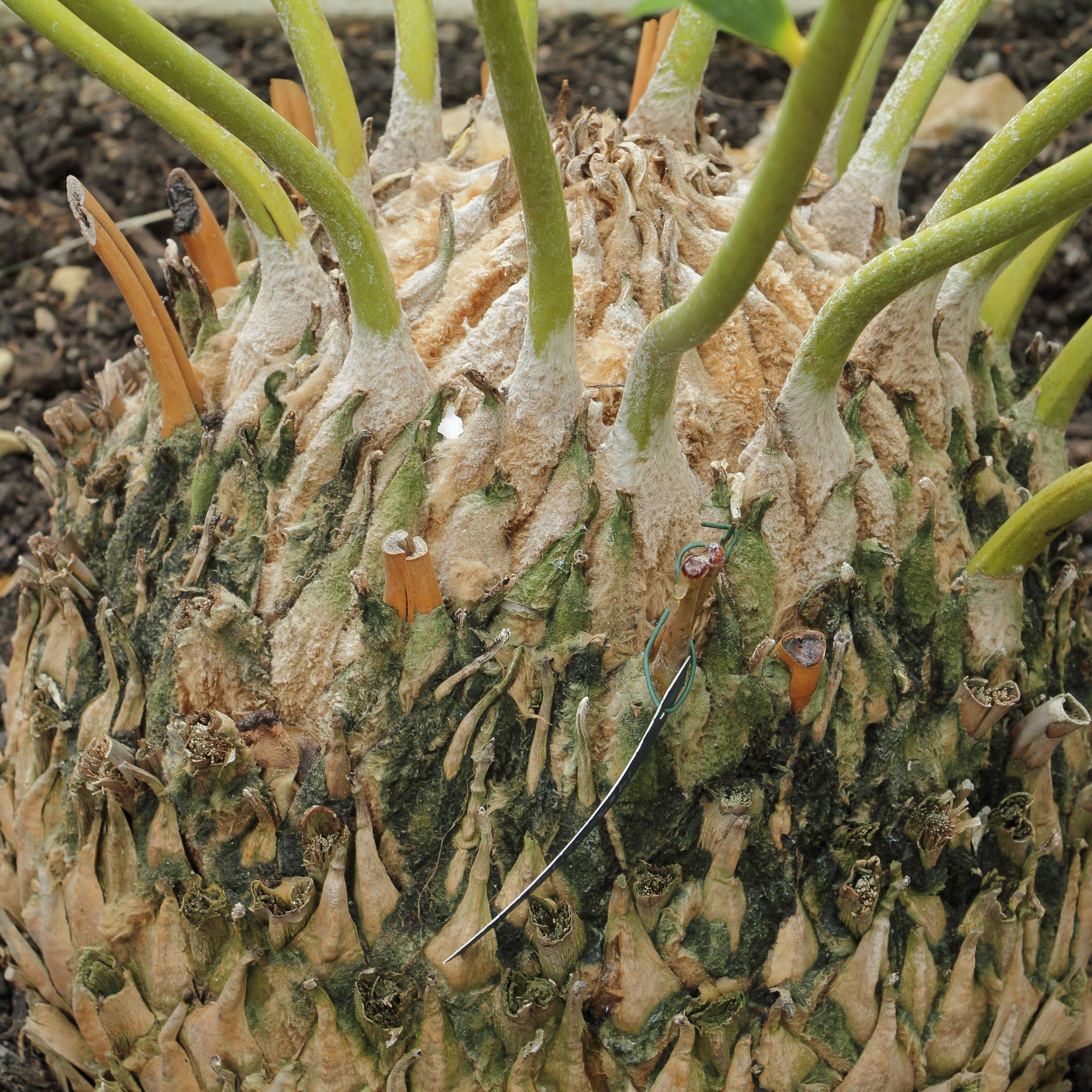
Trunk

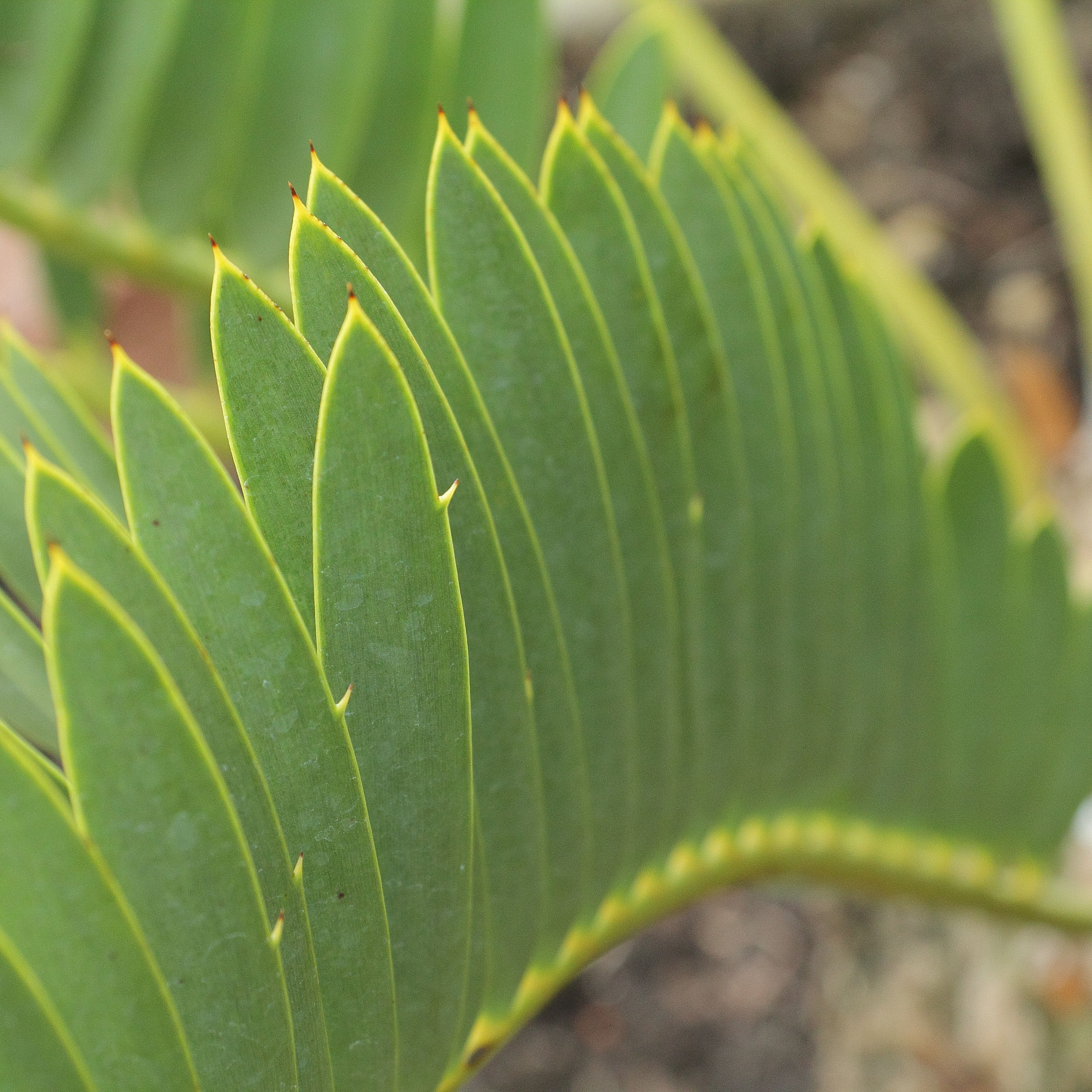
Leaves

== See also ==
- Waterberg Biosphere
