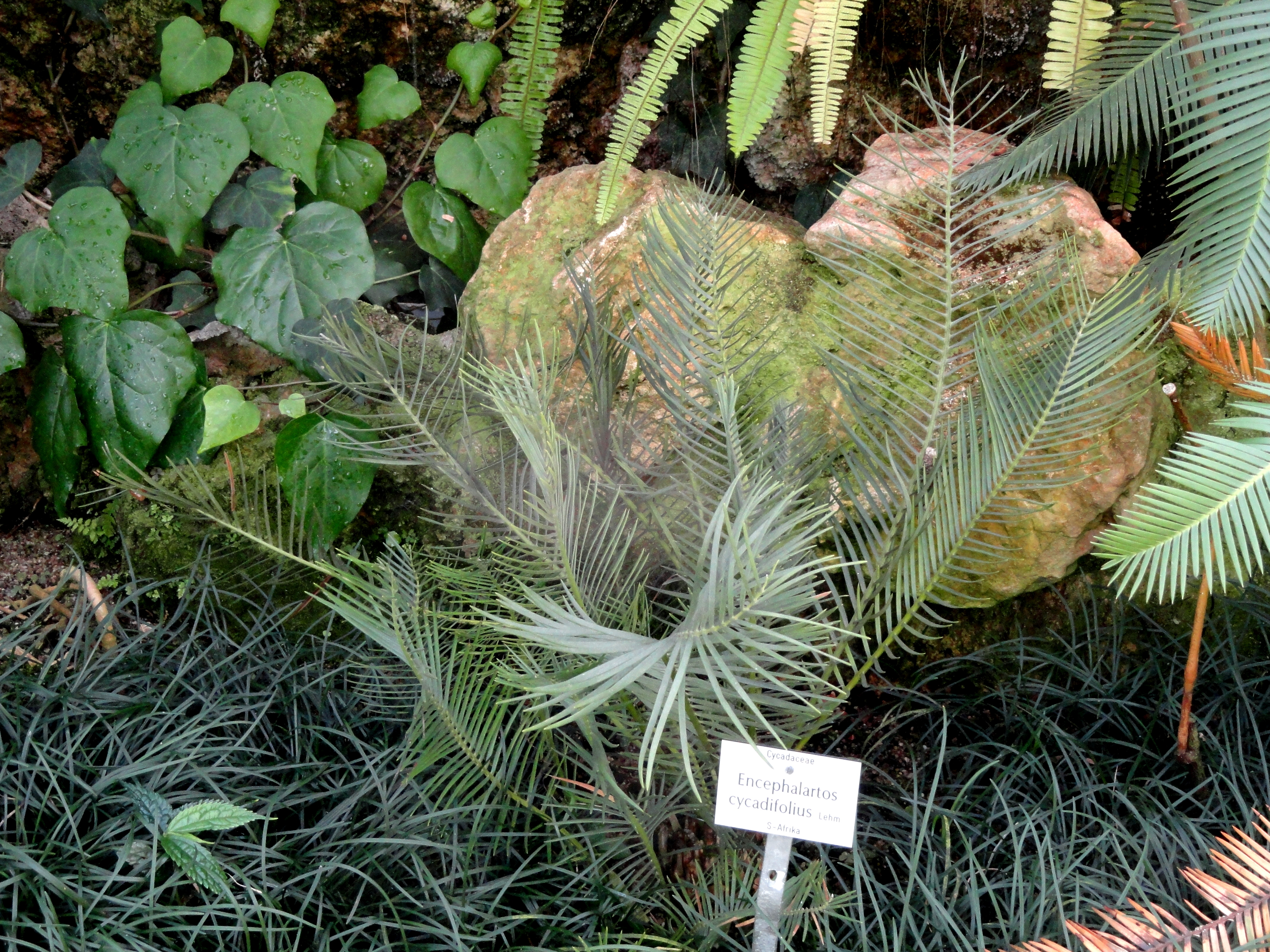

Conservation status
- Least Concern (IUCN 3.1)
- CITES Appendix I (CITES)

Scientific classification
- Kingdom: Plantae
- Clade: Tracheophytes
- Clade: Gymnospermae
- Division: Cycadophyta
- Class: Cycadopsida
- Order: Cycadales
- Family: Zamiaceae
- Genus: Encephalartos
- Species: E. cycadifolius

Binomial name
- Encephalartos cycadifolius (Jacq.) Lehm. 1834

= Encephalartos cycadifolius =

Species of cycad

Encephalartos cycadifolius is a species of cycad that is native to the Winterberg mountains to the north of Bedford in the Eastern Cape province, South Africa. It is found at elevations from 1,200 to 1,800 meters.

== Description ==
This cycad has an underground trunk, reaching up to 1.5 m in height and 25-30 cm in diameter. It often produces secondary stems from shoots at its base. Its pinnate leaves, 60–90 cm long, grow in a crown at the top of the stem, each supported by a 10-20 cm petiole without thorns. The leaves consist of numerous pairs of lanceolate leaflets, about 9-12 cm long, with an entire margin, and are olive-green in color. This species is dioecious, with male specimens bearing 1 or 2 cylindrical-conical cones, 13–22 cm long and 5–7 cm broad, covered in a greyish tomentum. Female specimens have 1 or 2 cylindrical-ovoid cones, pedunculate, 20–30 cm long and 16–18 cm in diameter, greenish-yellow and thickly tomentose. The seeds are roughly ovoid, 20–30 mm long, and covered by a yellow-orange to amber sarcotesta.
