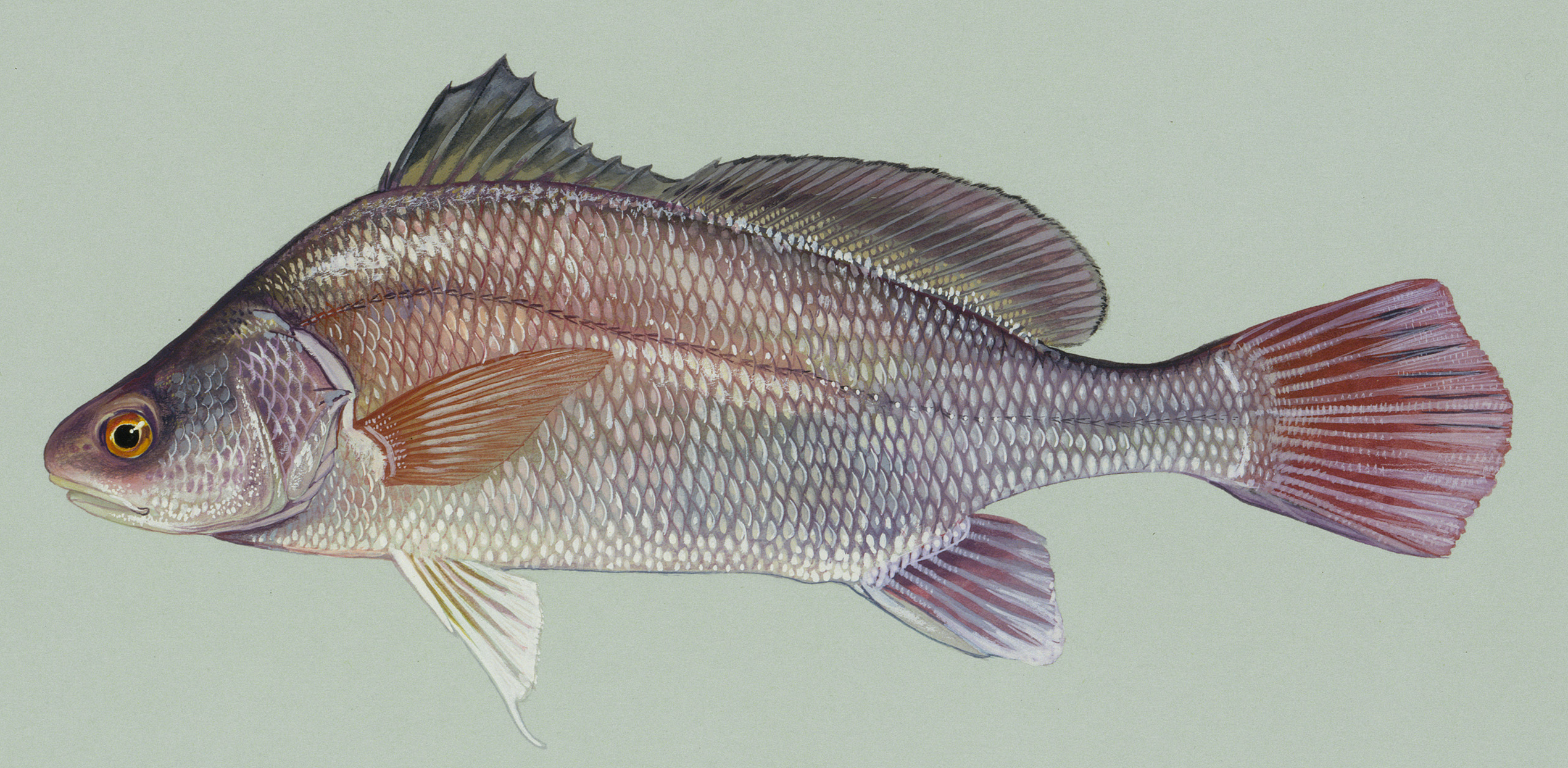

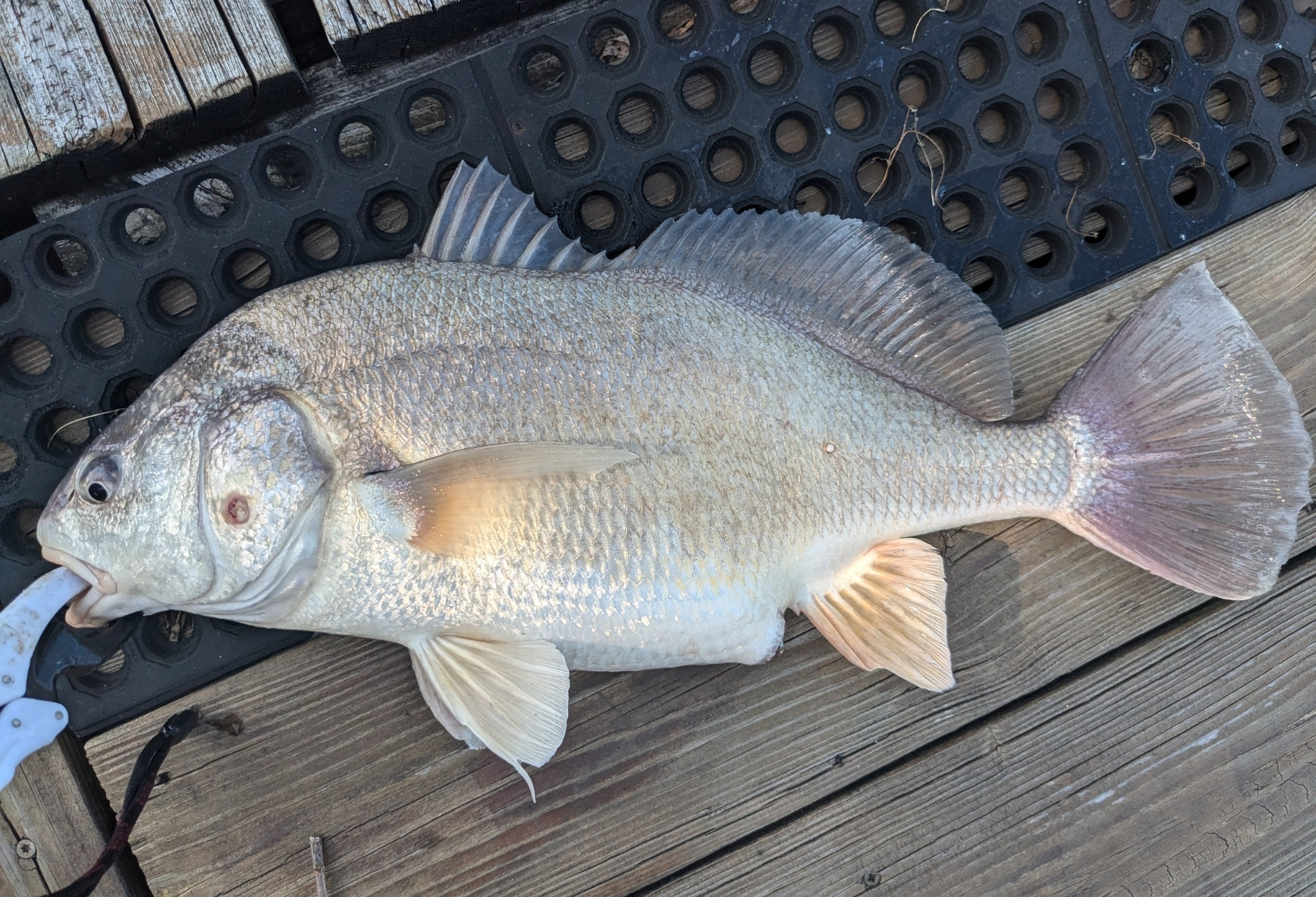

Conservation status
- Least Concern (IUCN 3.1)

Scientific classification
- Kingdom: Animalia
- Phylum: Chordata
- Class: Actinopterygii
- Order: Acanthuriformes
- Family: Sciaenidae
- Genus: Aplodinotus; Rafinesque, 1819
- Species: A. grunniens

Binomial name
- Aplodinotus grunniens Rafinesque, 1819

Synonyms
- Sciaena oscula Lesueur, 1822; Sciaena grisea Lesueur, 1822; Corvina richardsonii Cuvier, 1830

= Freshwater drum =

Species of fish

The freshwater drum, Aplodinotus grunniens, is a fish endemic to North and Central America. It is the only species in the genus Aplodinotus, and is a member of the family Sciaenidae. It is the only North American member of the group that inhabits freshwater for its entire life. Its generic name, Aplodinotus, comes from Greek meaning "single back", and the specific epithet, grunniens, comes from a Latin word meaning "grunting". It is given to it because of the grunting noise that mature males make. This noise comes from a special set of muscles within the body cavity that vibrate against the swim bladder. The purpose of the grunting is unknown, but due to it being present in only mature males and during the spawning season, it is assumed to be linked to spawning.

The freshwater drum is also called Russell fish, shepherd's pie, gray bass, Gasper goo, Gaspergou, gou, grunt, grunter, grinder, gooble gobble, and croaker. It is commonly known as sheephead and sunfish in parts of Canada, and the United States.

== Distribution ==
Freshwater drum are the only North American member of their family to exclusively inhabit freshwater (freshwater family members in genera Pachypops, Pachyurus, Petilipinnis and Plagioscion are from South America, while Boesemania is Asian). Their great distribution range goes as far north as the Hudson Bay, and reaches as far south as Guatemala. Their longitudinal distribution goes as far east as the eastern Appalachians and stretches as far west into Texas, Kansas, and Oklahoma. Freshwater drum are considered to be one of the most wide-ranging species in North America.

== Description ==
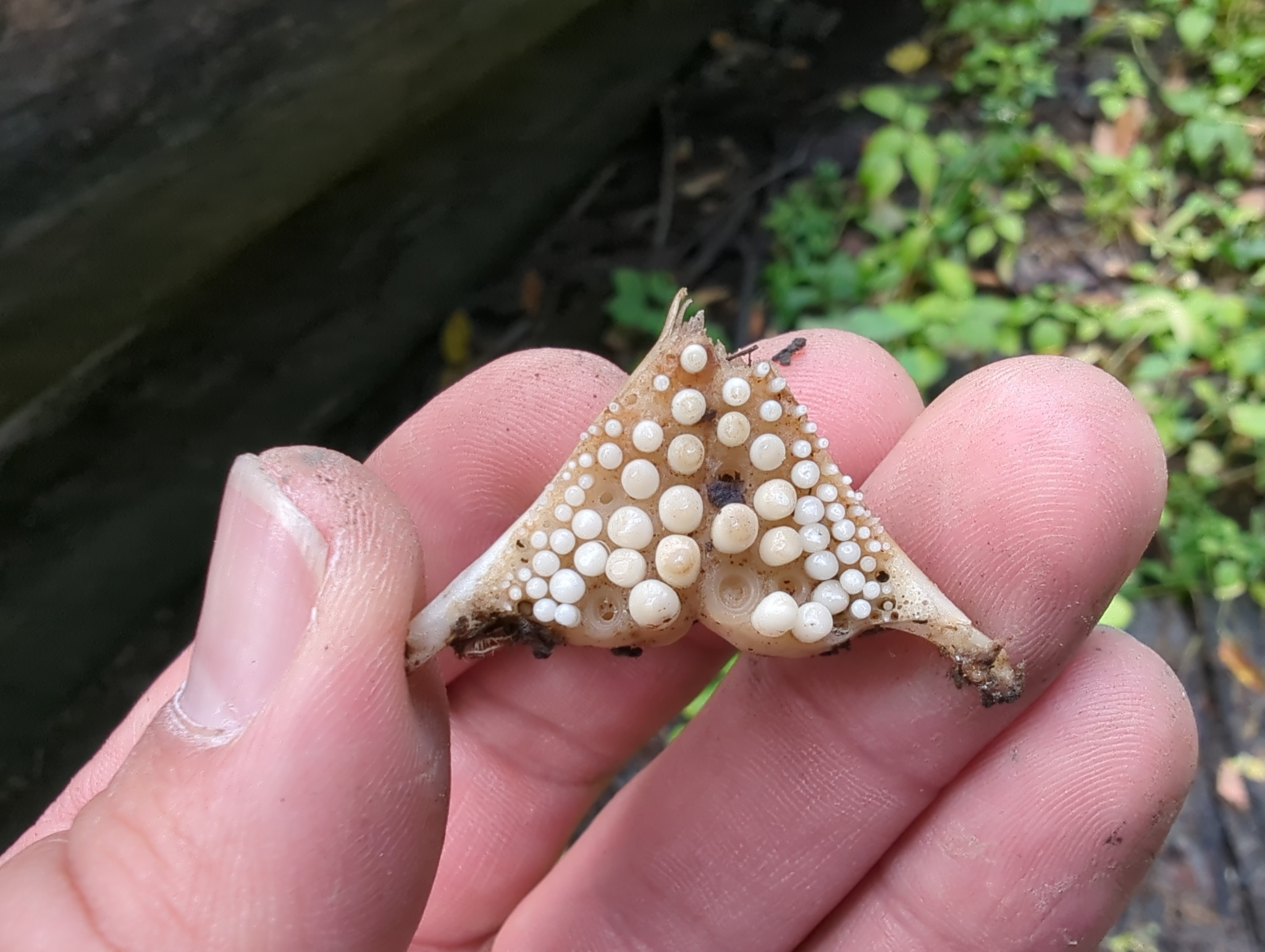
Lower pharyngeal tooth plate

The drum typically weighs 5–15 lb (2.3–6.8 kg). The world record was caught on Nickajack Lake in Tennessee, and weighed in at 54 lb 8 oz (24.7 kg). The freshwater drum is frequently gray or silvery but may be more bronze or brown colored, common in the Lake Erie population. It is a deep-bodied fish with a divided dorsal fin consisting of 10 spines and approximately 30 rays. The pectoral fins are elongated and pointed, and the lateral line extends into the caudal fin, which has a rounded or pointed margin.

The eye of the freshwater drum contains a tapetum lucidum within the retinal pigmented epithelium, as in other sciaenids. In other sciaenids this structure has been found to contain packed lipid spherules which contribute to its reflective properties.

Extensive pharyngeal tooth pads are present in upper and lower sets, with cardiform and villiform teeth gradually being replaced by molariform teeth as the fish grows larger.

== Ecology ==
The freshwater drum prefers clear water, but it is tolerant of turbid and murky water. They prefer the bottom to be clean sand and gravel substrates.

The diet of the freshwater drum is generally benthic and composed of macroinvertebrates (mainly aquatic insect larvae and bivalve mussels), as well as small fish in certain ecosystems. Freshwater drum show distinct seasonal differences in their diet. In April and May, the drum feeds on dipterans. During these months, dipterans make up about 50 percent of the freshwater drum's diet. In August through November, they tend to eat fish (which are primarily young-of-the-year Gizzard shad). The percentage of fish in their diet at this time ranges from 52 to 94 percent. Other items in the drum's diet are mollusks and crayfish.

The freshwater drum competes with several organisms. During its early stages in Lake Erie, it has been shown to compete with yellow perch, the trout-perch, and the emerald shiner. During its adult lifetime, it competes with yellow perch and silver chub in deep water, and competes with black bass in the shoal areas.

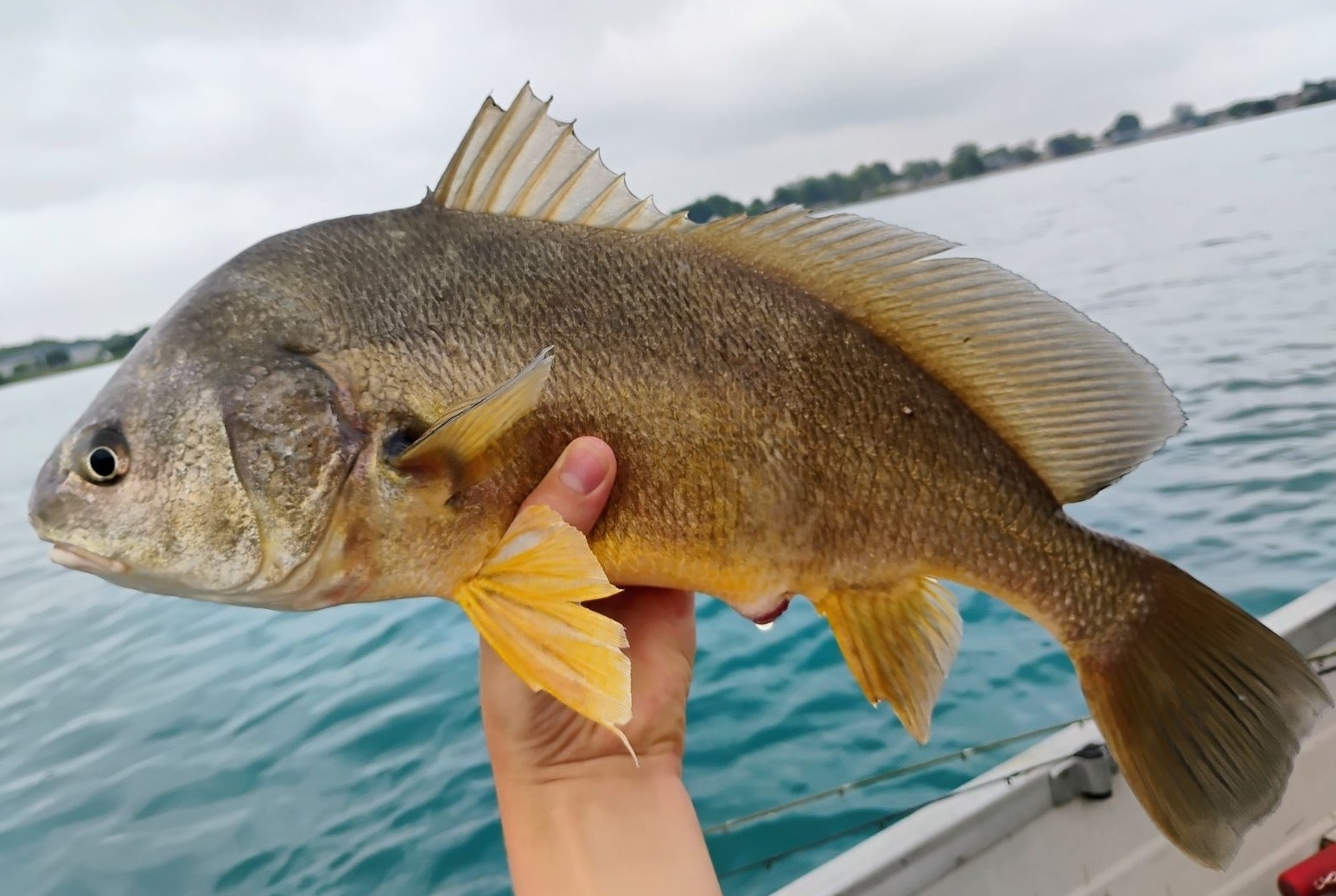
In Michigan

Predators on drum include humans and other fish. During its first year, the freshwater drum serves as a forage fish for many species of predatory fish. These include smallmouth bass, walleye, and many other piscivores. After its first year, the primary predators on freshwater drum are humans. The drum is an important commercial crop on the Mississippi River, but in other areas it constitutes only a small portion of the commercial catch. Consistent with other sciaenids, freshwater drum are strongly nocturnal with the bulk of most catches being derived from night angling/sampling. Commercial fisheries are present for this species, although market price tends to be quite low. Thus, many freshwater drum are harvested as bycatch from targeted higher-value species.

There has been some research on the freshwater drum's impact on the invasive zebra mussel in northern lakes and rivers. Zebra mussels are consumed by freshwater drum once they reach a length of 25 cm (9.8 in), but drum under 35 cm (14 in) in length only eat small mussels and reject the larger ones. The fish larger than 35 cm (14 in) exhibit less selectivity and consume mussels relative to their availability in lakes. These larger fish are not restricted by their ability to crush zebra mussels, but they are restricted by the size of the clumps that they can remove. The drums' eating of zebra mussels contributes to a high mussel mortality, but not enough to have an impact on their spread, or control the population.

== Life history ==
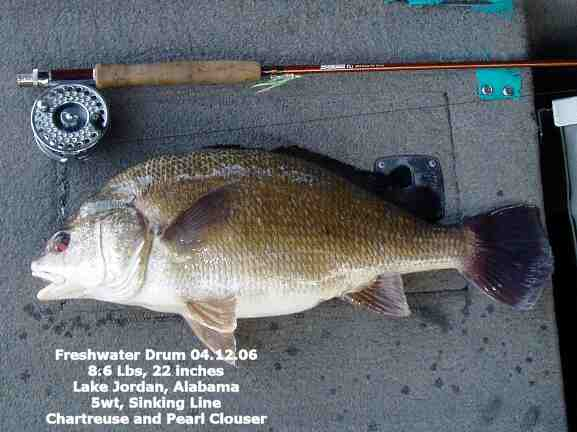
At, Lake Jordan, Alabama

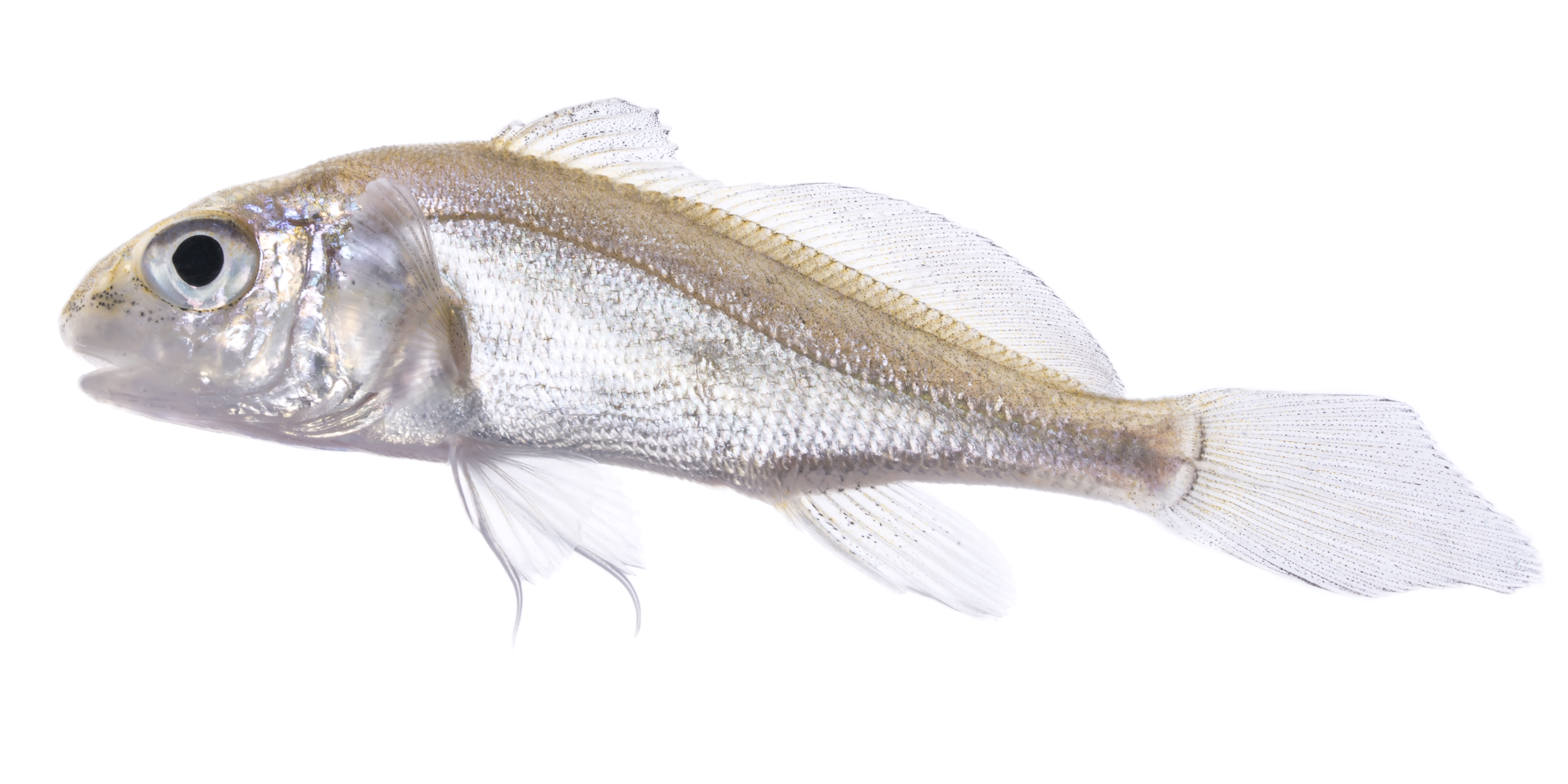
Young juvenile

During the summer, freshwater drums move into warm, shallow water that is less than 33 ft (10 m) deep. The freshwater drum then spawn during a six to seven-week period from June through July when the water reaches a temperature of about 65 °F (18 °C). During the spawn, females release their eggs into the water column and males release their sperm. Fertilization is random. Males generally reach sexual maturity at four years, whereas females reach maturity at five or six years. Females from six to nine years old have a clutch size of 34,000 to 66,500 eggs and they spawn in open water giving no parental care to their larvae. The eggs then float to the top of the water column and hatch between two and four days. Due to the broadcasting of eggs in open water and lack of parental care, many eggs and larvae fall victim to predation upon hatching, the pro-larvae average 3.2 mm (1/8 in) long. The post-larval stage begins about 45 hours after hatching and a length of 4.4 mm (3/16 in) is attained.

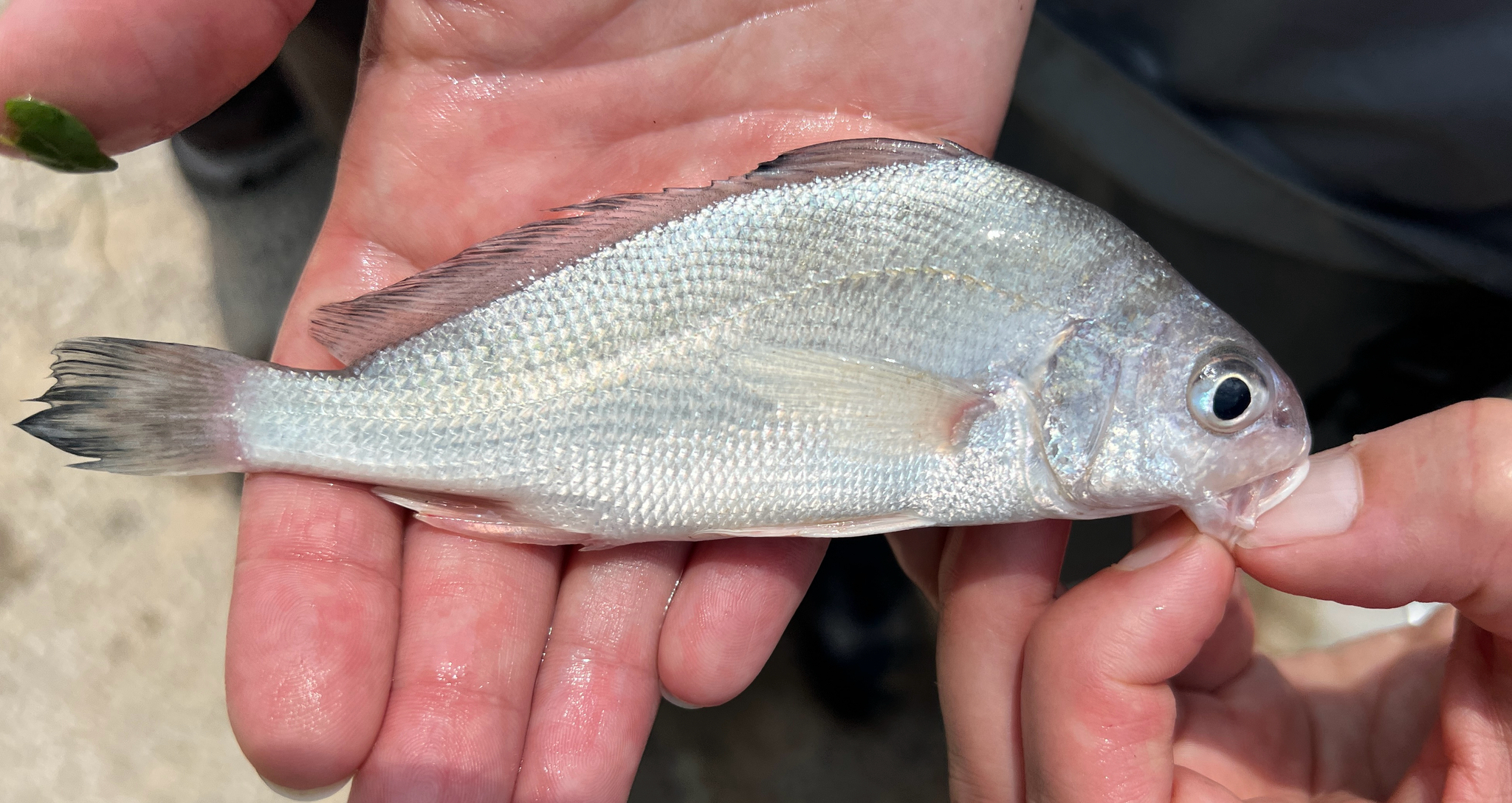
Juvenile

Females grow at a faster rate than the males and adult characteristics start to form at a length of 15 mm (1 in). Females continue to outgrow the male throughout their lives reaching a length of 12 to 30 in (30 to 76 cm). Usually the freshwater drum weighs 2–10 lb (0.91–4.54 kg), but they can reach well over 36 lb (16 kg). Freshwater drums are long-lived and have attained maximum ages of 72 years old in Red Lakes, Minnesota and 32 years old in the Cahaba River, Alabama. Though they can reach very old age, the average age of a freshwater drum is between 6 and 13 years. In some cases, otoliths provide such a long record of growth that they can be studied using the same techniques as those used by dendrochronologists.

== Current management ==
There are few management practices for the species, and in many regions daily bag limits are unlimited. The freshwater drum is not federally or state listed by any states. Although the commercial harvest is up to 1 million pounds per year, they are in no danger of overharvest. In the Mississippi River alone, the commercial catch has reached about 300,000 lb (136,078 kg) in recent years. Due to its abundance, many states allow bowfishing and other non-conventional means to harvest the fish.

== See also ==
- Lucky stone
