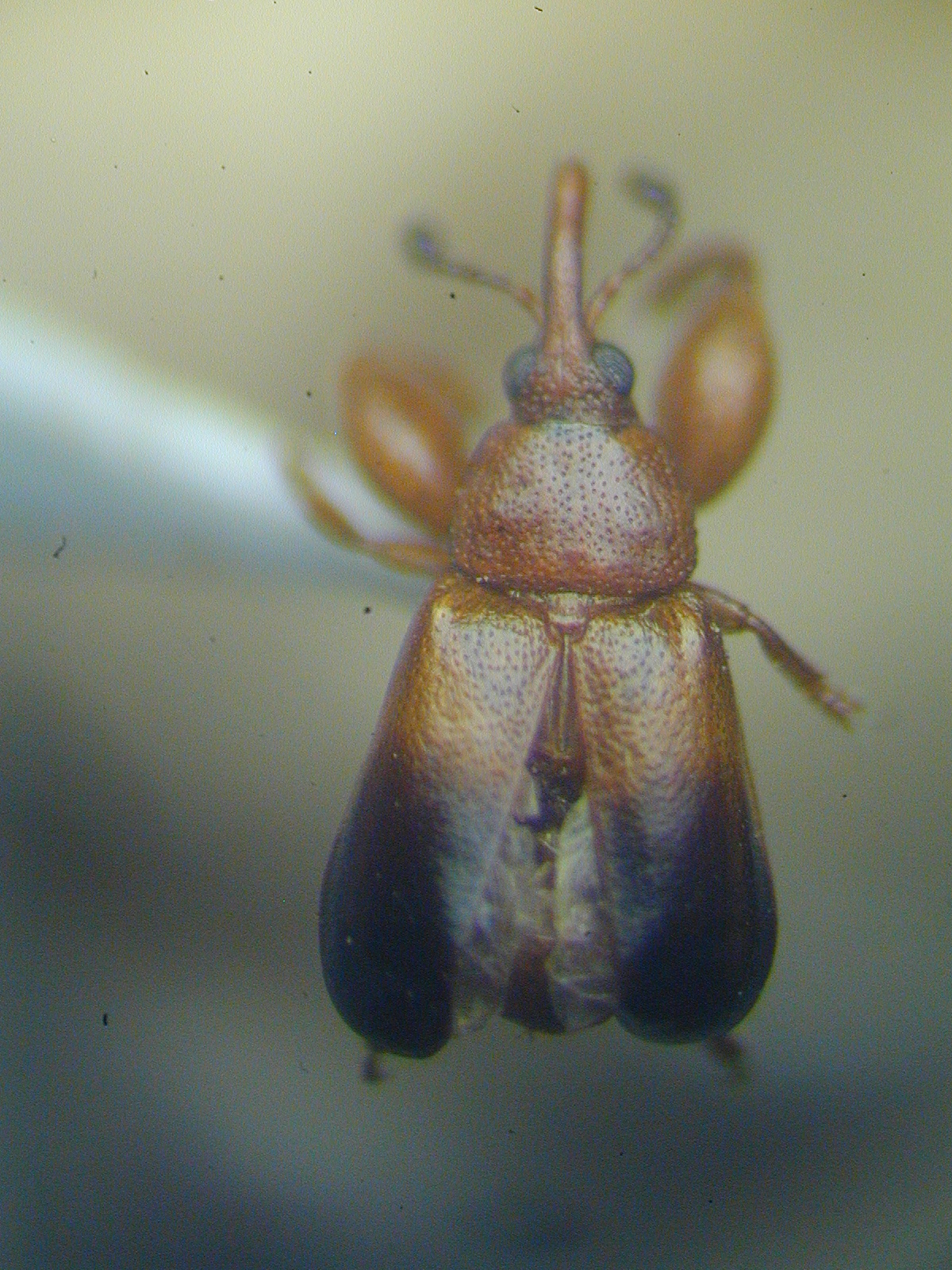
- Male Rhopalotria dimidiata Note the wide pronotum (typical for many Oxycorynini) and the round elytra tips.

Scientific classification
- Kingdom: Animalia
- Phylum: Arthropoda
- Clade: Pancrustacea
- Class: Insecta
- Order: Coleoptera
- Suborder: Polyphaga
- Infraorder: Cucujiformia
- Family: Belidae
- Subfamily: Oxycoryninae
- Tribe: Oxycorynini; Schönherr, 1840

Genera
- Alloxycorynus; Balanophorobius; Hydnorobius; Oxycorynus; Oxycraspedus; Parallocorynus; Rhopalotria

Synonyms
- Oxychoridae Ienistea, 1986 (lapsus); Oxycorhyninae Voss, 1943 (lapsus); Oxycorynidae Kolbe, 1908; Oxycorynides Schönherr, 1840; Oxycoryninae Pascoe, 1870

= Oxycorynini =

Tribe of beetles

Oxycorynini are a tribe of American belids, primitive weevils of the family Belidae. Like in other belids, their antennae are straight, not elbowed as in the true weevils (Curculionidae). In contrast to other Belidae, Oxycorynini larvae feed on flowers or several types of fruit.

The Oxycorynini contain 7 genera, the bulk of the subfamily Oxycoryninae. But while they are highly diverse, they are not particularly speciose, with nearly 20 described and a few undescribed species compared to the more than 150 Hawaiian species of Proterhinus of the Aglycyderini.

The fossil record shows that the three Oxycoryninae tribes were well distinct by the mid-Paleogene, about 50 million years ago (mya). The belids as a whole are of Jurassic origin, and the Oxycorynini must thus have evolved in the Late Cretaceous or perhaps Paleocene, roughly some 100-60 mya.

== Description ==
The adult Oxycorynini have a number of fairly characteristic traits, but they are not present in all members of this tribe. Many have a pronotum whose hind margin is at least as wide as the elytra bases, often wider. Except in the rather primitive Oxycraspedus, the first tarsomere is smaller than the second, and microscopically the lack of spermatheca, with the spermathecal duct directly inserting on the common oviduct, is conspicuous.

Adults of Parallocorynus and Rhopalotria are peculiarly soft-bodied and possess several characteristic traits: their gular sutures are fused to a single suture, their elytra cannot be locked in open position and have round tips between which the pygidium can be seen. The sternite of their mesothorax slants forward, but the part protruding between the second leg pair is not raised. Finally, their spermathecal gland and spermathecal duct form a common tube. Alloxycorynus and Hydnorobius adults have two gular sutures which form a semicircle at the head base and end in distinct tips; their elytra are ribbed lengthwise. Adults of Balanophorobius and Oxycorynus have a flattened hindside of the metathoracal sternite.

More characteristic are the larvae. Their labrum has two sensilla at the base and two more towards the center of the forward maring. They have a typical body shape with recurved hindparts; the anus opens on the underside. Except in Oxycraspedus, the dark forehead is bordered by a ridge towards the back, where the cuticle attaches, and the body is widest in the middle of the abdomen. And of course, Oxycorynini larvae differ from other belids in that their larvae do not feed on dead or decaying wood but on flowers and fruits.

== Systematics ==
The Oxycorynini are tentatively divided into 3 subtribes:

Oxycraspedina

- Oxycraspedus

Allocorynina

- Parallocorynus
- Rhopalotria

Oxycorynina

- Hydnorobius
- Alloxycorynus
- Oxycorynus
- Balanophorobius

However, most of this subdivision, in particular the monophyly of the Oxycorynina, is by no means reliably established. Oxycraspedus seems to be simply a very basal genus. What seems probable is that Parallocorynus and Rhopalotria as well as Balanophorobius and Oxycorynus are sister genera, with the other genera are of rather uncertain position in regard to these two clades. But while the Allocorynina are quite surely a good clade, the biogeography of the Oxycorynina is puzzling, because Balanophorobius does not occur anywhere near its presumed sister taxon Oxycorynus, which instead ranges adjacent to the other two members of the proposed subtribe. Neither are all species of Oxycorynini discovered yet, nor is the knowledge about their distribution considered satisfactory by entomologists.

== Distribution ==
Oxycraspedus, apparently the most ancient living genus of Oxycorynini, has three described species limited to Chile between the Maule and Araucanía Regions and adjacent Argentina where they have been found in Neuquén Province.

Parallocorynus with one and Rhopalotria with three described species - several undescribed species are known in each genus - occur across Central America and in some adjacent regions. The former only occurs in Mexico and Honduras, while the latter is widespread from Mexico to Panama, also occurring on Cuba and in Florida, and probably in northern South America too.

The two Alloxycorynus species are found from southern Peru (Cusco Region) to eastern Bolivia and northern Argentina. Hydnorobius with three species occurs to the southeast of Alloxycorynus south to central Argentina (Mendoza to Buenos Aires Provinces). Oxycorynus occurs with 5 known species northwards of Hydnorobius, from northern Argentina and southern Bolivia north into Brazil (Santa Catarina state). The monotypic Balanophorobius, described only in 2005, has not yet been found outside the Osa Peninsula of Costa Rica.

== Ecology ==
Oxycraspedus utilizes the cones of the Monkey-puzzle tree (Araucaria araucana). Adults seek shelter in the cones - usually female one but occasionally male ones too - and larvae feed on the parenchymatous tissue but not the seeds. Indeed, by the time the larvae have finished their development to pupation, the host cones are typically already discarded by the plant and have shed their seeds. Very old cones that are slowly rotting on the forest floor are also taken, demonstrating the evolutionary link between Oxycorynini and the other Belidae which also feed on decaying woody tissue, but of twigs and stems.

Parallocorynus has to date only been collected from the cycad genus Dioon. Similarly Rhopalotria is associated with various species of Zamia cycads, though one of the as yet undescribed species was collected from Dioon spinulosum. It seems that the species of Rhopalotria are monophagous - like R. slossoni on Coontie (Z. pumila) or R. mollis on Cardboard Cycad (Z. furfuracea) - but more research in Zamia species in necessary to verify this. These two belid genera are very important pollinators of their host cycads; the larvae feed primarily on the sporophylls.

Alloxycorynus, Balanophorobius, Oxycorynus have been recorded from Balanophoraceae. Specific beetle-plant association are A. bruchi with Ombrophytum, and O. nigripes and O. armatus with Lophophytum. B. gamezi was apparently collected from Helosis cayennensis.

Hydnorobius larvae are recorded from flowers and fruits of Prosopanche (Hydnoraceae). P. americana is host to H. hydnorae and H. helleri; H. parvulus is found on P. bonacinae.

Balanophoraceae and Hydnoraceae are root parasitic rather primitive dicots but not closely related. Possibly, the Oxycorynini which feed on them shifted to these plants from the ones parasitized. It is likely that the initial host switch was to Balanophoraceae, but these parasitize a wide range of trees so little more can be said at present.

=== Gallery of Oxycorynini host plants ===
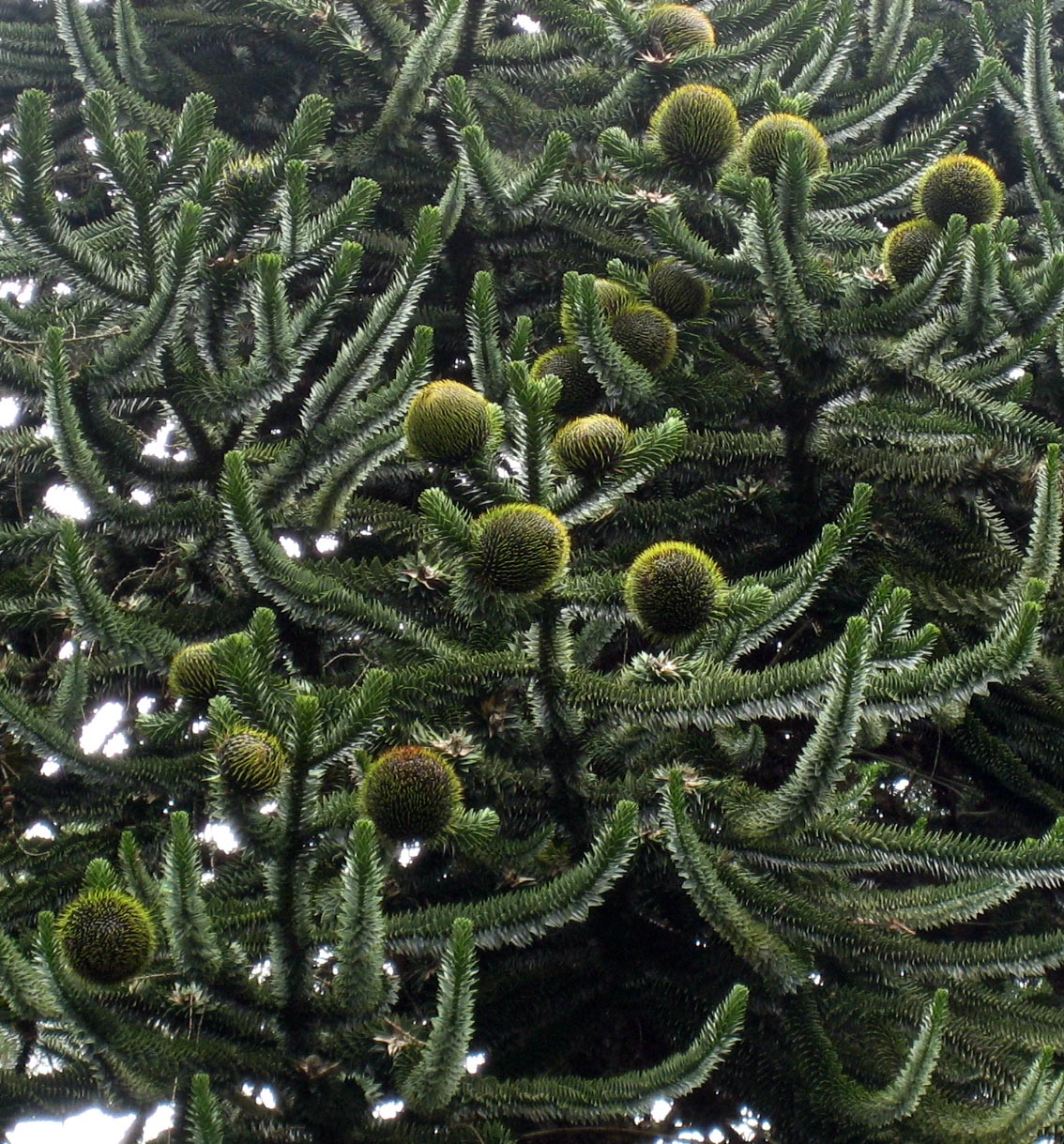
Female cones of monkey-puzzle (Araucaria araucana)

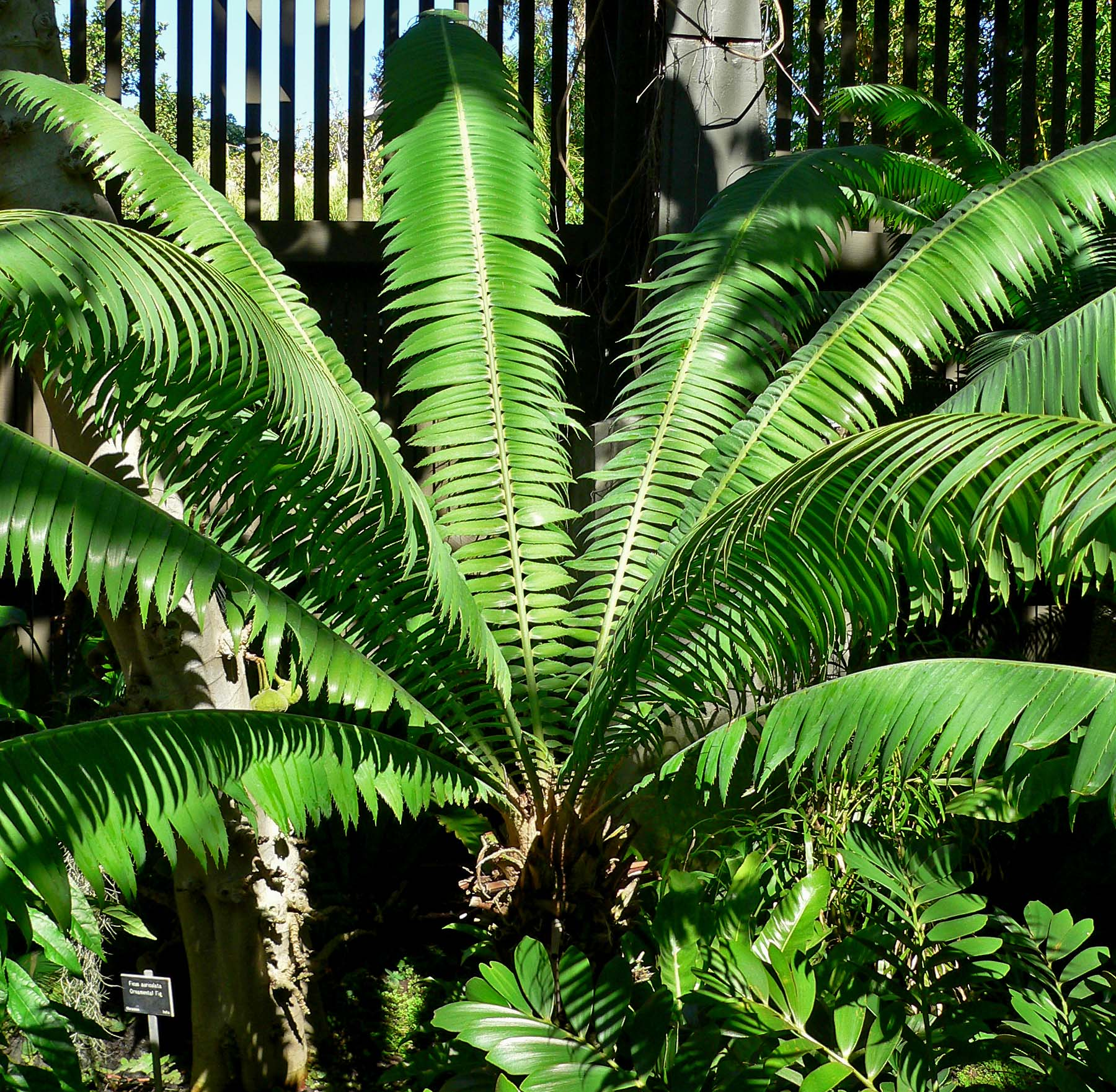
Dioon spinulosum

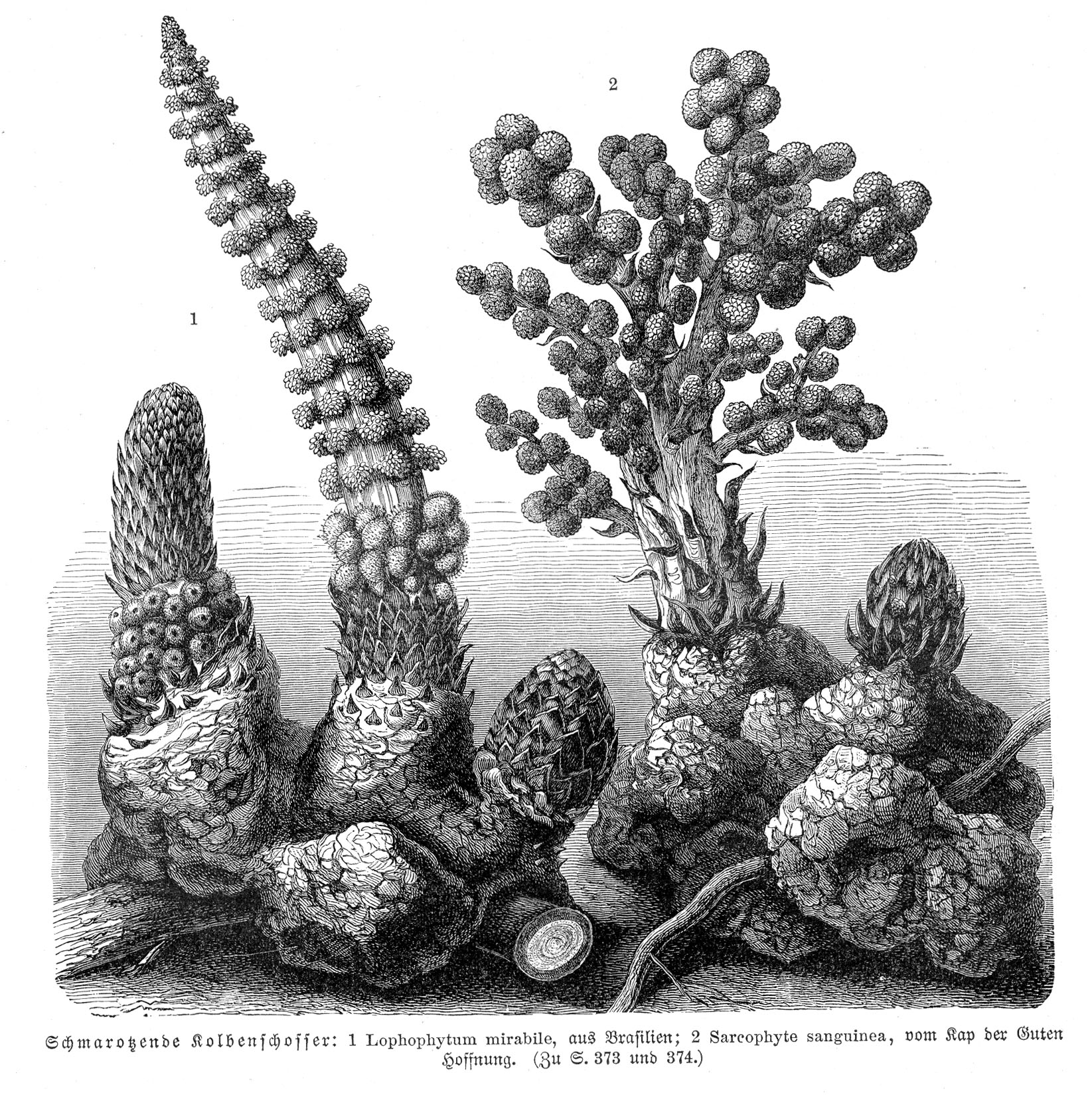
Left: Lophophytum mirabile

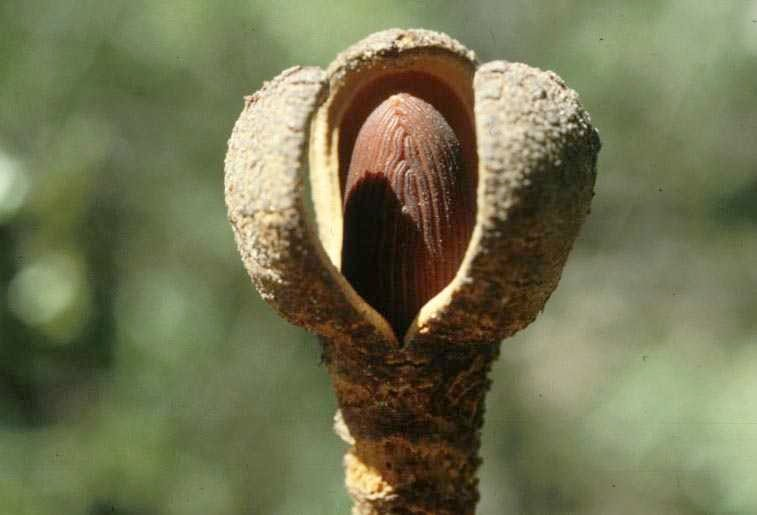
Prosopanche americana inflorescence
