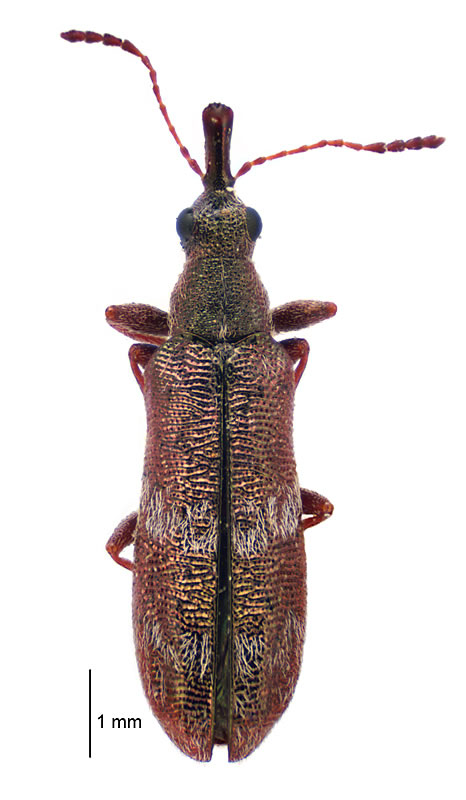
- Rhicnobelus metallicus

Scientific classification
- Kingdom: Animalia
- Phylum: Arthropoda
- Clade: Pancrustacea
- Class: Insecta
- Order: Coleoptera
- Suborder: Polyphaga
- Infraorder: Cucujiformia
- Family: Belidae
- Subfamily: Belinae; Schönherr, 1826

Tribes
- Agnesiotidini; Belini; Pachyurini

= Belinae =

Subfamily of beetles

Belinae are a Gondwanan subfamily of beetles which belong to the belids, primitive weevils of the family Belidae. Like in other belids, their antennae are straight, not elbowed as in the true weevils (Curculionidae). The Belinae make up the bulk of the diversity of living belid genera. They are found in the Australia-New Guinea-New Zealand and South America.

Of the three tribes placed here, the Pachyurini appear to hold the most primitive genera, while the Agnesiotidini might be the most advanced one. The overall delimitation of tribes is not entirely robust though, and particularly the placement of the diverse Belini in respect to the Agnesiotidini is somewhat uncertain. The belids as a whole are of Jurassic origin, and the Belinae must thus date from the Late Jurassic or at most Early Cretaceous, roughly some 150 million years ago.

== Description and ecology ==
Belinae typically have an elongated and cylindrical shape. They can be distinguished from the Oxycoryninae (including the former Aglycyderinae) by a few characters: The scutellum of the Belinae is tipped upwards, with the base hidden by a flange at the elytra bases and the distal end pointing out between the wing bases. The sternite of the metathorax is characteristically swollen. Microscopically, it can be seen that their spermatheca are sickle-shaped, well developed and darkly pigmented. The Agnesiotidini have a groove at the hind margin of the eye, which is missing in the other two tribes.

In the larvae, the posterior margin of the pronotum is enlarged, with a more (Agnesiotidini and Belini) or less (Pachyurini) strongly thickened hind margin. In the Pachyurini, the larvae has an open and divided occipital foramen with ridges on the dorsal emargination and the labrum and epipharynx have paired and divergent paramesal sclerotizations. These are also present but curved in the Agnesiotidini; the labrum-epipharynx of the Belini is unsclerotized. The maxillary malae are densely covered with setae in the Agnesiotidini, it has only a few setae in the others.

Their larvae feed on wood, mostly of Araucariaceae. Certain Belini larvae also feed on the wood of Fabaceae, while some Agnesiotidini take the wood of Myrtaceae. Some Pachyurini larvae eat the developing fruits of Nothofagaceae. Like all Belini, they prefer diseased or dying plants or deadwood to healthy plants.

== Selected genera ==
- Agathobelus
- Agnesiotis
- Apagobelus
- Araiobelus
- Arhinobelus
- Atractuchus
- Basiliobelus
- Belus
- Callirhynchinus
- Cyrotyphus
- Dicordylus
- Habrobelus
- Hadrobelus
- Homalocerus
- Isacantha
- Isacanthodes
- Macrobelus
- Pachybelus
- Pachyura
- Pachyurinus
- Rhinotia
- Rhinotoides
- Sphinctobelus
- Stenobelus
- Trichophthalmus
