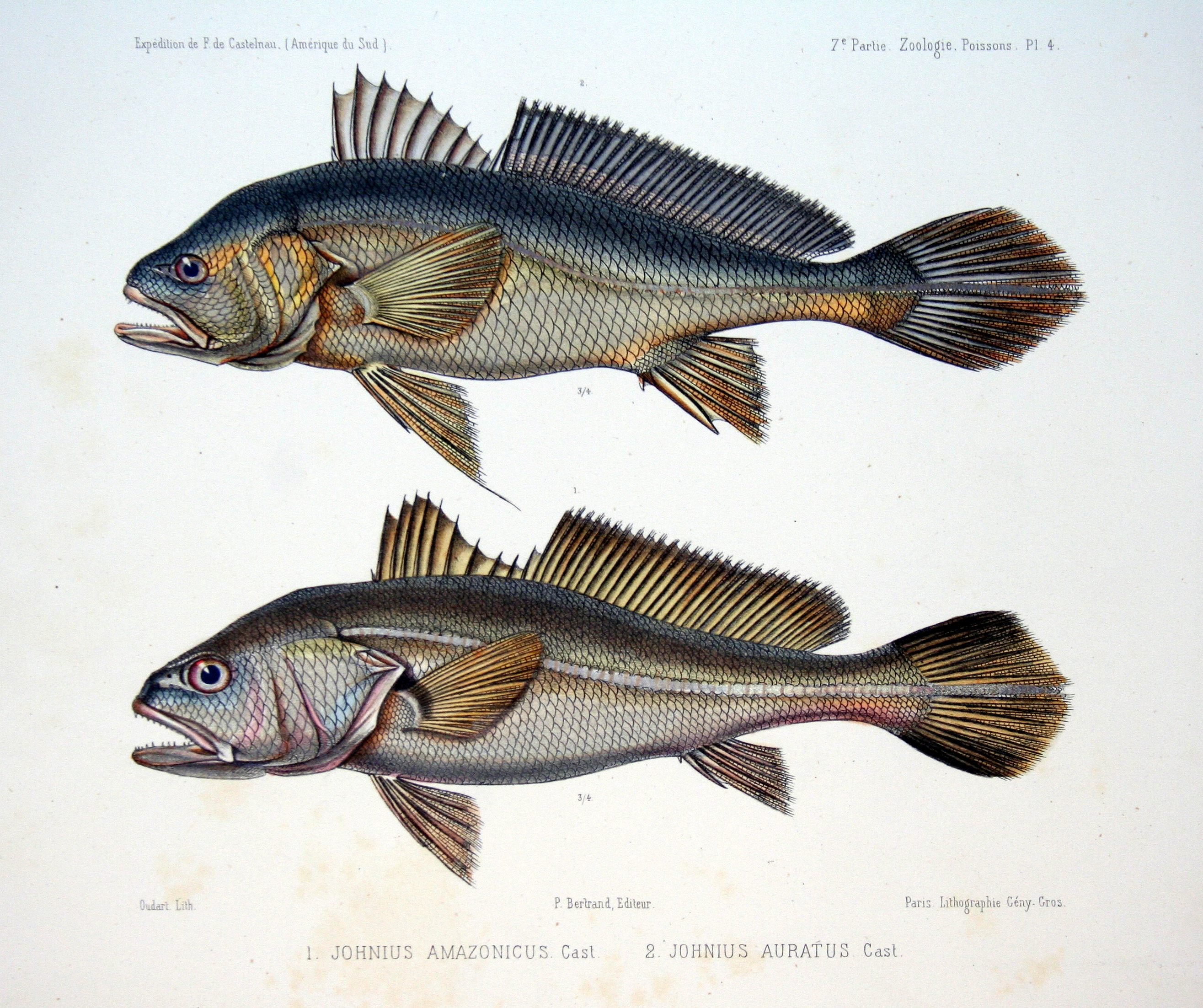
- Plagioscion auratus (above), Plagioscion squamosissimus (below)

Scientific classification
- Kingdom: Animalia
- Phylum: Chordata
- Class: Actinopterygii
- Order: Acanthuriformes
- Family: Sciaenidae
- Genus: Plagioscion; T. N. Gill, 1861

Type species
- Sciaena squamosissima Heckel, 1840

Synonyms
- Diplolepis Steindachner, 1863

= Plagioscion =

Genus of fishes

Plagioscion is a genus of freshwater ray-finned fishes belonging to the family Sciaenidae, the drums and croakers. They are found in tropical and subtropical South America where they inhabit fresh and brackish waters. Some species (notably P. squamosissimus and P. surinamensis) are important food fish and support major fisheries.

Depending on the exact species, they reach up to about 30–80 cm (1.0–2.6 ft) in length. In general, the various species are similar and are not easily separated by meristics or colour.

Plagioscion sometimes occur in schools. They are predators and the adults are essentially piscivorous. The largest in the genus, P. squamosissimus, mainly feeds on fish smaller than 15 cm (6 in), but may take ones up to about 60% of the length of the Plagioscion itself.

Although the family Sciaenidae primarily is marine, there are four genera with freshwater species in South America. In addition to Plagioscion, this is Pachypops, Pachyurus and Petilipinnis.

== Taxonomy ==
Plagoscion was first proposed as a genus in 1861 by the American biologist Theodore Gill without including any species. The type species was later designated as Sciaena squamosissima by Jordan and C. H. Eigenmann, this species had been described in 1840 by Johann Jakob Heckel with its type locality given as Suriname. This genus has been placed in the subfamily Cynoscioninae by some workers, but the 5th edition of Fishes of the World does not recognise subfamilies within the Sciaenidae which it places in the order Acanthuriformes.

== Etymology ==
Plagioscion is a combination of plagio, meaning "oblique", and scion, the modern Greek name of Umbrina cirrosa, which Gill preferred over sciaena because he did not like the sound of Cynosciaena. Gill did not explain what plagio was alluding to but he did mention that the crest and margin of the preoperculum were "oblique, nearly parallel".

== Species ==
FishBase currently recognizes 7 species in this genus. The validity of P. casattii and P. surinamensis are questionable (both possibly junior synonyms of P. squamosissimus). In contrast, genetic analysis indicates that two currently unrecognized, cryptic species exist.

- Plagioscion auratus Castelnau, 1855 (Black curbinata)
- Plagioscion casattii Aguilera & de Aguilera, 2001
- Plagioscion montei Soares & Casatti, 2000
- Plagioscion pauciradiatus Steindachner, 1917
- Plagioscion squamosissimus Heckel, 1840 (South American silver croaker)
- Plagioscion surinamensis Bleeker, 1873 (Pacora)
- Plagioscion ternetzi Boulenger, 1895 (Freshwater croaker)

Catalog of Fishes includes the following species:

- Plagioscion auratus (Castelnau, 1855)
- Plagioscion magdalenae (Steindachner, 1878)
- Plagioscion microps Steindachner, 1917
- Plagioscion montei Soares & Casatti, 2000
- Plagioscion pauciradiatus Steindachner 1917
- Plagioscion squamosissimus (Heckel 1840)
- Plagioscion ternetzi Boulenger 1895

P. casattii and P. surinamensis are treated as synonyms of P. squamosissmus.
