= Trichophthalmus =

Scientific classification
- Kingdom: Animalia
- Phylum: Arthropoda
- Class: Insecta
- Order: Coleoptera
- Suborder: Polyphaga
- Infraorder: Cucujiformia
- Family: Belidae
- Subfamily: Belinae
- Genus: Trichophthalmus

Genus of beetles

Trichophthalmus is a genus of beetles which belong to the family Belidae.
