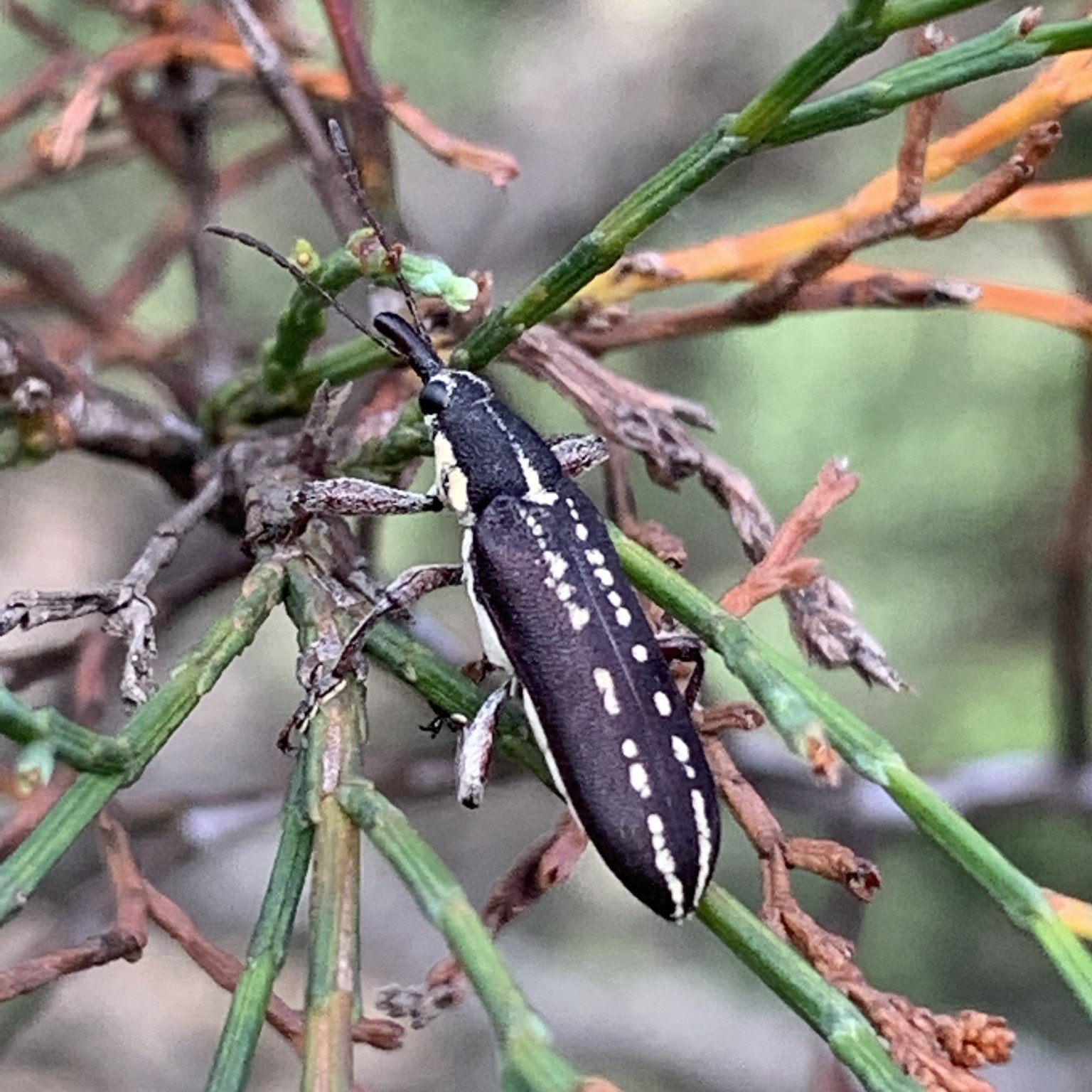
- Isacanthodes ganglionicus

Scientific classification
- Kingdom: Animalia
- Phylum: Arthropoda
- Class: Insecta
- Order: Coleoptera
- Suborder: Polyphaga
- Infraorder: Cucujiformia
- Family: Belidae
- Subfamily: Belinae
- Genus: Isacanthodes; Zimmerman, 1994

Species
- Isacanthodes ganglionica Zimmerman, 1994; Isacanthodes monilis Zimmerman, 1994

= Isacanthodes =

Genus of beetles

Isacanthodes is a genus of beetles in the family Belidae.
