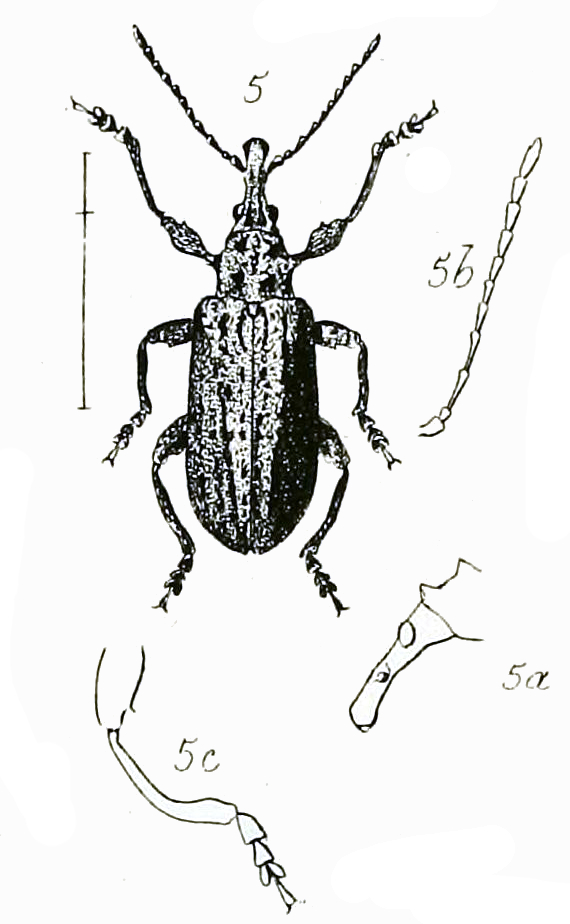
- Cyrotyphus fascicularis Pascoe, 1870 with a)lateral view of head, b)antenna and c}hindleg

Scientific classification
- Kingdom: Animalia
- Phylum: Arthropoda
- Class: Insecta
- Order: Coleoptera
- Suborder: Polyphaga
- Infraorder: Cucujiformia
- Family: Belidae
- Subfamily: Belinae
- Genus: Cyrotyphus

= Cyrotyphus =

Genus of beetles

Cyrotyphus is a genus of beetles which belong to the family Belidae.
