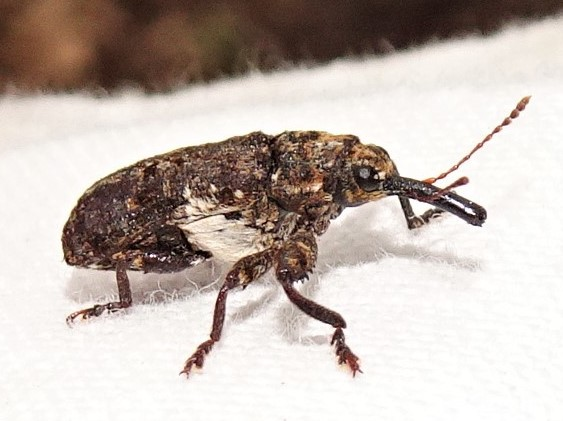
- Isacantha dermestiventris

Scientific classification
- Kingdom: Animalia
- Phylum: Arthropoda
- Class: Insecta
- Order: Coleoptera
- Suborder: Polyphaga
- Infraorder: Cucujiformia
- Family: Belidae
- Subfamily: Belinae
- Genus: Isacantha; Hope, 1833

= Isacantha =

Genus of beetles

Isacantha is a genus of beetles in the family Belidae.
