= Rhopalotria mollis =

Scientific classification
- Kingdom: Animalia
- Phylum: Arthropoda
- Class: Insecta
- Order: Coleoptera
- Suborder: Polyphaga
- Infraorder: Cucujiformia
- Family: Belidae
- Genus: Rhopalotria
- Species: R. mollis

Binomial name
- Rhopalotria mollis (Sharp, 1890)

Species of beetle

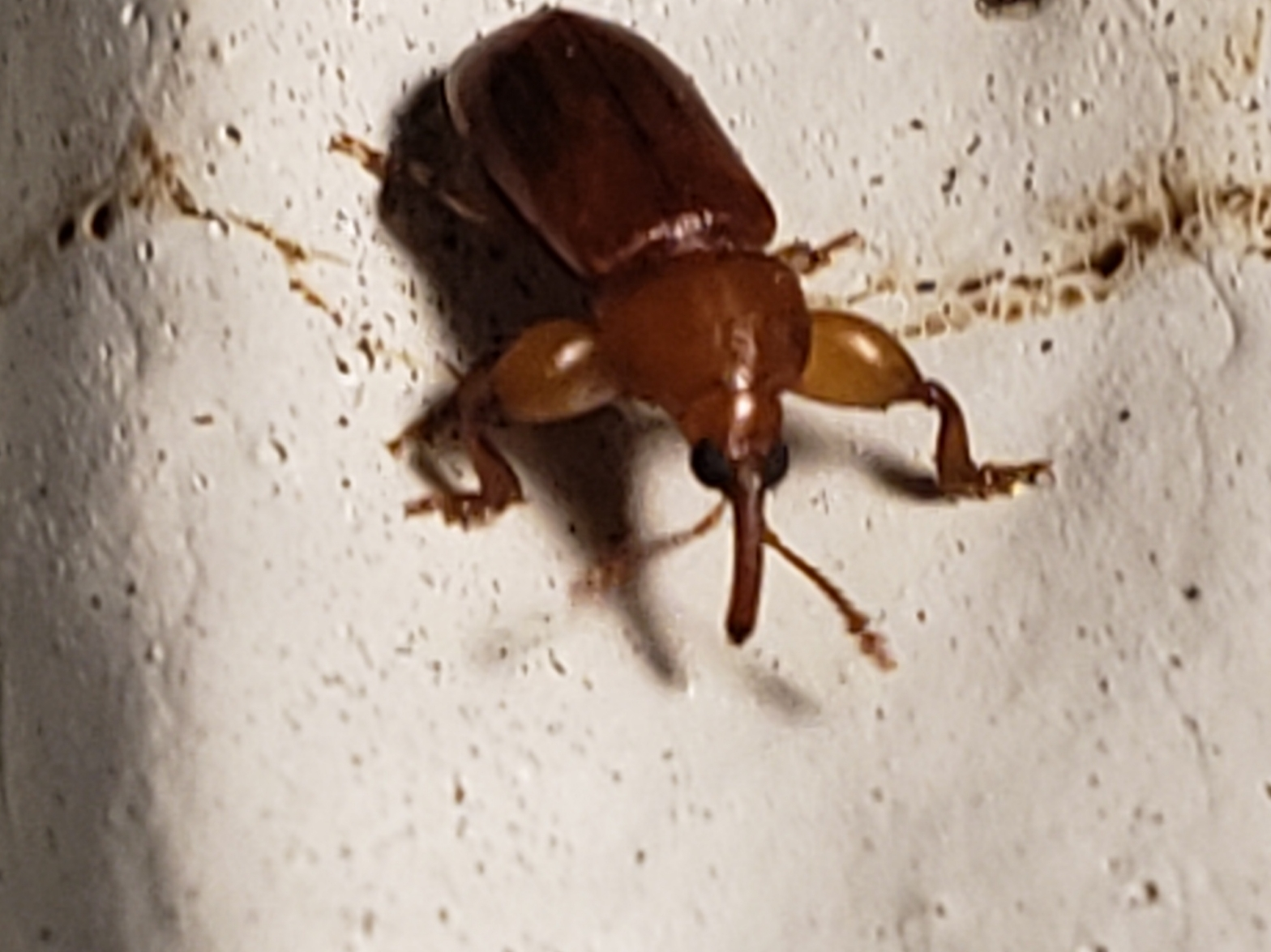
Right

Rhopalotria mollis is a species of cycad weevil in the beetle family Belidae.
