= Lucky stone =

Otolith of freshwater drum

A lucky stone is actually the unique ear bone or otolith of a freshwater drum (Aplodinotus grunniens), also known as the sheephead fish. The fish's otoliths are quite large and look almost polished and ivory-like. In times past they have been worn as protective amulets, made into jewelry, and traded into areas far from the fish's native range (such as Utah and California). Lucky stones (otoliths) have been found at ancient archaeological sites, where they are thought to have been used as good luck charms to ward off illness.

Lucky stones wash up on beaches along the Great Lakes, especially Lake Erie. This white "stone" is desirable to collectors as the letter L and the letter J appear naturally on these "lucky stones". The J stones come from the right side of the fish and the L stones come from the left side of the freshwater drum.

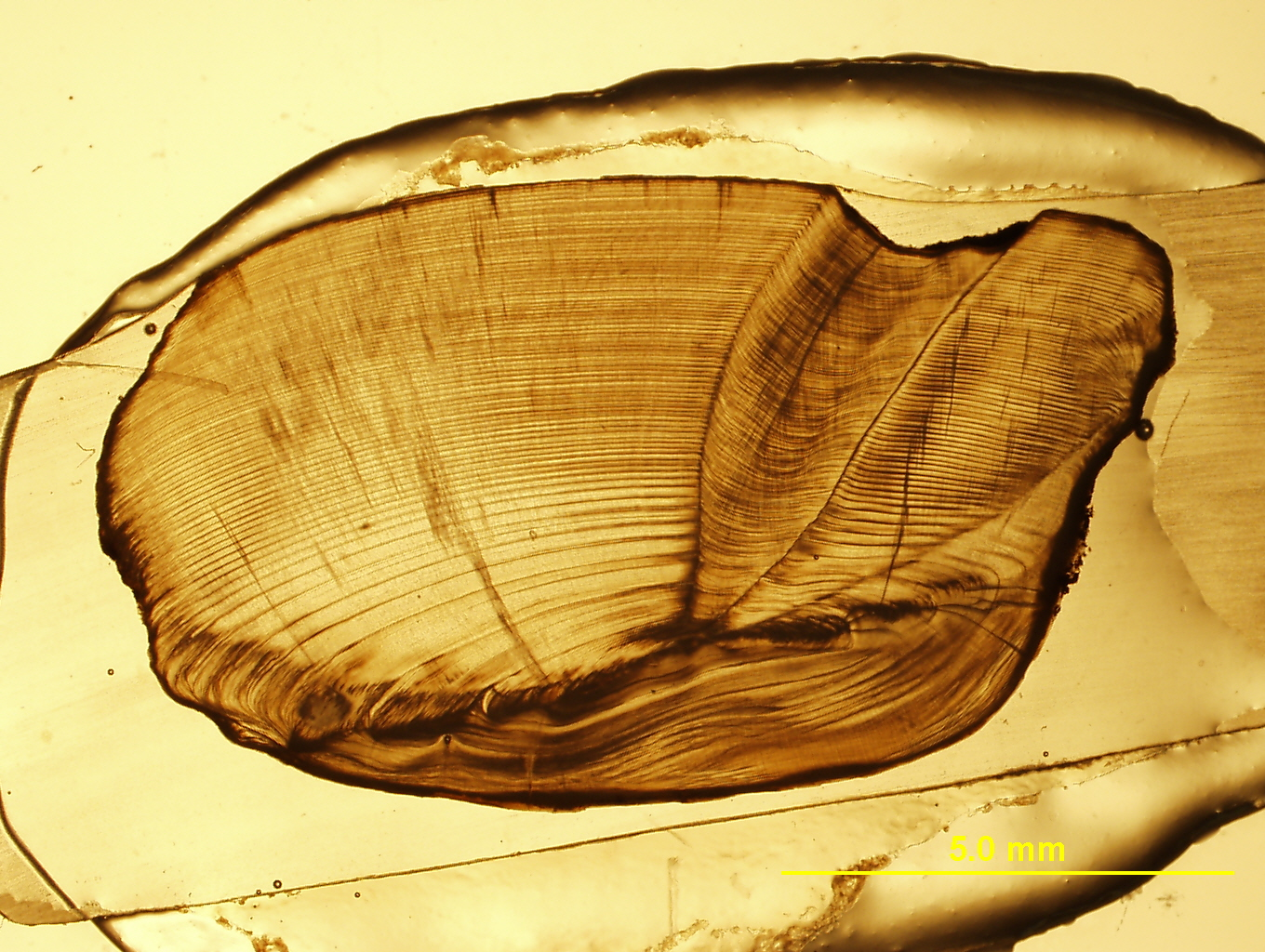
Magnified view of freshwater drum otolith showing growth bands

University of Minnesota Biologist George R. Spangler gives a technical explanation of the "letters" which appear on the lucky stone. "The 'L-shaped groove' is technically known as a 'sulcus'. In the living fish, the sulcus is adjacent to a series of neuromast cells in the inner ear. Pressure exerted upon these neuromasts by movement of the otolith due to gravity or to acceleration of the fish provides information to the brain regarding the orientation of the fish's body."

Many beachcombers walk the beaches in the morning as the waves tend to wash small rocks, "beach glass" and lucky stones to the shore on a daily basis. Lucky stones are also known in other freshwater areas of North America. David Starr Jones notes that "the otoliths of the river-drum are known to Wisconsin boys as 'lucky stones' each having a rude impress of the letter L."
