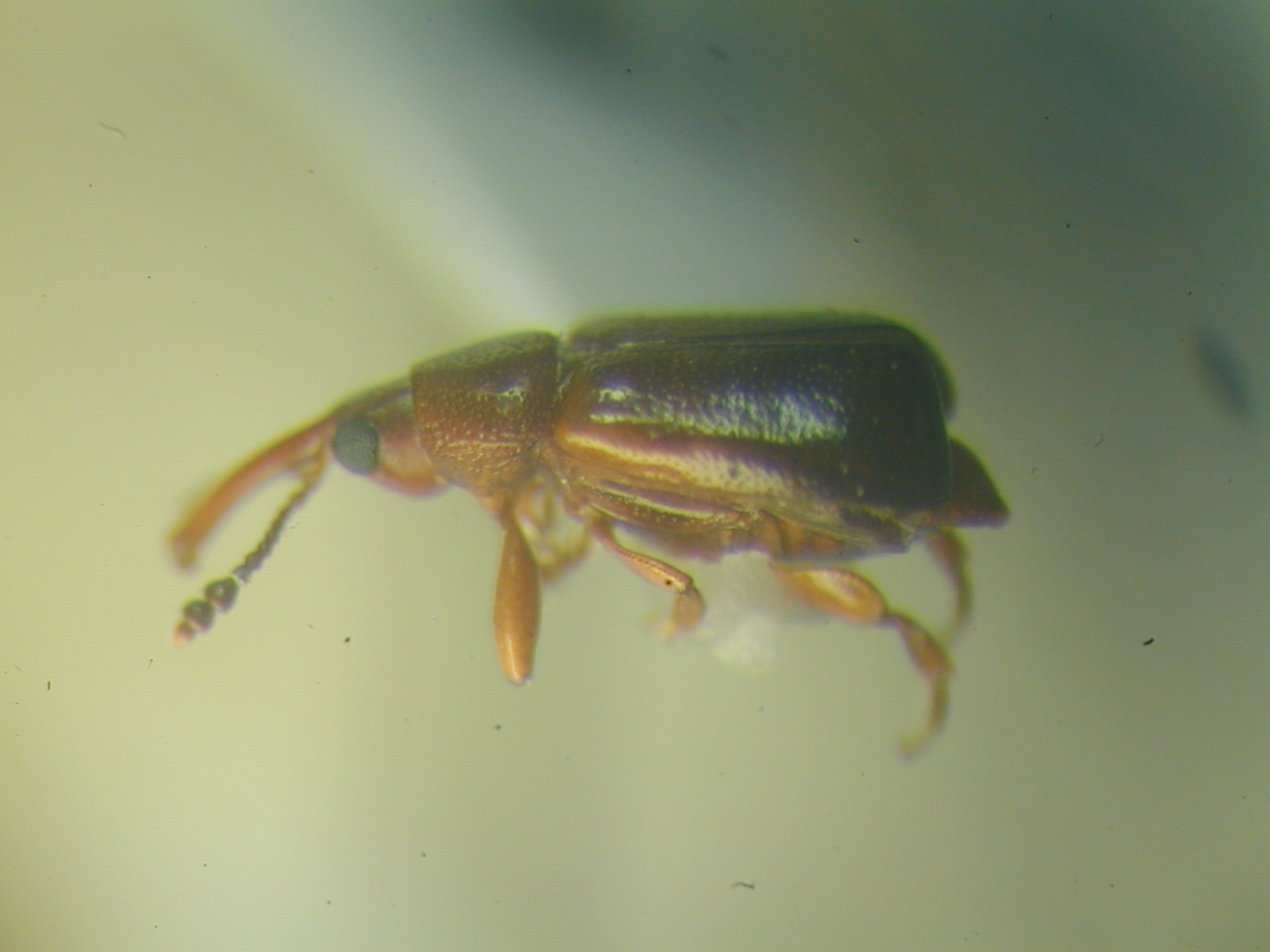
- Female Rhopalotria dimidiata (Oxycorynini) in profile view. Note shape of head.

Scientific classification
- Kingdom: Animalia
- Phylum: Arthropoda
- Clade: Pancrustacea
- Class: Insecta
- Order: Coleoptera
- Suborder: Polyphaga
- Infraorder: Cucujiformia
- Superfamily: Curculionoidea
- Family: Belidae
- Subfamily: Oxycoryninae; Schönherr, 1840

Tribes
- Aglycyderini (but see text); Metrioxenini; Oxycorynini

Synonyms
- Oxycorynidae

= Oxycoryninae =

Subfamily of beetles

Oxycoryninae are subfamily of primitive weevils of the family Belidae, but sometimes treated as a distinct family Oxycorynidae. Like in other belids, their antennae are straight, not elbowed as in the true weevils (Curculionidae), and their larvae feed on the wood of diseased or dying plants or on deadwood or fruits; they tend to avoid healthy plants.

The Oxycoryninae contain a mere 13 living genera altogether, more than half of which are in the tribe Oxycorynini. Of the three tribes recognized here, two are very small but one of these, the Aglycyderini, are often treated as a distinct subfamily. However, they share several traits with other Oxycoryninae, especially with the Metrioxenini (the other minor tribe). The fossil record shows that the three tribes were well distinct by the mid-Paleogene, about 50 million years ago. The belids as a whole are of Jurassic origin, and the Oxycoryninae must thus date from the Late Jurassic or at most Early Cretaceous, roughly some 150 million years ago.

Oxycoryninae, as defined by Pascoe in 1870, refers to what today is the tribe Oxycorynini. Oxycorynidae, as defined by Kolbe in 1908, also refers to the Oxycorynini.

== Description ==
Except in the Aglycyderini, the rostrum ("snout") of adult Oxycoryninae is located high on the head and the underside of the head is very much rounded; this can be appreciated in profile. The second funicle segment is not longer than the first and may be shorter.

The mesothoracal sternite is flattened but between the second leg pair there is a protrusion projecting at an angle of about 45°. The procoxa has no visible suture except the hole through which the trochanter tip (onto which the procoxa latches) can be seen. The first tarsal segment is tiny (shorter than the second one) and hardly visible.

In the larvae, the antennae are reduced to a single segment, which bears the sensorium on a little knob. The apical segment of the maxillary palpus carries no setae, and the labium has no strut. The spiracles have soft walls without sclerotized rings.

== Notable genera ==
- Aglycyderes (Aglycyderini) – occurs more than 15,000 km (9,300 mi) away from its closest living relatives.
- Metrioxena (Metrioxenini) – prehistoric species may have lived 50 million years ago.
- Parallocorynus and Rhopalotria (Oxycorynini) – the "cycad beetles" of Florida, Cuba and Central America.
