= Agathobelus =

Scientific classification
- Kingdom: Animalia
- Phylum: Arthropoda
- Clade: Pancrustacea
- Class: Insecta
- Order: Coleoptera
- Suborder: Polyphaga
- Infraorder: Cucujiformia
- Superfamily: Curculionoidea
- Family: Belidae
- Genus: Agathobelus; Zimmerman, 1994
- Species: A. bivittatus

Binomial name
- Agathobelus bivittatus Zimmerman, 1994

Genus of beetles

Agathobelus is a monotypic genus of weevils in the family Belidae. The sole species is Agathobelus bivittatus, which is known from Australia.
