= Metrioxenini =

Scientific classification
- Kingdom: Animalia
- Phylum: Arthropoda
- Clade: Pancrustacea
- Class: Insecta
- Order: Coleoptera
- Suborder: Polyphaga
- Infraorder: Cucujiformia
- Superfamily: Curculionoidea
- Family: Belidae
- Subfamily: Oxycoryninae
- Tribe: Metrioxenini; Voss, 1953

Genera
- Afrocorynus; Hispodes; Metrioxena and see text

Synonyms
- Metrioxeninae Zherikhin & Gratshev, 1995

Tribe of beetles

Metrioxenini (metrioxenines) are a tribe of belids, primitive weevils of the family Belidae, containing about 30 species. They are only found in two widely separated areas, Southeast Asia extending to Indonesia, and South Africa. In the Paleogene, they were found at least in North America and Europe also, occurring perhaps across the entire Northern Hemisphere.

As in other belids, their antennae are straight, not elbowed as in the true weevils (Curculionidae). They are far less characteristic than their presumed closest living relatives, the Aglycyderini. They can be recognized by the sharp-sided rostrum ("snout"). Also, their eyes are bordered by a wide and ridged groove. Metrioxena shows two sharp ribs on each elytron, which are absent in the other genera. These, by contrast, have their tarsal claws fused together at the base (they are unfused in Metrioxena) and grooves on the pygidium which are absent in Metrioxena.

== Distribution and ecology ==
The type genus Metrioxena contains twelve described species apart from the fossil ones mentioned below. They are today restricted to parts Southeast Asia, extending into the Indonesian archipelago. Roughly, they occur between Thailand and the Philippines and from Malaysia to the Tanimbar Islands. They have been found on Sumatra, Java, Sulawesi and offshore Ternate but are hitherto unknown from Borneo and the Lesser Sunda Islands where they conceivably might also occur. Considering that in the Paleogene the genus (or very close relatives) were found in North America and Europe, it may well be that the present distribution is a relict of a formerly Holarctic range. The Paleogene was warmer than our time, and the climate in today's temperate latitudes was by then indeed more like that in today's Southeast Asia.

Afrocorynus contains presently two described species, which are only known to occur in the mountains and hills that extend on the southern coast of South Africa, between Mosselbay in the west, Grahamstown in the east, and the Karoo inland. Hispodes occurs in similar habitat extending eastwards and inland, with the single described species (H. spicatus) found hitherto only in the Katberg region, and an undescribed species known from the Drakensberg escarpment south of Tzaneen.

=== Larval host plants ===
Metrioxena apparently feed only on Arenga sugar palms (Arecaceae). Larvae, though little is known about them, are probably eating the wood of dead or dying trees, while the adults eat pollen. The Paleogene fossil Metrioxena electrica was found in conifer amber from the Baltic region, where palms are known to have grown some 50 million years ago.

The South African species seem to be dependent on the Knysna-Amatole montane forests biome. Very little is known about their host plants. The first specimen of Afrocorynus asparagi was found on "wild asparagus" but this seems a most unlikely host plant for Belidae; in any case it has never again been found on an Asparagus species but only on Putterlickia pyracantha (Celastraceae). Hispodes spicatus has not been recorded from any other plant than Rhoicissus tridentata (Vitaceae). And though the Knysna-Amatole montane forests hold the conifers Podocarpus and African cypress (Widdringtonia), which seem plausible host plants considering what other Belidae feed on, the Rosidae P. pyracantha and R. tridentata actually grown in shrubby habitat interspersed with the actual montane forest. It may be that H. spicatus larvae feed - atypically for the family - on flower buds, as they have not been found in immature fruits which, apart from wood, are the other known food-type of Belidae larvae. More probably, they feed on the decaying wood like most of their relatives.

Presumably, the original host plants of belid larvae were conifers, namely Araucariaceae. From there the Metrioxenini shifted to palms. The African lineages might have host-shifted to the Rosidae shrubs directly (from conifers) or indirectly (via palms, which used to occur in their present range but eventually disappeared). This issue could be resolved by checking whether the Pondoland palm (Jubaeopsis afra), the only survivor from the original palmtree flora of Southern Africa, is host to a metrioxenine.

== Systematics and evolution ==
The three currently recognized living genera of Metrioxenini are occasionally assigned to subtribes, that seem almost superfluous, as it seems that the presently monotypic Metrioxenina simply represent a more basal lineage and the Afrocorynina (Afrocorynus and Hispodes) a more advanced one. But the relationship among the genera is not resolved with complete certainty. Indeed, Metrioxena was sometimes placed in the Oxycoryninae and the Afrocorynina elevated to full tribe status, but this seems to be in error. It is possible that Metrioxena iwill eventually be split up into several genera (e.g. Prometrioxena). Hispodes on the other hand is occasionally separated in a subtribe of Hispodini, which Marvaldi and co-writers 2006 find to be an unwarranted arrangement, since it would render all subtribes monotypic and thus redundant.

The fossil record shows that the Metrioxenini were well distinct by the mid-Paleogene, about 50 million years ago (mya). The belids as a whole are of Jurassic origin, and the Metrioxenini must thus have evolved in the Late Cretaceous or perhaps Paleocene, roughly some 100-60 mya.

There are three fossil species of Metrioxenini known to date: Paltorhynchus bisulcatus of the Early Eocene Green River Formation and "Paltorhynchus" narwhal from the latest Eocene or earliest Oligocene of the Florissant Fossil Beds are both from North America. If the latter species actually belongs in the modern genus Metrioxena, since it is the type species of Paltorhynchus, that name would become a junior synonym of Metrioxena and a new genus would have to be established for the more primitive "P." bisulcatus. That species might represent another genus of the Metrioxenina or a still more basal member of the tribe. Metrioxena electrica known from Baltic amber and of comparable age to the North American fossils, is sometimes separated in Archimetrioxena.
