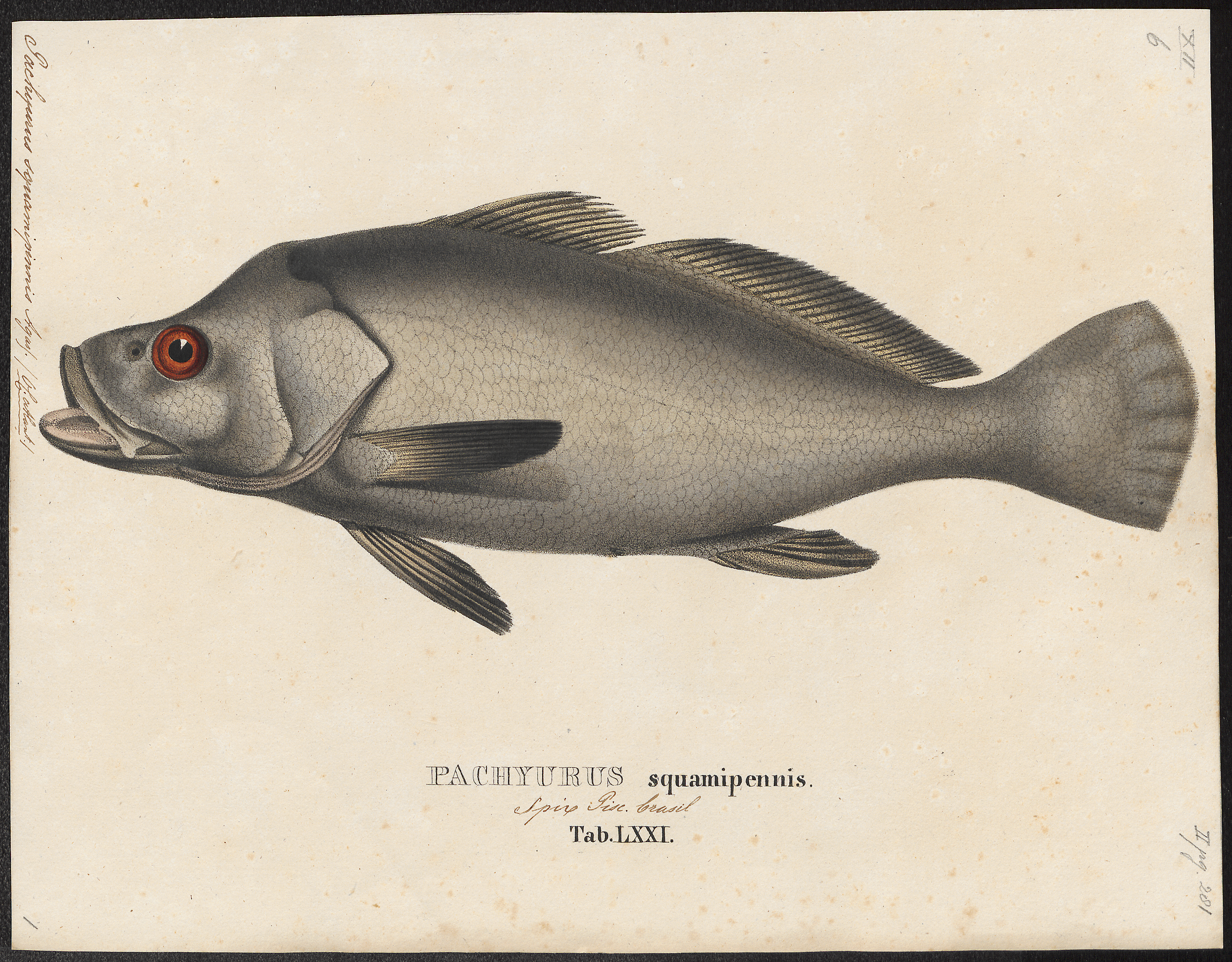
- Pachyurus squamipinnis

Scientific classification
- Kingdom: Animalia
- Phylum: Chordata
- Class: Actinopterygii
- Order: Acanthuriformes
- Family: Sciaenidae
- Genus: Pachyurus; Agassiz, 1831

Type species
- Pachyurus squamipennis Agassiz, 1831

Species
- see text

Synonyms
- Lepipterus Cuvier, 1830

= Pachyurus =

Genus of freshwater fishes

Pachyurus is a genus of freshwater ray-finned fishes belonging to the family Sciaenidae, the drums and croakers. The ten recognised species in the genus are found in South America.

== Taxonomy ==
Pachyurus was first proposed as a genus in 1831 by the Swiss born American naturalist Louis Agassiz when he described the new species Pachyurus squamipennis, with a type locality given as Januária on the São Francisco River, Minas Gerais, in Brazil. The genus Pachyurus is included in the subfamily Pachyurinae by some workers, but the 5th edition of Fishes of the World does not recognise subfamilies within the Sciaenidae, which it places in the order Acanthuriformes. In addition, Pachyurinae, is an invalid name as it is preoccupied by a tribe of cycad weevils, the Pachyurini Kuschel, 1959 .

== Etymology ==
Pachyurus is a combination of pachy, meaning "thick", and oura, which means "tail". This is an allusion to the dense covering of scales on the caudal fin of the type species, P. squamipennis.

== Species ==
Pachyurus contains ten described, recognised species:

- Pachyurus adspersus Steindachner, 1879 (Brazilian croaker)
- Pachyurus bonariensis Steindachner, 1879 (La Plata croaker)
- Pachyurus calhamazon Casatti, 2001
- Pachyurus francisci (Cuvier 1830) (San Francisco croaker)
- Pachyurus gabrielensis Casatti, 2001
- Pachyurus junki Soares & Casatti, 2000
- Pachyurus paucirastrus Aguilera, 1983
- Pachyurus schomburgkii Günther, 1860 (Amazon croaker)
- Pachyurus squamipennis Agassiz, 1831
- Pachyurus stewarti Casatti & Chao, 2002

== Characteristics ==
Pachyurus croakers have a moderately elongated body with a sounded, slightly high dorsal profile and a straight or slightly arched, ventral profile. They have a conical head with a swollen and blunt snout. The mouth is horizontal and may be terminal or below the snout. The eyes are moderately large to large. The snout has five marginal pores, typically they lack upper pores but these are present in some species. The chin has five pores but no barbels. The second spine of the anal fin is moderately sized or robust. These are relatively small croakers, the largest species is P. junki with a maximum published total length of 35.5 cm (14.0 in).

== Distribution ==
Pachyurus croakers are found in freshwater habitats in South America from Guyana south to Argentina.One species, the La Plata croaker (P. bonariensis), is an invasive, non native species in the Lagoa Mirim and Lagoa dos Patos systems in Uruguay and Brazil where it is already numerous enough to be important in commercial fisheries in these lakes. They reached these lakes either by deliberate introduction or by moving from the nearby river systems through flooded rice fields.
