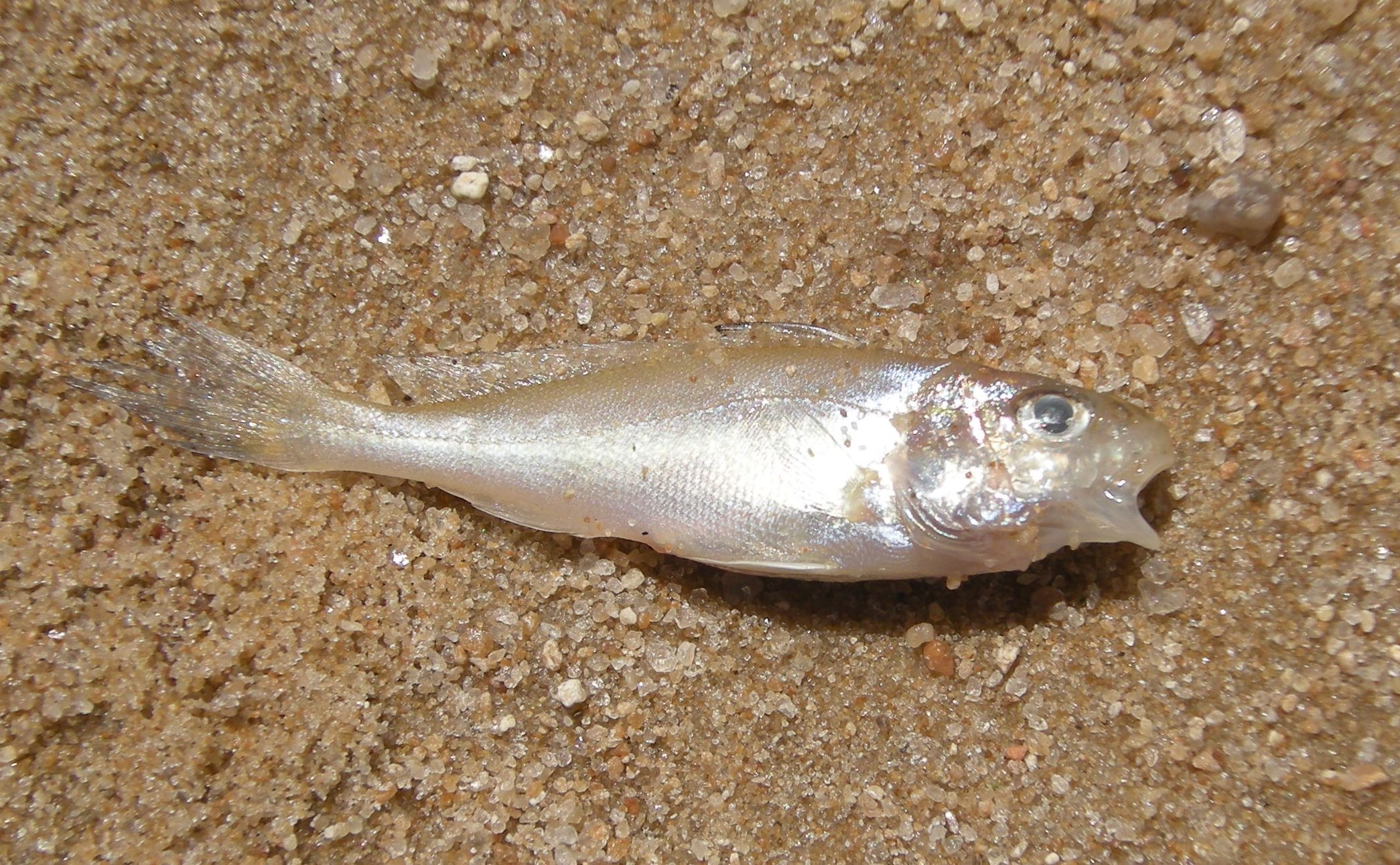
- Pachypops fourcroi

Scientific classification
- Kingdom: Animalia
- Phylum: Chordata
- Class: Actinopterygii
- Order: Acanthuriformes
- Family: Sciaenidae
- Genus: Pachypops; Gill, 1861

Type species
- Micropogon trifilis Müller & Troschel 1849

Species
- see text

= Pachypops =

Small genus of freshwater ray-finned fishes

Pachypops is a small genus of freshwater ray-finned fishes belonging to the family Sciaenidae, the drums and croakers. The three recognised species in the genus are found in South America.

== Taxonomy ==
Pachypops was first proposed as a genus in 1861 by the American biologist Theodore Gill with Micropogon trifilis designated as its type species, and only species. Micropogon trifilis was originally described in 1849 by the German zoologists Johannes Peter Müller and Franz Hermann Troschel with its type locality given as British Guiana. The genus Pachypops is included in the subfamily Pachyurinae by some workers, but the 5th edition of Fishes of the World does not recognise subfamilies within the Sciaenidae, which it places in the order Acanthuriformes.

== Etymology ==
Pachypops combines pachy, maiming “thick”, with ops, which means “eye”. Gill did not state why he gave the genus this name but it may be an allusion to the large eyes or swollen suborbital area of the type species.

== Species ==
Pachypops contains three described, recognised species:

- Pachypops fourcroi Lacépède, 1802 (Guyana croaker)
- Pachypops pigmaeus Casatti, 2002
- Pachypops trifilis Müller & Troschel 1849

== Characteristics ==
Pachypops croakers share the following characteristics: they have a mouth set below the snout, there are three barbels on the chin, there are two long rearwards extending appendages on the swim bladder, each branching off from a short forward pointing appendage and they have an elongated haemal spine on the first caudal vertebra. The smallest species in the genus is P. pignaeus which has a maximum published standard length of 5.6 cm (2.2 in) while the largest is P. fourcroi with a maximum published total length of 25 cm (9.8 in).

== Distribution ==
Pachypops croakers are found in the rivers of tropical South America which drain into the Western Atlantic Ocean from the Orinoco east through the rivers of Guyana, Suriname and French Guiana to the Amazon basin of Brazil.
