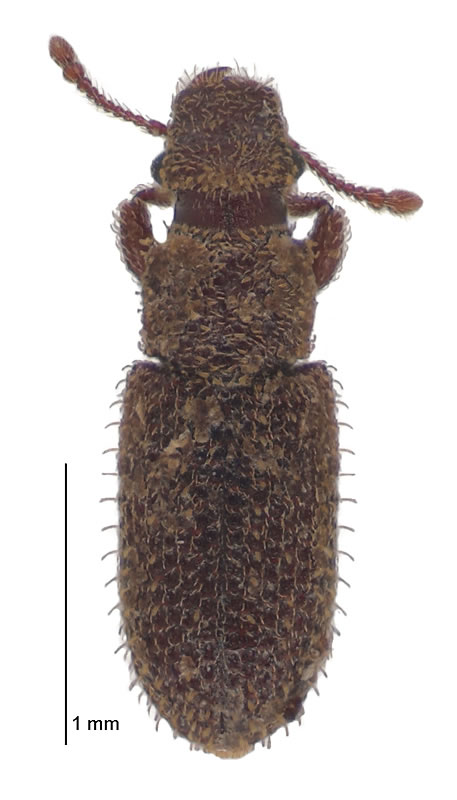
- Aralius wollastoni

Scientific classification
- Kingdom: Animalia
- Phylum: Arthropoda
- Clade: Pancrustacea
- Class: Insecta
- Order: Coleoptera
- Suborder: Polyphaga
- Infraorder: Cucujiformia
- Family: Belidae
- Subfamily: Oxycoryninae
- Tribe: Aglycyderini; Wollaston, 1864

Genera
- Aglycyderes; Aralius; Proterhinus

Synonyms
- List: Aglycideridae Uyttenboogaart, 1937 (lapsus); Aglycyderinae Wollaston, 1864; Aglycyderinini (lapsus); Aglycyderitae Paulian, 1944; Aglycyderoidea Pierce, 1916; Platycephalitae Paulian, 1944; Proterhinidae Sharp, 1899; Proterhinides Fauvel, 1891; Proterhinini Fauvel, 1903; Proterrhinidae Kolbe, 1908; Proterrhinoidea Ienistea 1986 (lapsus)

= Aglycyderini =

Tribe of beetles

Aglycyderini is a tribe of belids, primitive weevils of the family Belidae. Like in other belids, their antennae are straight, not elbowed as in the true weevils (Curculionidae). They occur only on the Pacific Islands and in the Macaronesian region.

== Description ==
The Aglycyderini have several highly distinctive characters as adults: The rostrum of adult Aglycyderini is very short compared to the average belid and attaches exactly symmetrically at the tip of the head; at first glance, do not look "snouted" but merely somewhat long-headed. Viewed in profile, the head is flat-sided and almost triangular in males, and somewhat swollen and rounded in females. The prementum is large and prevents the maxillae from being seen from below. The sternite of the mesothorax is slightly convex and extends to between the midlegs in a smooth inward curve. That tarsus, lacking the first segment, is pseudotrimerous. The outer edges of the second tarsal segment are rounded. In females, the ninth tergite is changed into a thin membrane. Intestinally, they show well-developed proventricular blades with sharp external ridges, and a hindgut with rectal loop.

== Systematics and evolution ==
The Aglycyderini contain a mere 3 living genera, though Proterhinus has more than 165 species courtesy of fulminant adaptive radiation in the Hawaiian Islands. The genera do not differ very much and the Aglycyderini cannot be divided into subtribes. And though Aglycyderes seems to be the most distinct, the relationship between the genera is not all too well resolved.

Often, the Aglycyderini are treated as a distinct subfamily Aglycyderinae. Sometimes, this is due to the Oxycoryninae being treated as a family of their own rather than as a part of the Belidae. Other authors treat them as a subfamily of the Belidae. However, they share many traits with the Metrioxenini and are thus better treated as one of the three main lineages of the Oxycoryninae. The fossil record of the Metrioxenini shows that they were well distinct by the mid-Paleogene, about 50 million years ago (mya). The belids as a whole are of Jurassic origin, and the Aglycyderini must thus have evolved in the Late Cretaceous or perhaps Paleocene, roughly some 100-60 mya.

== Distribution ==
The distribution of the Aglycyderini is very puzzling. The genus Aglycyderes contains one species in the Canary Islands and one in nearby Morocco. The genus Aralius has one named species in New Zealand and one named and two known but undescribed species in New Caledonia. Proterhinus with its 167 or so known species is found mainly in the Hawaiian Islands. Three of its species are found on the Marquesas Islands, three others in the neighboring Society and Austral Islands (and several undescribed ones are known from the latter group), and one from Phoenix Island between the Marquesas and Hawaii. Another undescribed species has been reported from Fiji. Finally, Proterhinus samoae is an originally Samoan species that feeds on Coconut Palms (Cocos nucifera) and has been widely dispersed to coconut plantations across Melanesia, Micronesia and Polynesia.

It is not clear why there are no Aglycyderini in Australia, and though their distribution looks clearly relictual, this does not answer the question how these weevils should have arrived in the Macaronesian region: there is no record of them from the more than 15,000 km (9,300 mi) between Morocco and Micronesia.

== Ecology ==
As far as is known, their larvae like those of other Belidae feed on the wood and fruits of diseased or dying plants or on deadwood; they tend to avoid healthy plants. Aglycyderes larvae feed on the dead wood of spurges (Euphorbia, Euphorbiaceae). Aralius larvae eat deadwood of Pseudopanax (Araliaceae). The larvae of most Proterhinus also live on deadwood (some are leaf miners), but are found on a wide range of plants, unusual for belids which tend to have coevolved with their host plants since the Mesozoic.

There is no clear opinion of the host plants of the ancestral Aglycyderini, but their present-day host plants suggests that they were more likely than not rather advanced eudicots. This also would support the view that the Aglycyderini evolved not in the Jurassic or Early Cretaceous, and consequently justify their treatment as tribe of the Oxycoryninae.

=== Recorded host plants of Proterhinus ===
As can be seen below, the host plants of Proterhinus are more limited by what is available on their remote island homes than other factors like what chemical defences (like alkaloids and terpenoids) the beetles must overcome. It stands to note however that some of the plant families that are more noxious to herbivores - like Lamiaceae (labiates) or Solanaceae (nightshades) - are missing despite being technically available. On the other hand, the Rubiaceae (which are usually rich in alkaloids) are the family with the most recorded host genera. Classification of the host plants is from Plant Systematics: A Phylogenetic Approach.

Ferns:

- Cibotiaceae: hāpuʻu (Cibotium)
- Dryopteridaceae: Dryopteris

Monocots:

- Asparagaceae/Ruscaceae: Dracaena
- Arecaceae: Coconut palm (Cocos), loulu (Pritchardia)
- Liliaceae: Astelia

Dicots - Caryophyllidae

- Amaranthaceae: Charpentiera
- Nyctaginaceae: catchbird trees (Pisonia)

Dicots - Rosidae

- Celastraceae: Perrottetia
- Cunoniaceae: Weinmannia
- Elaeocarpaceae: Elaeocarpus
- Euphorbiaceae: Aleurites, spurges/ʻakoko (Euphorbia)
- Fabaceae: acacias (Acacia)
- Malvaceae: Hibiscadelphus, Waltheria
- Myrtaceae: Metrosideros, Syzygium
- Phyllanthaceae: Antidesma
- Rutaceae: doughwood/ʻalani (Melicope), prickly-ashes (Zanthoxylum)
- Thymelaeaceae: Wikstroemia
- Urticaceae: Pipturus

Dicots - Asteridae

- Apocynaceae: Alyxia
- Araliaceae: ʻolapa (Cheirodendron), Tetraplasandra
- Asteraceae: silverswords (Argyroxiphium), bur-marigolds/kokoʻolau (Bidens)
- Goodeniaceae: fan-flowers/naupaka (Scaevola)
- Hydrangeaceae: kanawao (Broussaisia)
- Lobeliaceae: lobelias (Lobelia)
- Oleaceae: osmanthuses (Osmanthus)
- Primulaceae: colicwood/kōlea (Myrsine)
- Rubiaceae: Bobea, Coprosma, Gouldia, Psychotria
- Scrophulariaceae: Myoporum

The most commonly recorded hostplants are from the genera Alyxia, Broussaisia, Euphorbia and Psychotria.
