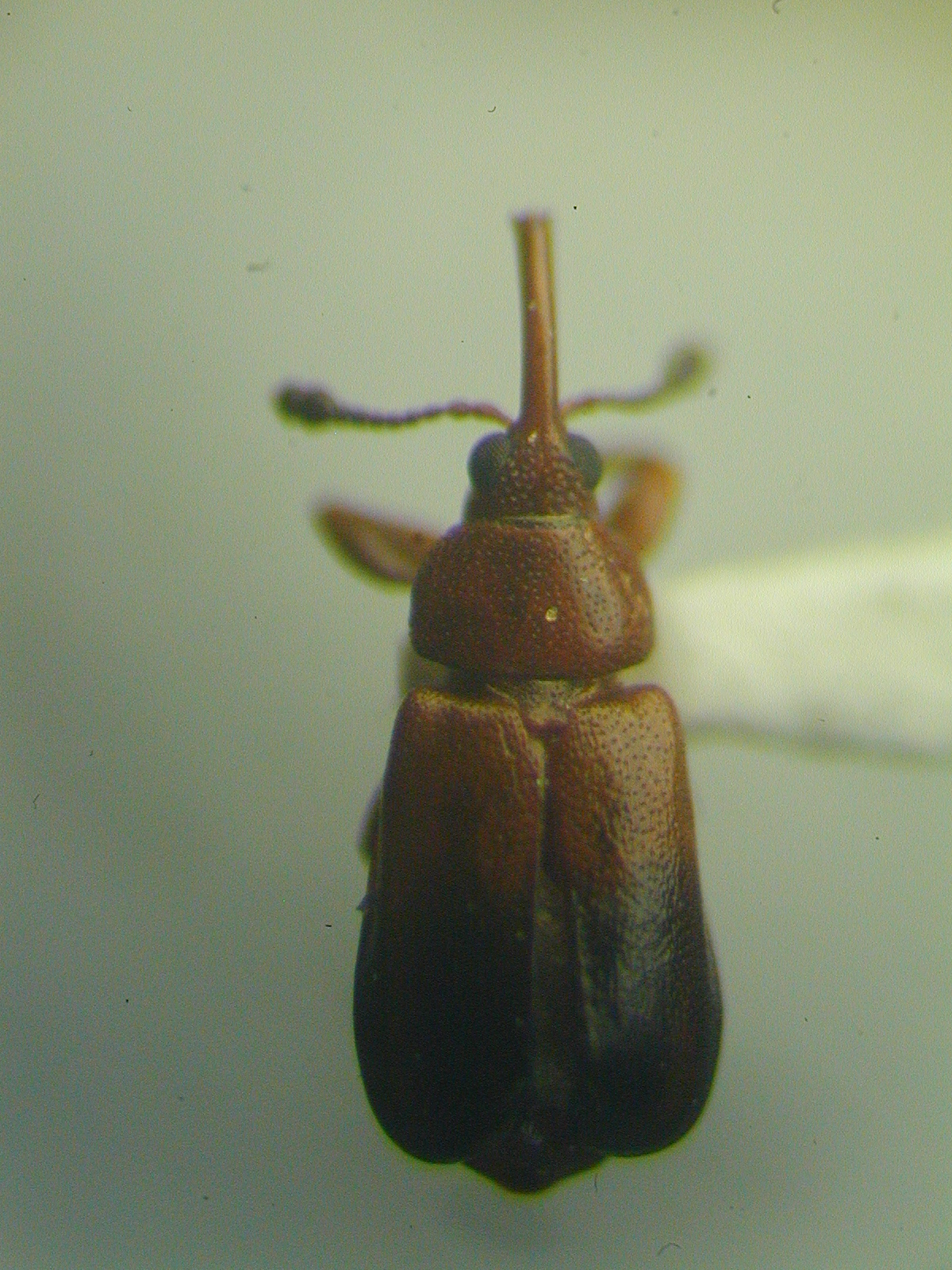
- Rhopalotria dimidiata

Scientific classification
- Kingdom: Animalia
- Phylum: Arthropoda
- Class: Insecta
- Order: Coleoptera
- Suborder: Polyphaga
- Infraorder: Cucujiformia
- Family: Belidae
- Genus: Rhopalotria; Chevrolat, 1878

= Rhopalotria =

Genus of beetles

Rhopalotria is a genus of cycad weevils in the beetle family Belidae. There are about six described species in Rhopalotria.

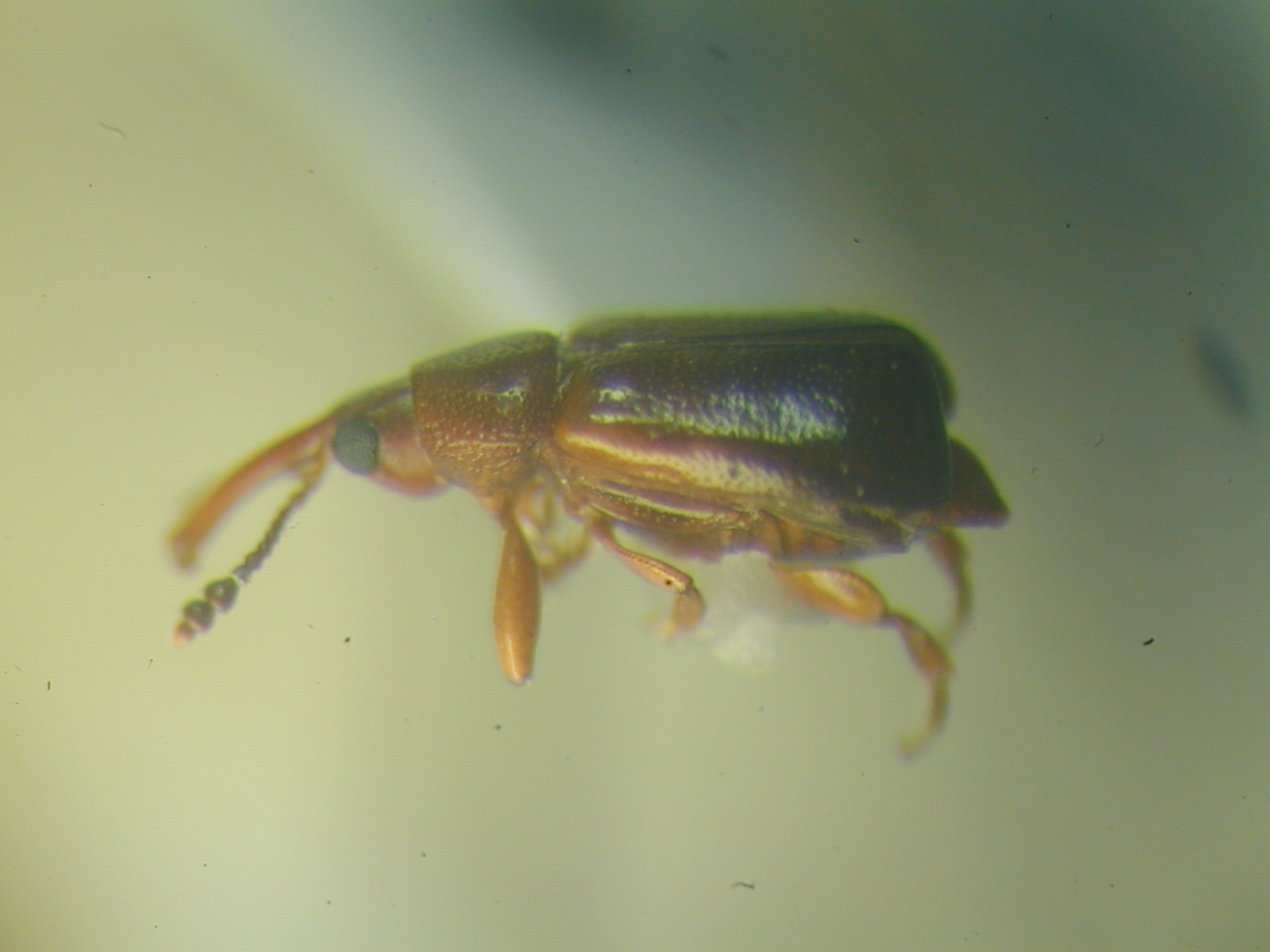
Rhopalotria dimidiata

Species of Rhopalotria are pollinators of various species of Zamia in the Americas.

== Species ==
These six species belong to the genus Rhopalotria:

- Rhopalotria dimidiata Chevrolat, 1878
- Rhopalotria furfuracea O'Brien & Tang, 2015
- Rhopalotria mollis (Sharp, 1890)
- Rhopalotria slossonae (Schaeffer, 1905)
- Rhopalotria slossoni (Schaeffer, 1905)
- Rhopalotria vovidesi O'Brien & Tang, 2015
