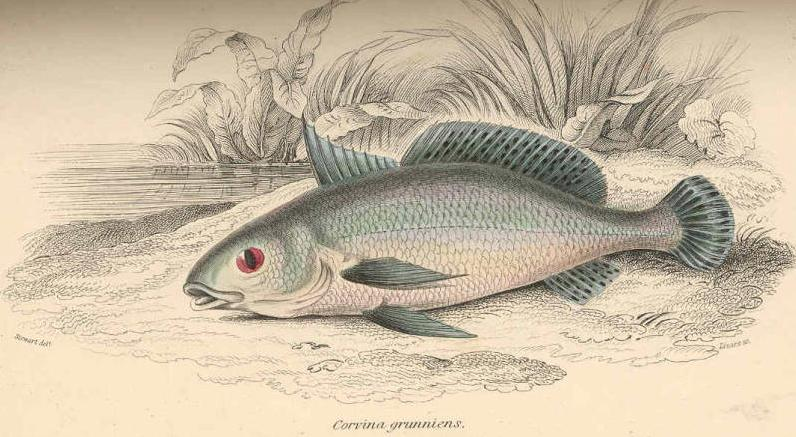

Conservation status
- Data Deficient (IUCN 3.1)

Scientific classification
- Kingdom: Animalia
- Phylum: Chordata
- Class: Actinopterygii
- Order: Acanthuriformes
- Family: Sciaenidae
- Genus: Petilipinnis; Casatti, 2002
- Species: P. grunniens

Binomial name
- Petilipinnis grunniens (Jardine & Schomburgk, 1843)

Synonyms
- Corvina grunniens Jardine & Schomburgk, 1843

= Petilipinnis =

Genus of ray-finned fish

Petilipinnis is a monospecific genus of freshwater ray-finned fish belonging to the family Sciaenidae, the drums and croakers. Its only species is Petilipinnis grunniens, a fish found in the drainage systems of the Amazon, Cuyuni and Essequibo Rivers in Guyana, eastern Venezuela and northern Brazil.
