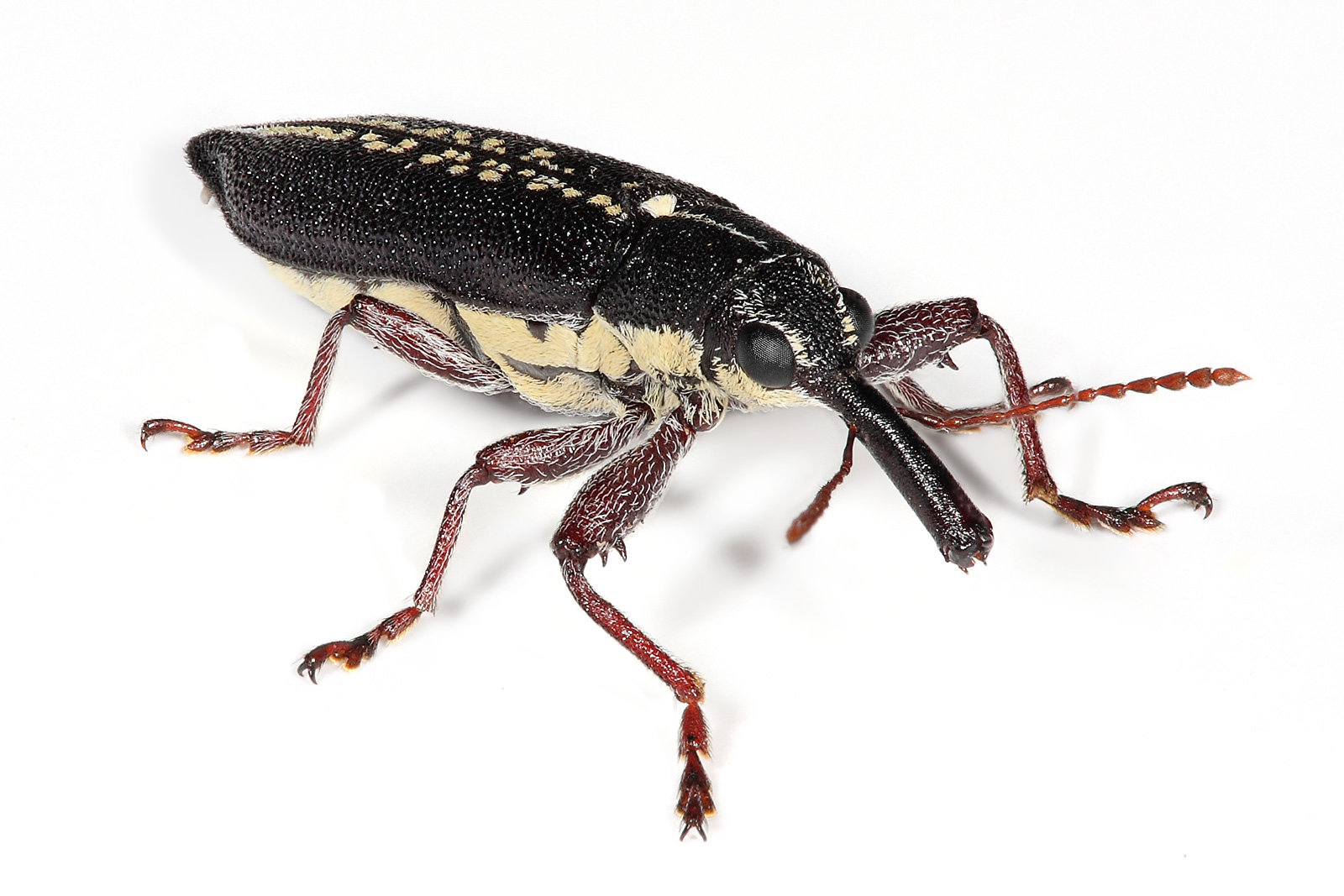
- Rhinotia hemistictus

Scientific classification
- Kingdom: Animalia
- Phylum: Arthropoda
- Clade: Pancrustacea
- Class: Insecta
- Order: Coleoptera
- Suborder: Polyphaga
- Infraorder: Cucujiformia
- Clade: Phytophaga
- Superfamily: Curculionoidea
- Family: Belidae; Schönherr, 1826

Subfamilies
- Belinae; Oxycoryninae and see text

= Belidae =

Belidae Temporal range: Middle Jurassic–Recent

Family of beetles

Belidae is a family of weevils, called belids or primitive weevils because they have straight antennae, unlike the "true weevils" or Curculionidae which have geniculate (elbowed) antennae. They are sometimes known as "cycad weevils", but this properly refers to a few species from the genera Parallocorynus and Rhopalotria.

== Distribution ==
The Belidae today have an essentially Gondwanan distribution, occurring only in the Australia–New Guinea–New Zealand region up to Southeast Asia, South and Central America (barely reaching North America), some Pacific islands (notably the Hawaiian Islands) and a few places in Africa. Many lineages of belids are notable for their highly relictual distribution; for example the Aglycyderini are found in two areas on opposite sides of the Earth, with no such beetles known from anywhere in between.

Belids were more widespread during the Late Jurassic to Early Cretaceous, about 161 to 100 million years ago, when they were found at least in Central Asia, Spain and Brazil. Paleogene species belonging to still-living tribes are known from Europe and North America.

== Description ==
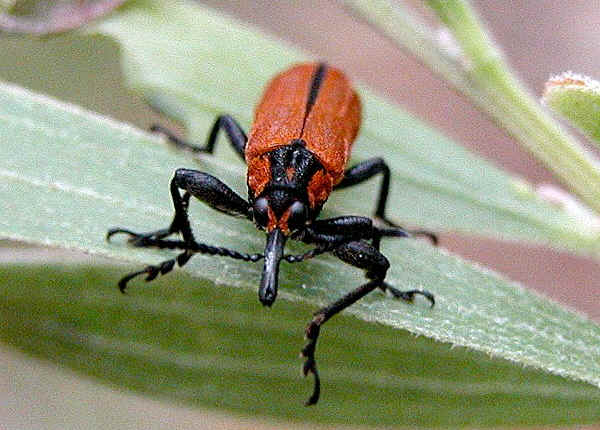
Rhinotia haemoptera resembles a fire-coloured beetle (Pyrochroidae) in colour.

Members of the subfamily Belinae are typically elongated and cylindrical. Some belines resemble other weevils, like the genus Lixus of the true weevil family (Curculionidae), or brentids. Others are mimetic and imitate less closely related Polyphaga beetles such as Lycidae or Pyrochroidae.

The adults are distinguished from other ancient weevil lineages by some characteristic traits: The fore tibia of belines is unusual in that it has a comb of bristles (setae) in an apical groove opposite the tarsal articulation; this is used for grooming. Microscopically, the spermathecal gland is several times longer than the spermathecal capsule. Most also have only a few (four or fewer) setae on each mandible (more in Aglycyderini), and the pronotum is constricted at the tip (not in Oxycorynus, Parallocorynus and Rhopalotria).

The endocarina is V-shaped. In most, the antennae have a retractable membrane at the base (not in Parallocorynus and Rhopalotria), and the alimentary canal has caeca distributed all over at random (in two clean bundles in Aglycyderini and Metrioxenini).

== Ecology ==
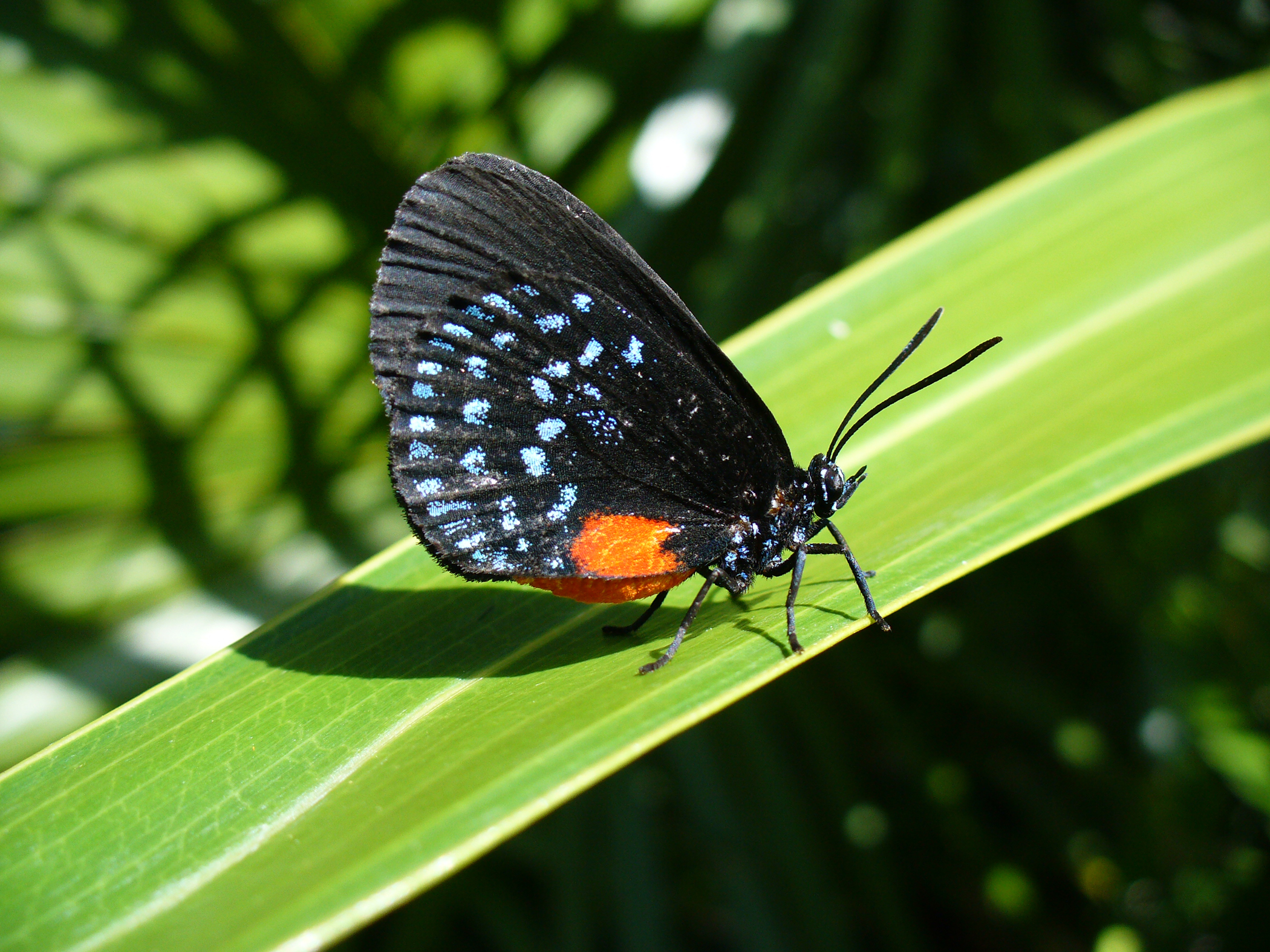
The Atala butterfly (Eumaeus atala) can only survive because the belid Rhopalotria slossoni pollinates its foodplant.

Adults usually eat pollen; the larvae feed on the wood of diseased or dying plants or on deadwood, flower buds or fruits. Though they may appear to be pests because of their association with plants dying off, belids tend to avoid healthy plants. They may occur as a secondary complication in plants already affected by some pest or disease however. But altogether, belids (as opposed to many other weevils) are normally harmless and can be beneficial, the adults as pollinators and the larvae as indicator species for bad condition of their host plants. In Florida for example, Rhopalotria slossoni is important in maintaining populations of the rare Coontie (Zamia pumila); indirectly, the Atala butterfly (Eumaeus atala) also depends on this beetle.

The original host plants of belids were probably Araucariaceae, conifers which were extremely common during the time when the family evolved. Some modern genera also feed on angiosperms, usually rather old groups like Balanophoraceae, Myrtaceae or Vitaceae, on cycads, or on palms. The Pacific genus Proterhinus has undergone a vigorous adaptive radiation on the Hawaiian Islands and evolved to utilize a wide range of the limited diversity of plants found there.

== Systematics ==
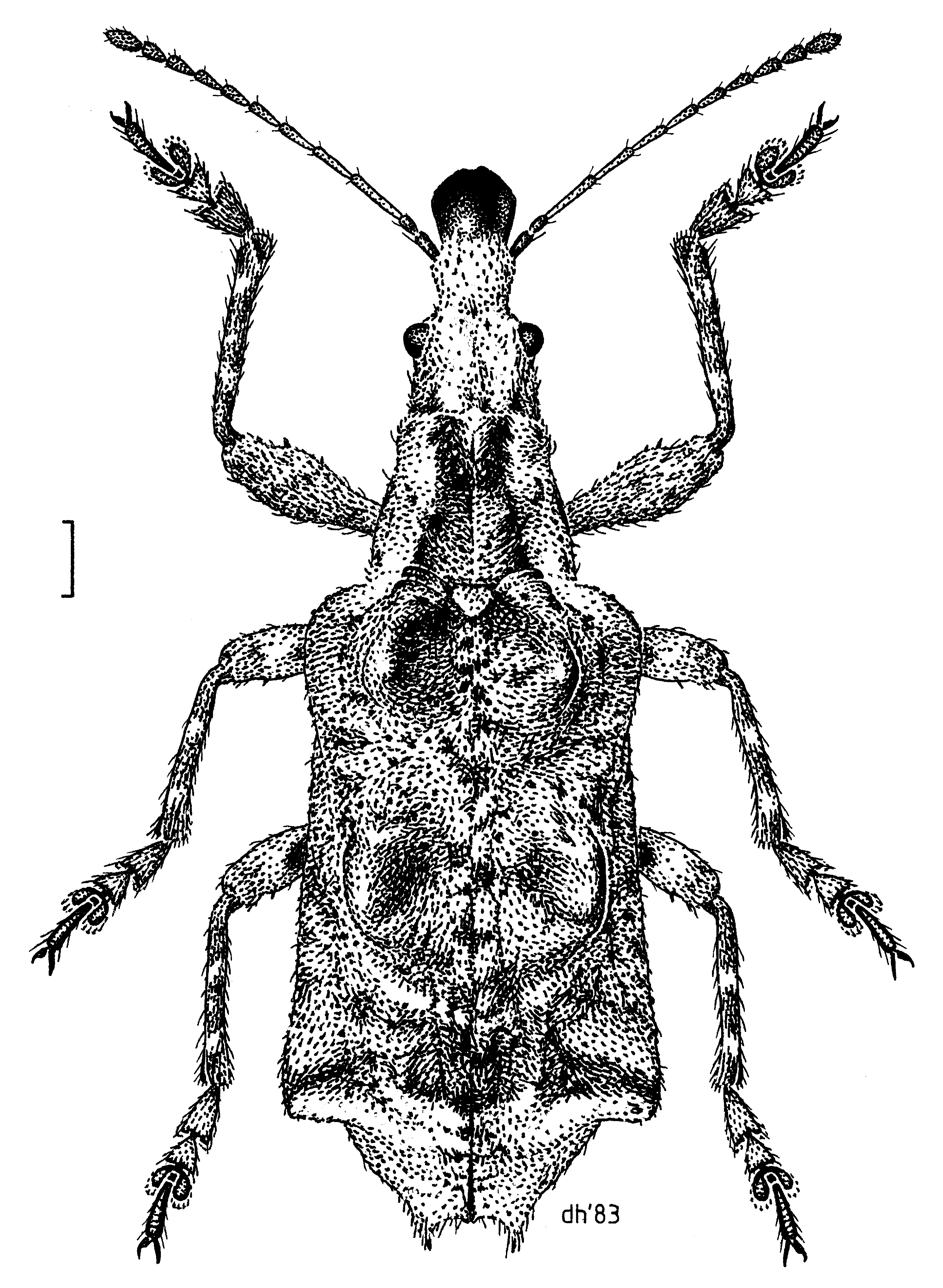
Agathinus tridens

The subfamilies have each, at various times, been considered as separate families, but they are grouped together in most recent classifications. There are three main living lineages, variously considered three or, as here, two subfamilies, with the tribe Aglycyderini sometimes considered a distinct subfamily. Other classifications treat the Oxycoryninae as distinct family Oxycorynidae. A prehistoric subfamily only known from Mesozoic fossils are the Eobelinae.

=== Extinct taxa ===
- †Sinoeuglypheus Yu et al. 2019 Daohugou, China, Callovian
- Subfamily Belinae Schoenherr 1826
  - †tribe Davidibelini Legalov 2015
    - †Davidibelus Zherikhin and Gratshev 2004 Crato Formation, Brazil, Aptian
  - †subfamily Montsecbelinae Legalov 2015
    - †tribe Montsecbelini Legalov 2015
      - †Montsecbelus Zherikhin and Gratshev 1997 La Pedrera de Rúbies Formation, Spain, Barremian
  - Subfamily Oxycoryninae Schoenherr 1840
    - †Khetana Zherikhin 1993 Emanra Formation, Russia, Turonian
    - Clade Aglycyderitae Wollaston 1864
      - †tribe Distenorrhinoidini Legalov 2009
        - †Distenorrhinoides Gratshev and Zherikhin 2000 La Pedrera de Rúbies Formation, Spain, Barremian
    - Clade Allocorynitae Sharp 1890
      - Tribe Allocorynini Sharp 1890
        - †Pleurambus Poinar and Legalov 2014 Dominican amber, Miocene
      - †tribe Palaeorhopalotriini Legalov 2013
        - †Palaeorhopalotria Legalov 2013 Monteils Formation, France, Priabonian
    - Clade Oxycorynitae Schoenherr 1840
      - Tribe Metrioxenini Voss 1953
        - Subtribe Metrioxenina Voss 1953
          - †Archimetrioxena Voss 1953 Baltic amber, Eocene
        - Subtribe Zherichinixenina Legalov 2009
          - †Paltorhynchus Scudder 1893 Green River Formation, Florissant Formation, United States, Eocene
          - †Succinometrioxena Legalov 2012 Baltic amber, Eocene
