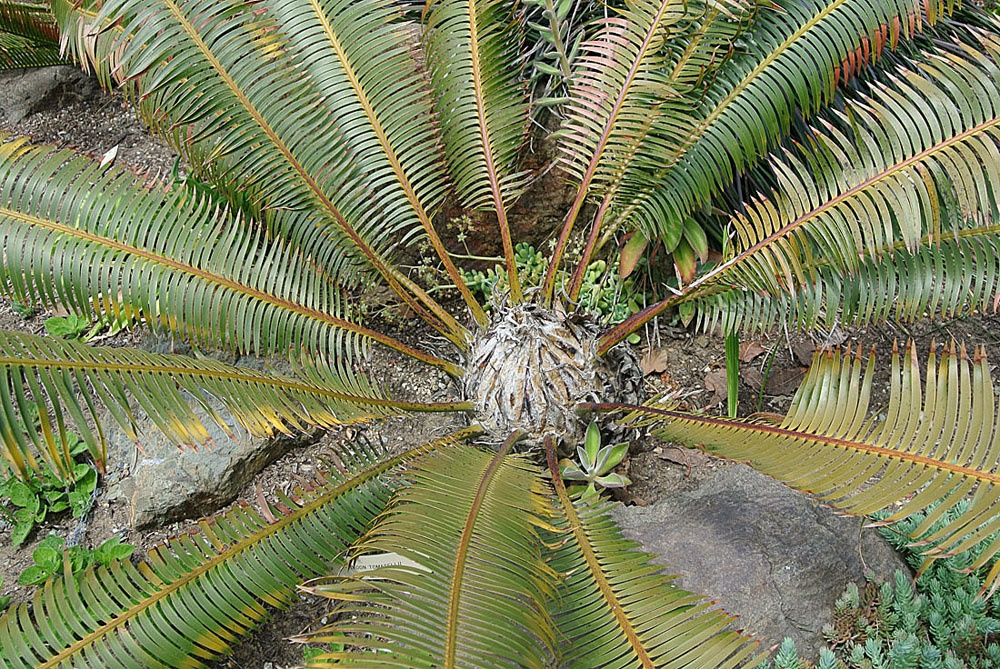

Conservation status
- Vulnerable (IUCN 3.1)

Scientific classification
- Kingdom: Plantae
- Clade: Embryophytes
- Clade: Tracheophytes
- Clade: Spermatophytes
- Clade: Gymnospermae
- Division: Cycadophyta
- Class: Cycadopsida
- Order: Cycadales
- Family: Zamiaceae
- Genus: Dioon
- Species: D. tomasellii

Binomial name
- Dioon tomasellii De Luca, Sabato & Vázq.Torres

= Dioon tomasellii =

Species of cycad

Dioon tomasellii is a species of cycad in the family Zamiaceae. It is endemic to Mexico, where it occurs in the states of Durango, Guerrero, Jalisco, Michoacán, and Nayarit.

This plant grows in oak and pine-oak forest and woodland habitat. Threats to the species include destruction of the habitat for agriculture and overcollection for horticultural purposes.

This species was first described in 1984. It was revised in 1997, with one variety being elevated to species status as Dioon sonorense.

== Mutualism ==
The beetle Pharaxonotha novoia is in an obligatory mutualistic relationship with Dioon tomaselli, living and breeding in male cones and consuming pollen and cone tissues while serving as a pollinating vector by transferring pollen to female cones.

== Gallery ==
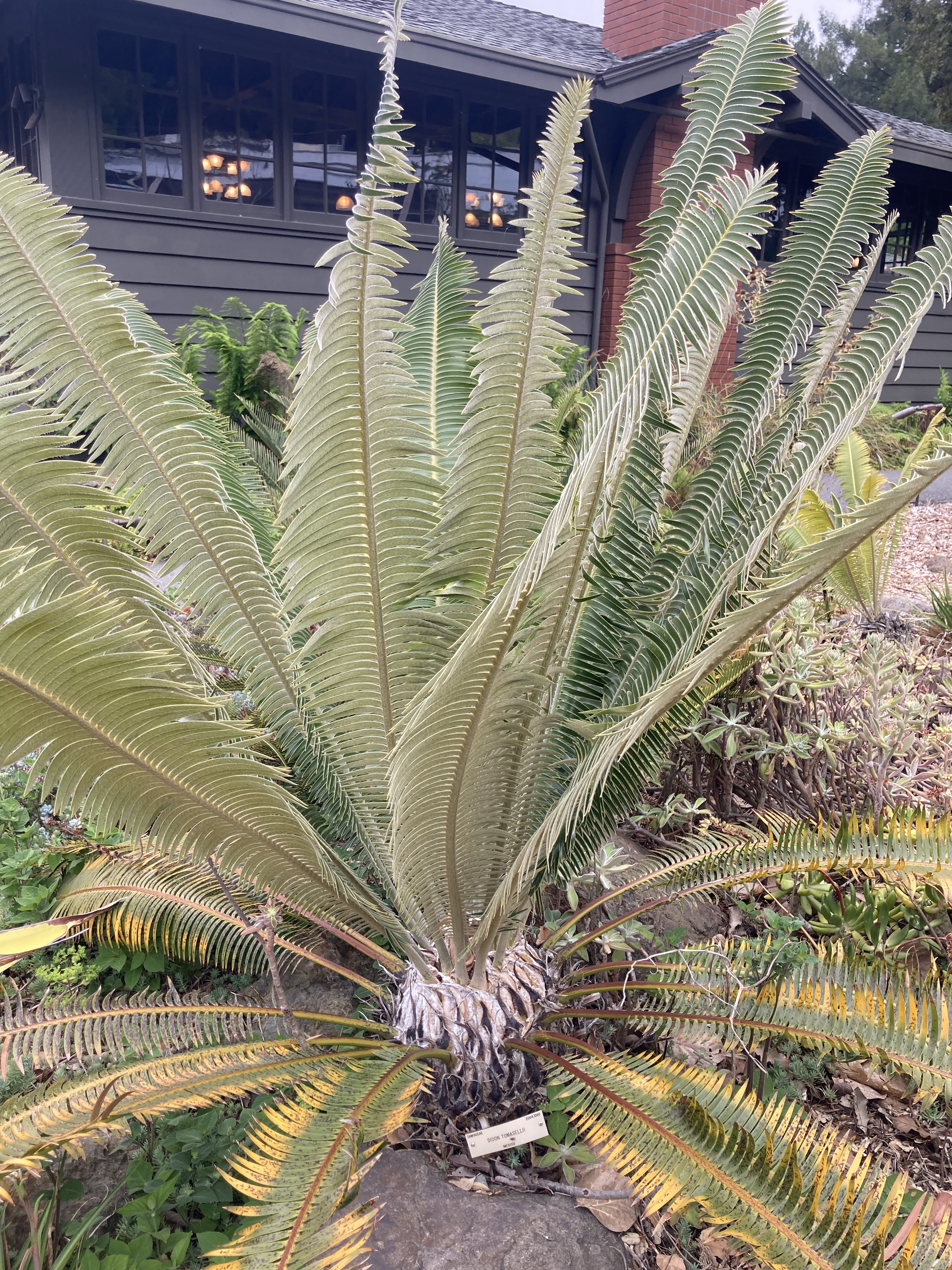
A specimen at UC Berkeley Botanic Garden

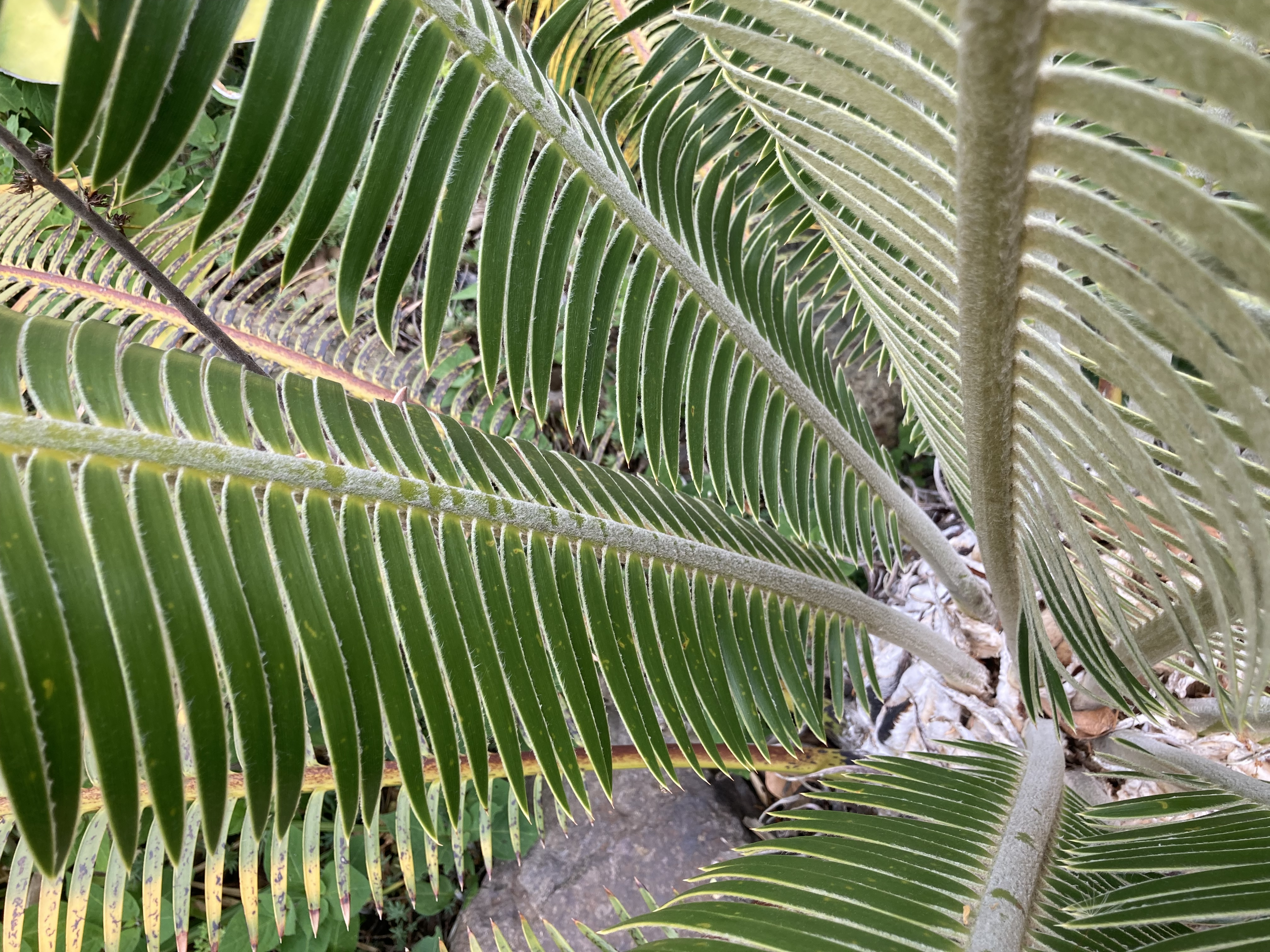
Detail of the leaves, the back showing off characteristic tomentum

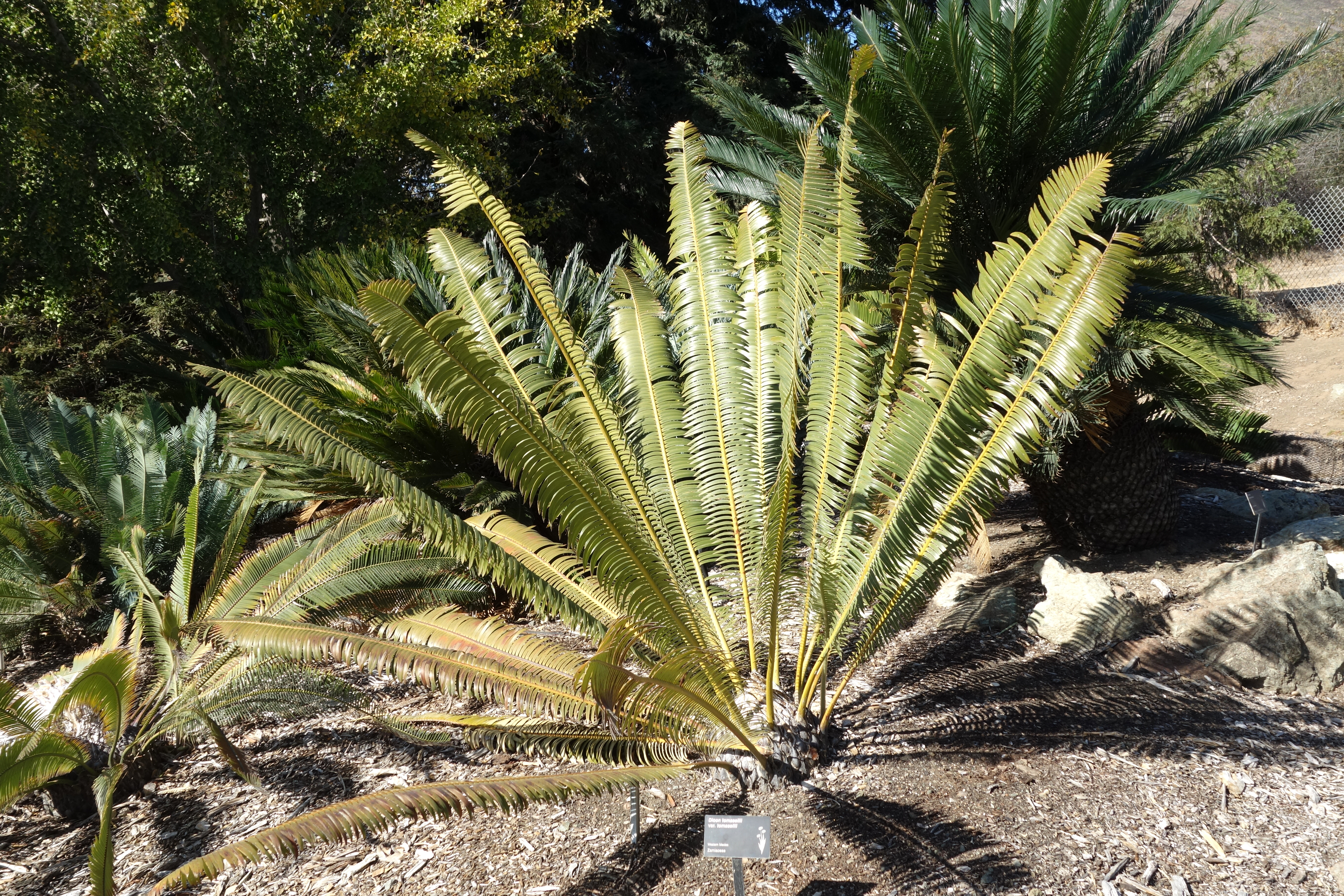
A specimen in San Luis Obispo
