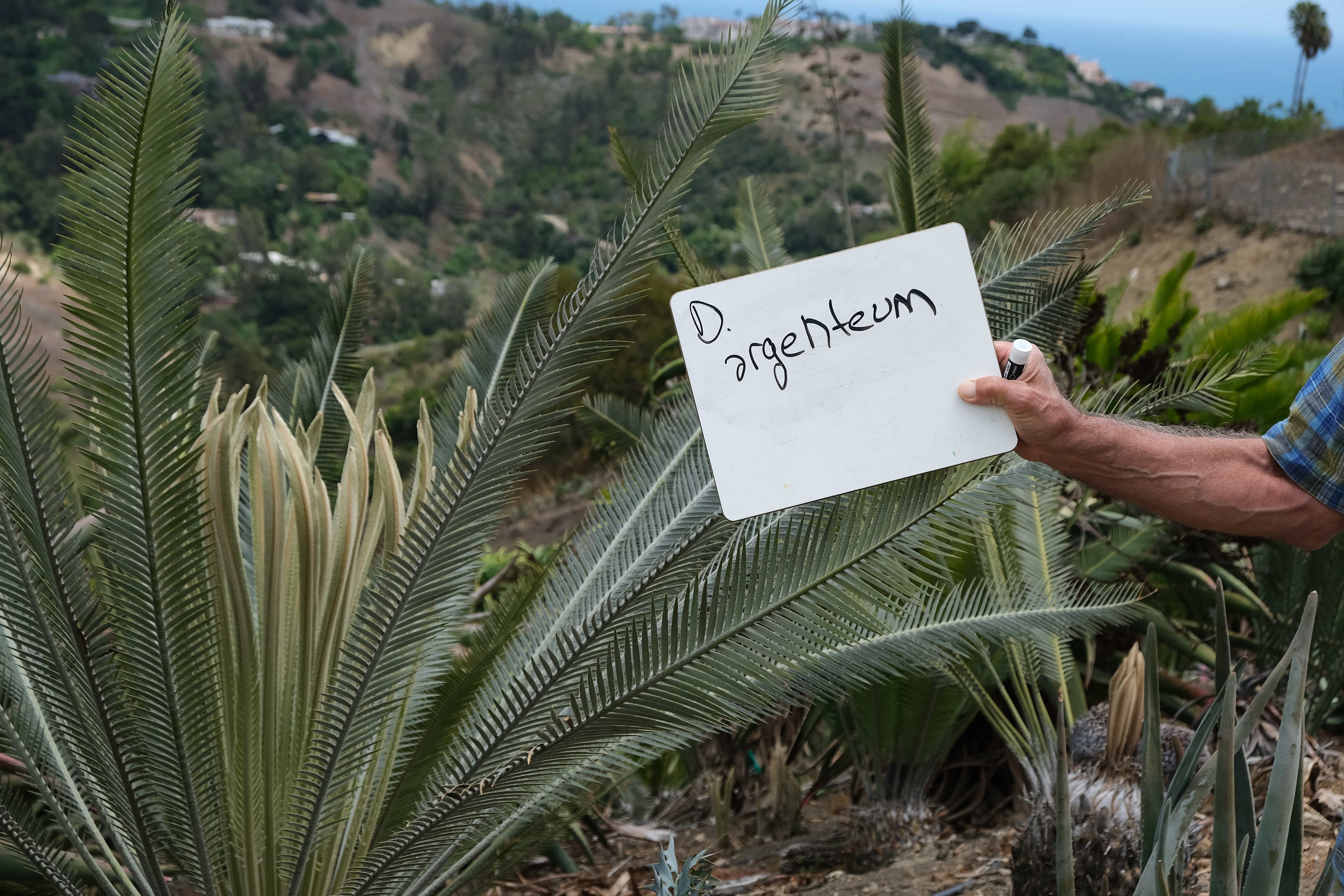
- Soft leaves emerge in the middle of the previous years growth

Conservation status
- Vulnerable (IUCN 3.1)

Scientific classification
- Kingdom: Plantae
- Clade: Tracheophytes
- Clade: Gymnospermae
- Division: Cycadophyta
- Class: Cycadopsida
- Order: Cycadales
- Family: Zamiaceae
- Genus: Dioon
- Species: D. argenteum

Binomial name
- Dioon argenteum T.J.Gregory, J.Chemnick, S.Salas-Morales & Vovides

= Dioon argenteum =

Species of cycad

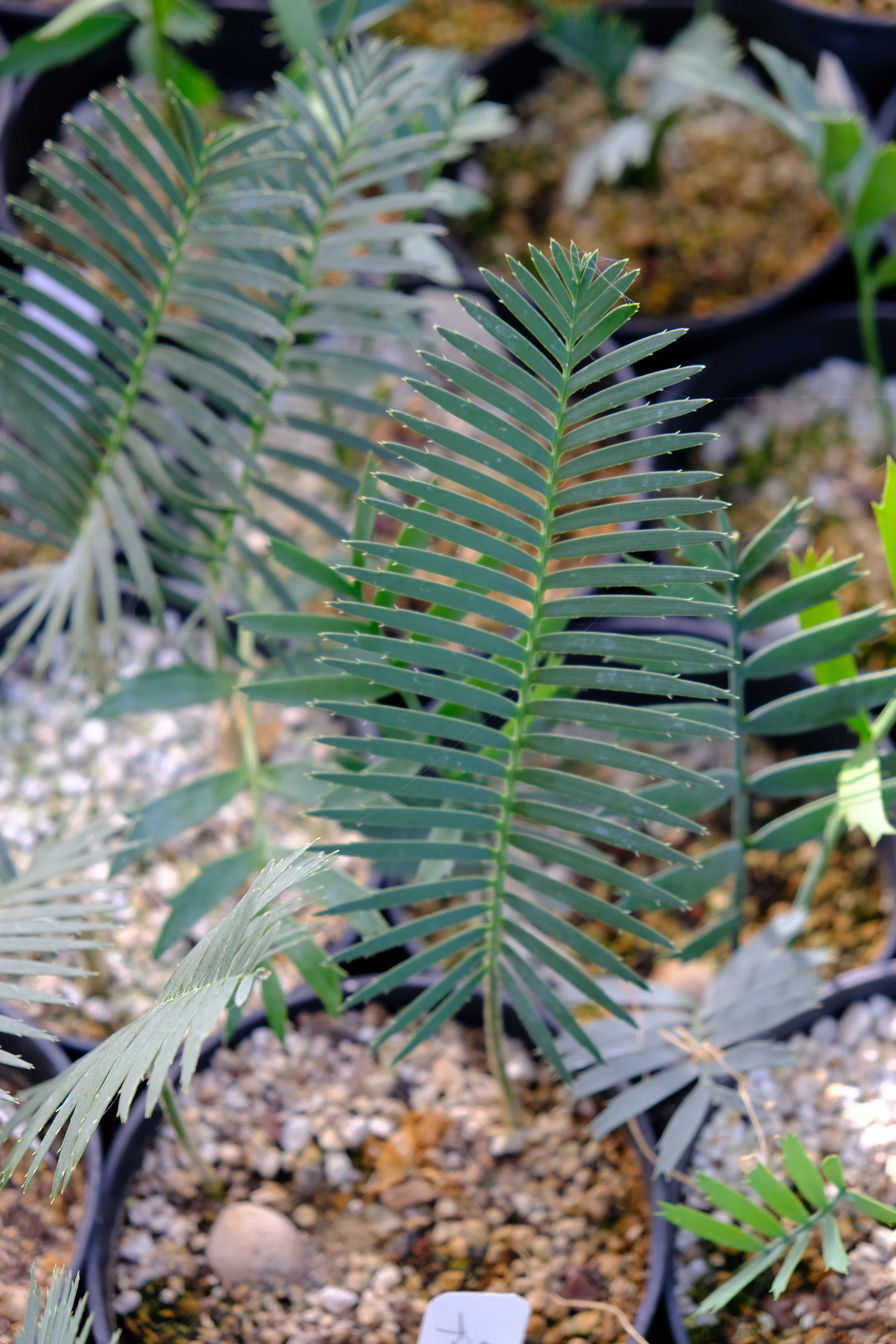
Seedling in 1 gallon pot

Dioon argenteum is a species of cycad native to northern Oaxaca, Mexico. It is one of a number of Mexican cycads described by Tim Gregory, S. Salas-Morales, and Jeff Chemnick, including Dioon planifolium.
