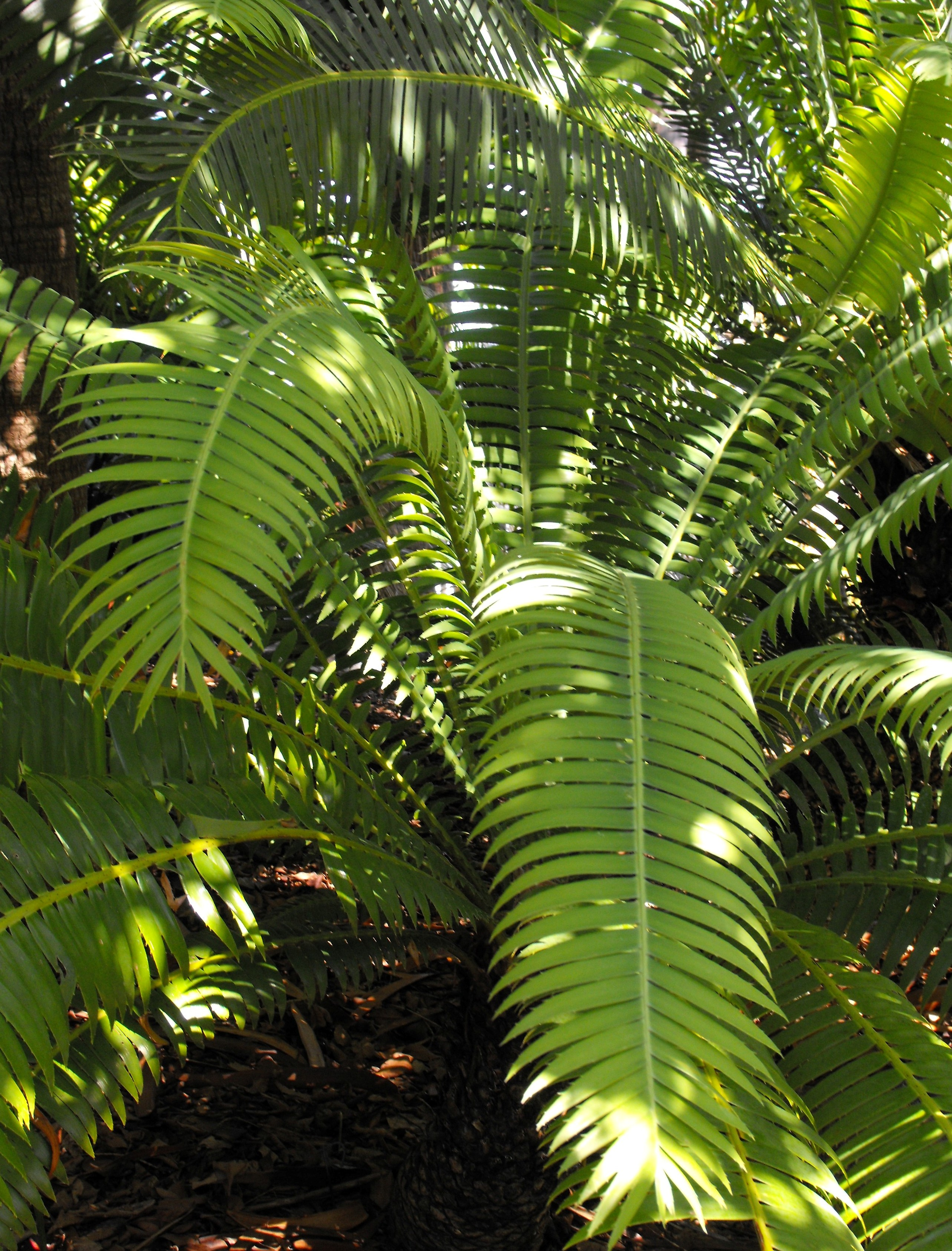

Conservation status
- Endangered (IUCN 3.1)

Scientific classification
- Kingdom: Plantae
- Clade: Tracheophytes
- Clade: Gymnospermae
- Division: Cycadophyta
- Class: Cycadopsida
- Order: Cycadales
- Family: Zamiaceae
- Genus: Dioon
- Species: D. holmgrenii

Binomial name
- Dioon holmgrenii De Luca, Sabato & Vázq. Torres 1981

= Dioon holmgrenii =

Species of cycad

Dioon holmgrenii is a species of cycad in the family Zamiaceae. It is endemic to Mexico, where it occurs only in an area just to the southwest of San Gabriel Mixtepec, Oaxaca. It is known by the common name palma del sol (sun palm).

This plant grows in humid pine-oak forest habitats.

There are only two known subpopulations.

== Mutualism ==
The beetle Pharaxonotha occidentalis is in an obligatory mutualistic relationship with Dioon holmgrenii, living and breeding in male cones and consuming pollen and cone tissues while serving as a pollinating vector by transferring pollen to female cones.
