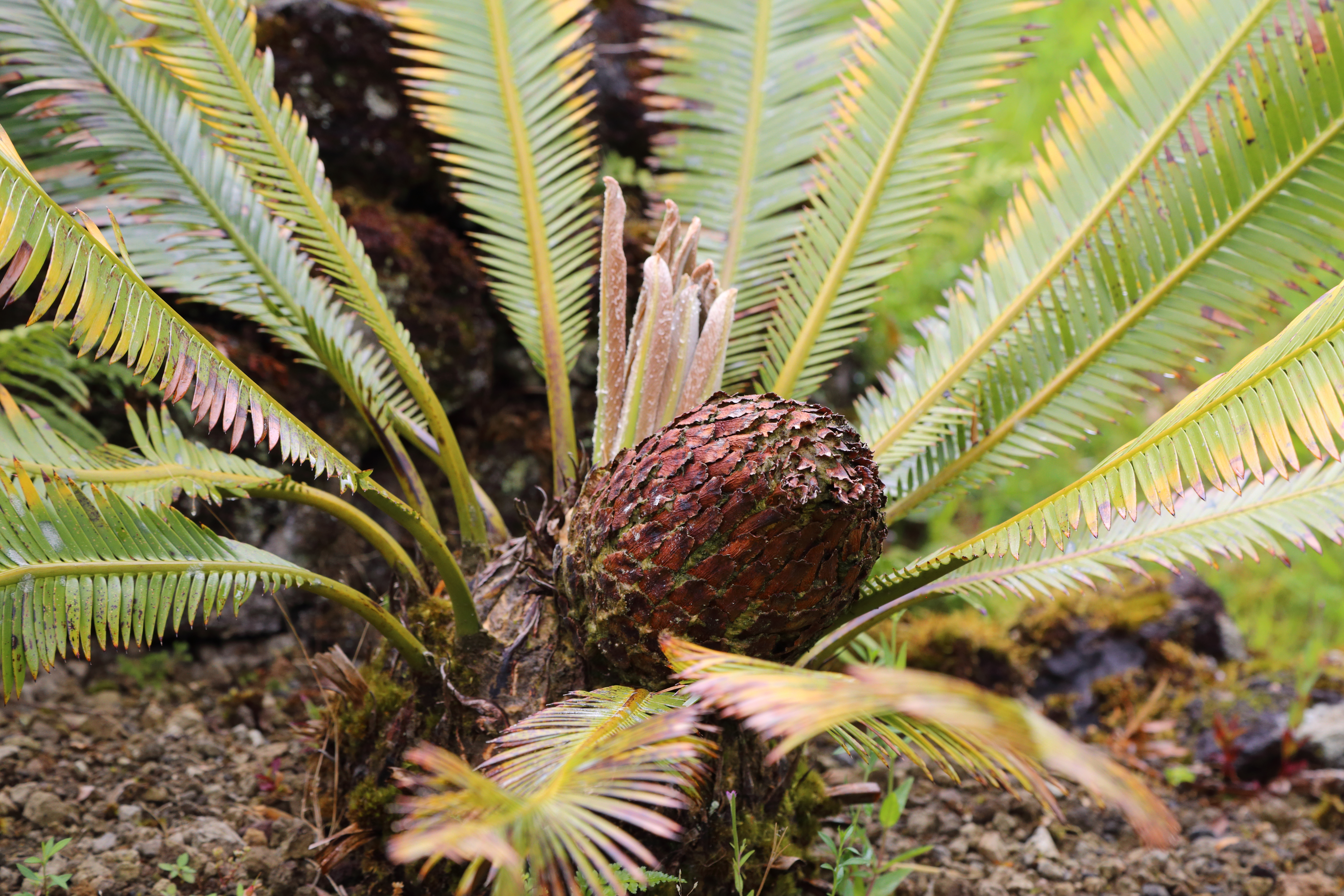

Conservation status
- Near Threatened (IUCN 3.1)

Scientific classification
- Kingdom: Plantae
- Clade: Tracheophytes
- Clade: Gymnospermae
- Division: Cycadophyta
- Class: Cycadopsida
- Order: Cycadales
- Family: Zamiaceae
- Genus: Dioon
- Species: D. edule

Binomial name
- Dioon edule Lindl.

Synonyms
- Dioon aculeatum; Dioon imbricatum; Dioon strobilaceum; Dioon strobilosum; Macrozamia littoralis; Macrozamia pectinata; Platyzamia rigida; Zamia maeleni

= Dioon edule =

Chestnut dioon

Species of cycad

Dioon edule, the chestnut dioon, is a cycad native to Mexico, also known as palma de la virgen. Cycads are among the oldest seed plants and even pre-date the dinosaurs. It belongs to the Zamiaceae plant family within the order Cycadales. The genus name "Dioon" means "two-egged", referring to the two ovules (see photo below).

Two subspecies are known, the nominate subspecies growing in a moister environment than the other:

- Dioon edule subsp. angustifolium
- Dioon edule subsp. edule

== Anatomy ==
Dioon edule is easily distinguished from other Dioon species because it lacks spines on the borders of leaflets. Spines are present on juvenile leaves but are lost when the plant matures. D. edule has a crown of pinnate (i.e. feathered) leaves which measure around 135 cm long. Lateral budding is present and mucilage, or sap, is excreted from any cut surfaces on the plant body. The plant has a large central medulla and a single vascular bundle containing the xylem, phloem and cambium. Since the organism is slow-growing and xerophilous (i.e. drought-tolerant), only a small conduction channel is needed, unlike other plants. Stomata are also present to aid in transpiration and assimilation and are associated with sporophylls. D. edule has three or four large adventitious (i.e. abnormally positioned) roots surrounded by many smaller ones which harbor small nodules containing tannins. Roots are composed of large amounts of corky secondary tissue consisting of phellogen. It is often very difficult distinguish males and females until they develop a cone. Cones generally do not show a visual difference; however, cone intervals can be used to determine the sex of the plant. Females usually have a much longer cone interval than males, typically 10–52 years as compared to 2.8–8.8 years. In the female cone, the central cell of the archegonium (which becomes the seed after pollination) is up to one-eighth inch (3 millimeters) in length and contains a nucleus up to one-fiftieth inch (0.5 mm) in diameter; The largest mononucleate cell known.

== Habitat ==
Dioon edule is endemic to the eastern coast of Mexico. It is commonly found distributed throughout the Sierra Madre Oriental from Veracruz to the Nuevo Leon. It commonly resides in tropical deciduous thorn forests and oak woodlands. They are usually found at an altitude of 500–1000 feet in harsh areas including exposed, shallow soils. Most of the areas in which D. edule resides are subjected to very dry climates and frequent brush fires which impact their survival and distribution.

== Ecology and distribution ==
Disturbances alter the population dynamics of Dioon edule populations. If a population is heavily dominated by adult plants, the disturbance will be minimal as compared to the population consisting of younger plants. This is due to their ability to survive harsh conditions. D. edule exemplifies a Type III survivorship curve and clumped distributions. It is found mostly on shallow, rocky soils due to competition with other, faster growing species for water, nutrients and seed dispersal. In response, they have developed a selective advantage for growing in these harsh climates including vigorous tap roots for anchorage and water conduction. Furthermore, it is harder for rodents to reach the plant and seeds if they are established in difficult locations to reach. In addition to competition, causal agents of D. edule's random, clumped distribution include predation, variations in temperature and precipitation, and measures of seed dispersal.

Death rates among seedlings are considerable, which is detrimental to a slow-growing plant such as the Dioon edule. Seeds must combat harsh, dry climates and frequent bushfires. Most mature plants are heavily armored and able to withstand these fires. Smaller seeds and juvenile plants are not so fortunate. However, the release of nutrients and minerals encourages females to develop cones during the following season. In addition to climate, seeds must also avert rodent predators. This is reasonably unusual because cycad seeds and foliage are poisonous to most mammals, excluding these varied species of rodents. Young leaves of D. edule are also eaten by the Eumaeus debora butterfly larvae.

One of the ways in which cycads are identified includes leaflet characteristics, which were not heavily studied when cycads were first identified. In subsequent studies it was found that leaflet width was related to geographic dispersal. Wider leaves typical of Dioon edule subsp. edule are found in the south whereas the narrower leaves of D. edule subsp. angustifolium are found to the north. Evidence suggests D. edule subsp. edule was much more widespread than it is today and became fragmented thus allowing for genetic isolation. It is also speculated that the narrower leaves are endemic in the northern subspecies due to less temperate and humid environmental conditions in these areas.

In addition, endomycorrhizae are present in roots and allow for increased absorption of nutrients and water. Symbiotic blue-green algae are also found in the coralloid (i.e. upward growing) roots. They assist the plant by fixing nitrogen thus giving the plant essential nutrients in exchange for protection. Cycads in general have significant roles in the nitrogen budget of their respective ecosystems.

== Mutualism ==
The beetles Pharaxonotha dimorpha and Pharaonotha vovidesi are in obligatory mutualistic relationships with Dioon edule, living and breeding in male cones and consuming pollen and cone tissues while serving as pollinating vectors by transferring pollen to female cones.

== Endangerment ==
Both subspecies of Dioon edule are on the verge of becoming endangered. They are threatened by human-caused habitat destruction and collection for horticultural and medicinal purposes. Bouncing back from these disturbances is extremely difficult for slow-growing plants such as D. edule. The United States Botanical Garden suggests that plant material should be conserved, seed banks should be established and legislation regarding trading cycads and protection of their habitats should be implemented and enforced.

== Dioon edule var. edule ==
Dioon edule var. edule is commonly called the chestnut dioon and is endemic to the eastern coast of Mexico. D. edule was originally described by John Lindley in 1843. There are currently two subspecies known: D. edule subsp. edule and D. edule subsp. angustifolium.

== Pictures ==
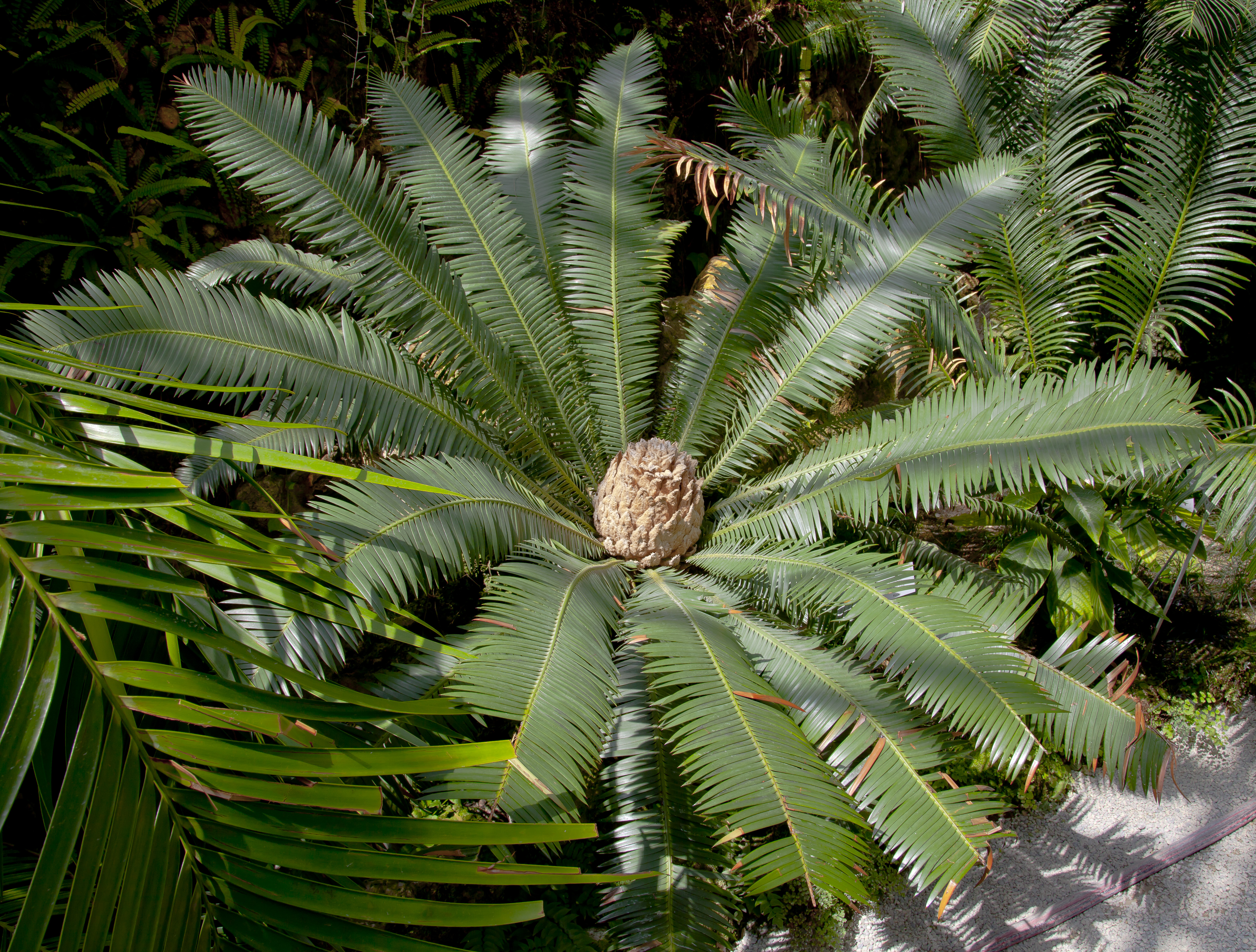
At the Munich Botanical Garden.

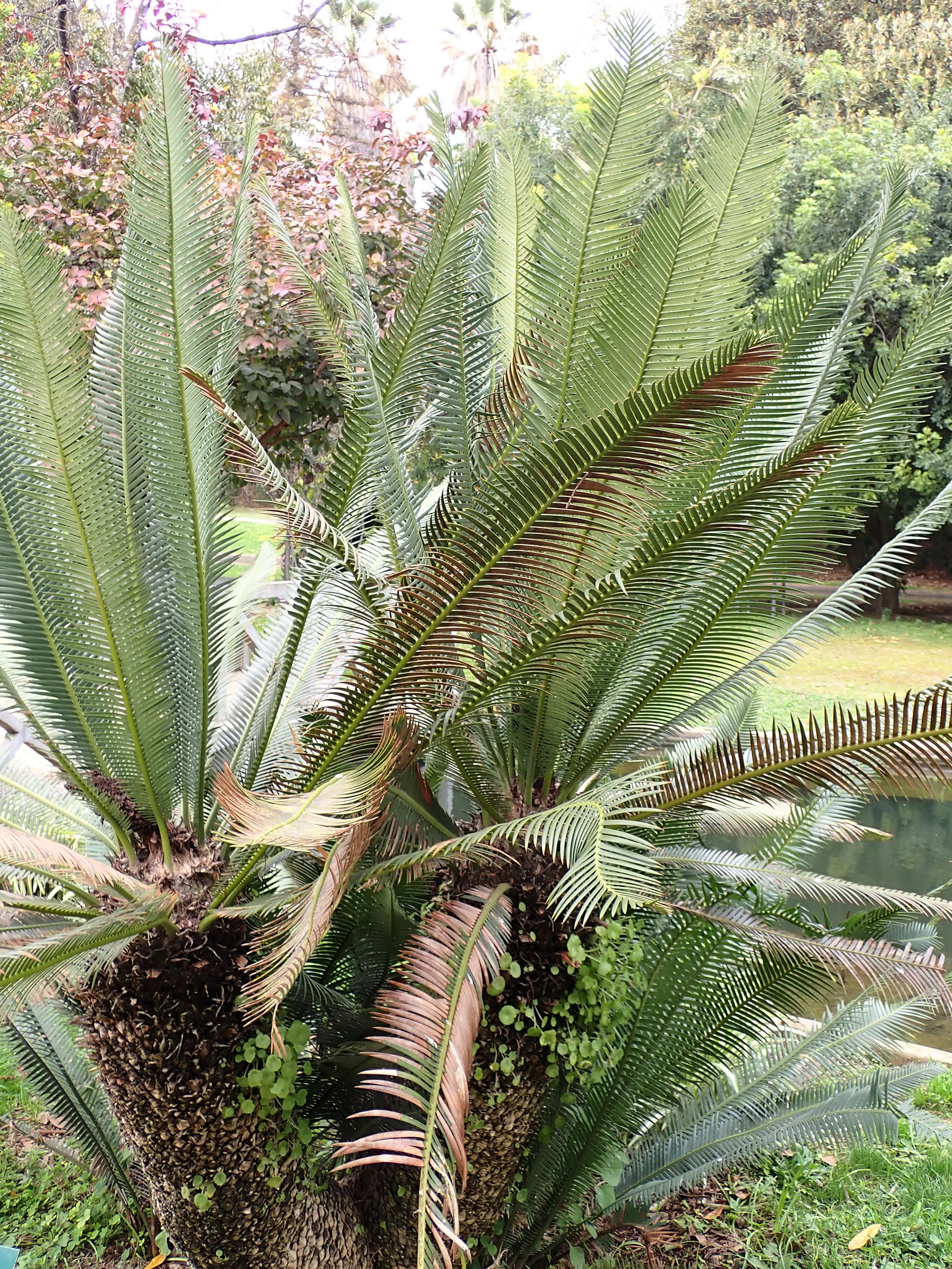
Multi-stemmed plant

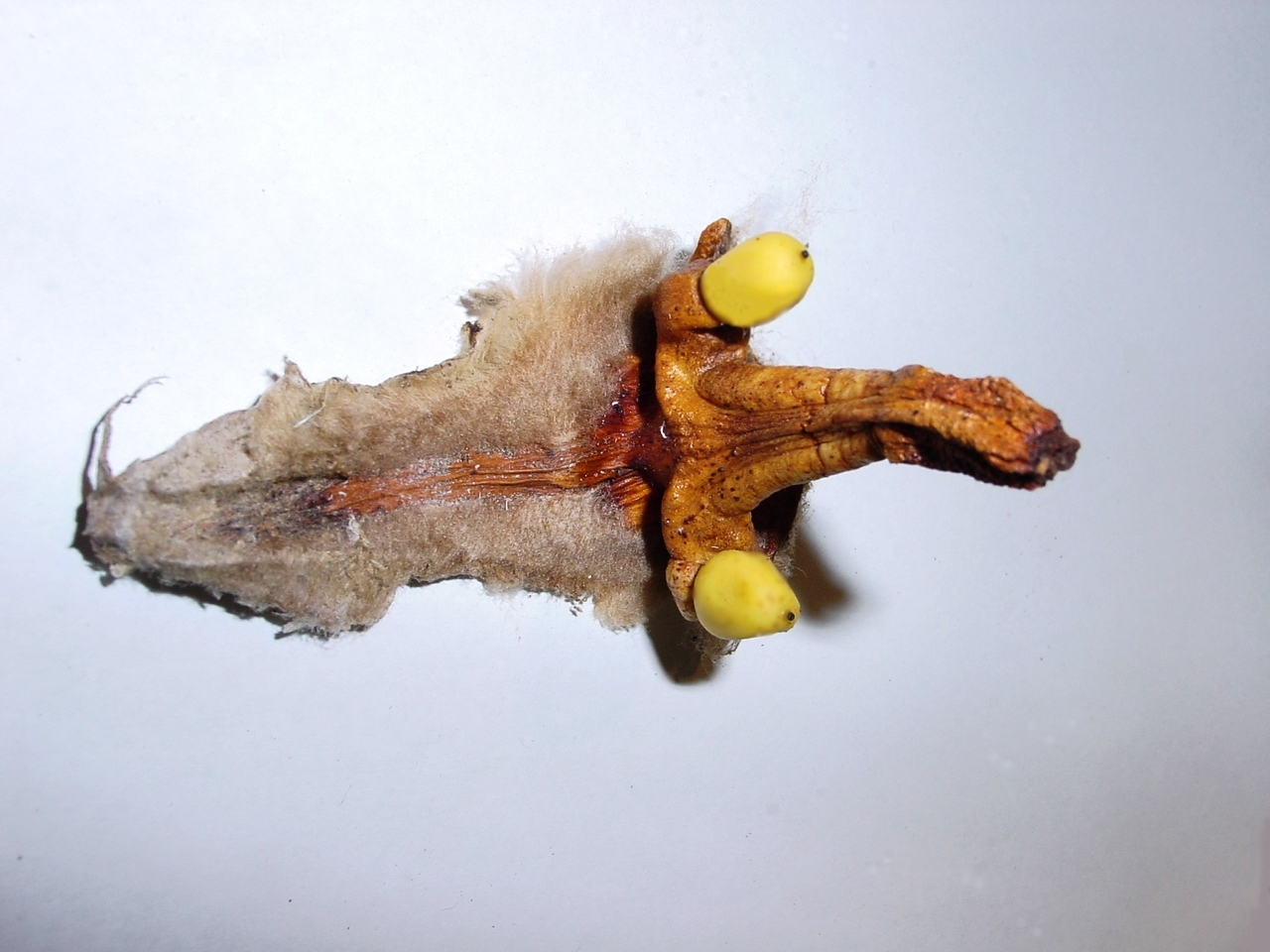
Cone scale with ovules, ''Dioon'' means "two-egged"

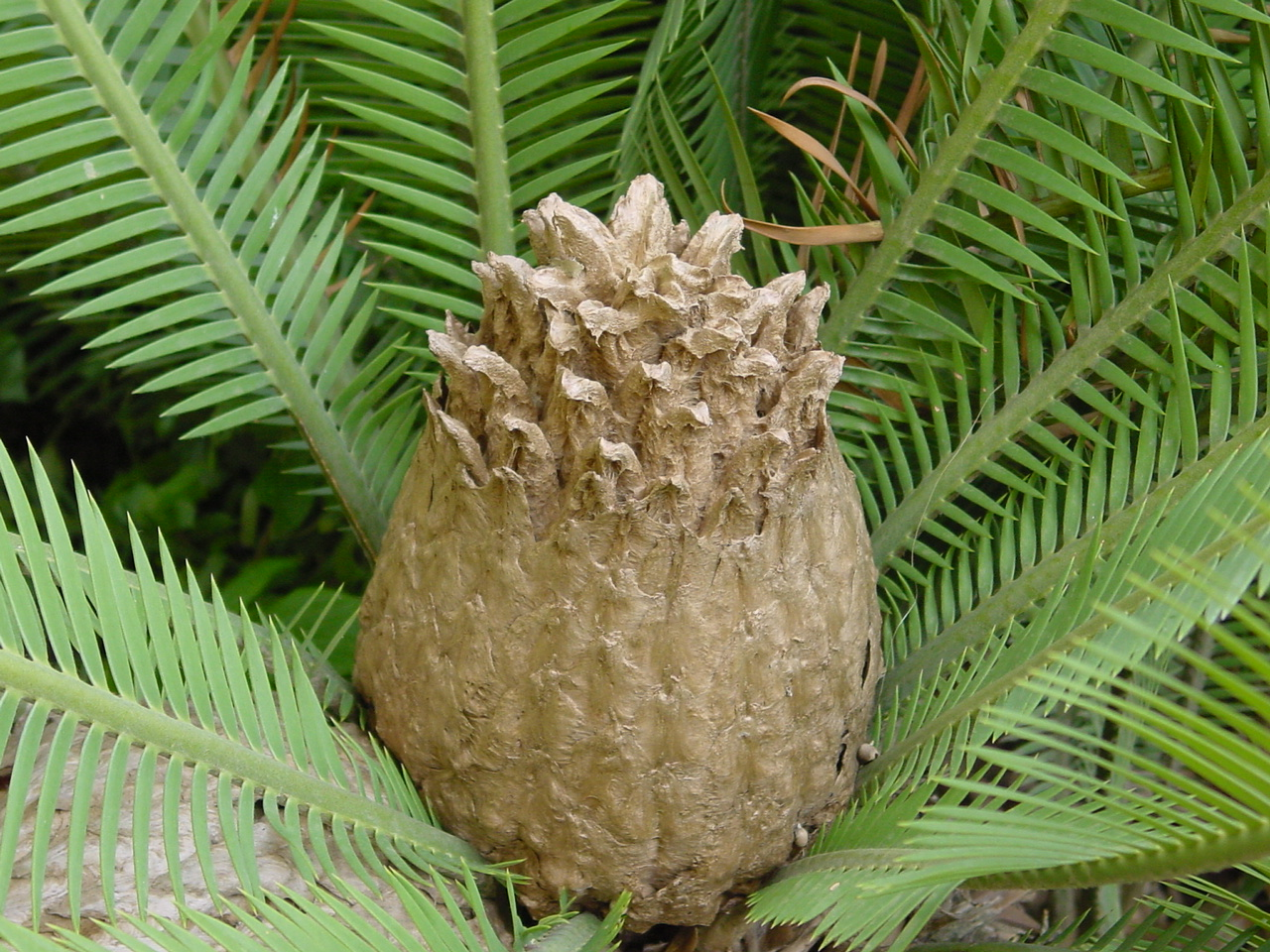
The cone

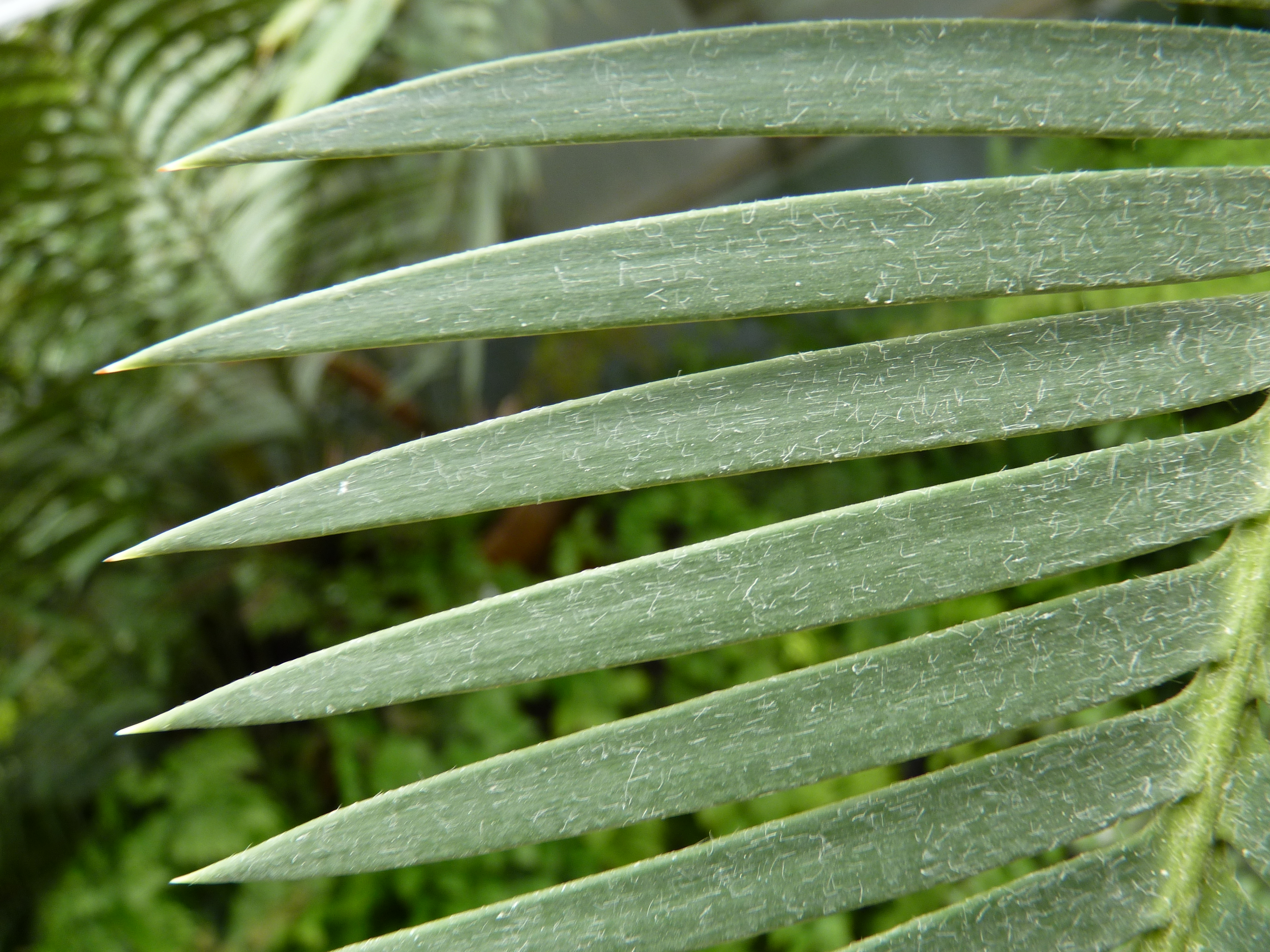
Foliage detail

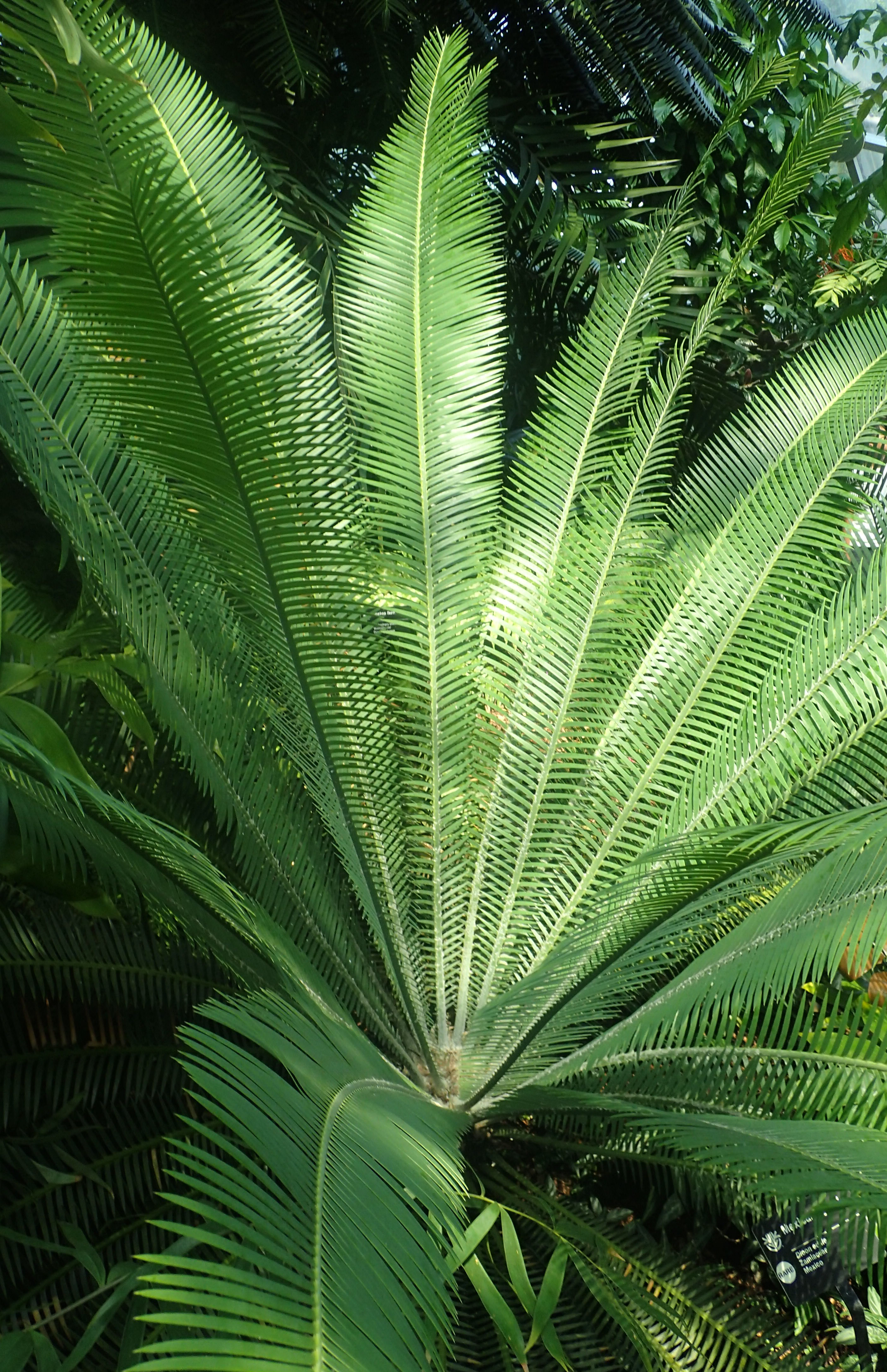
The whole plant

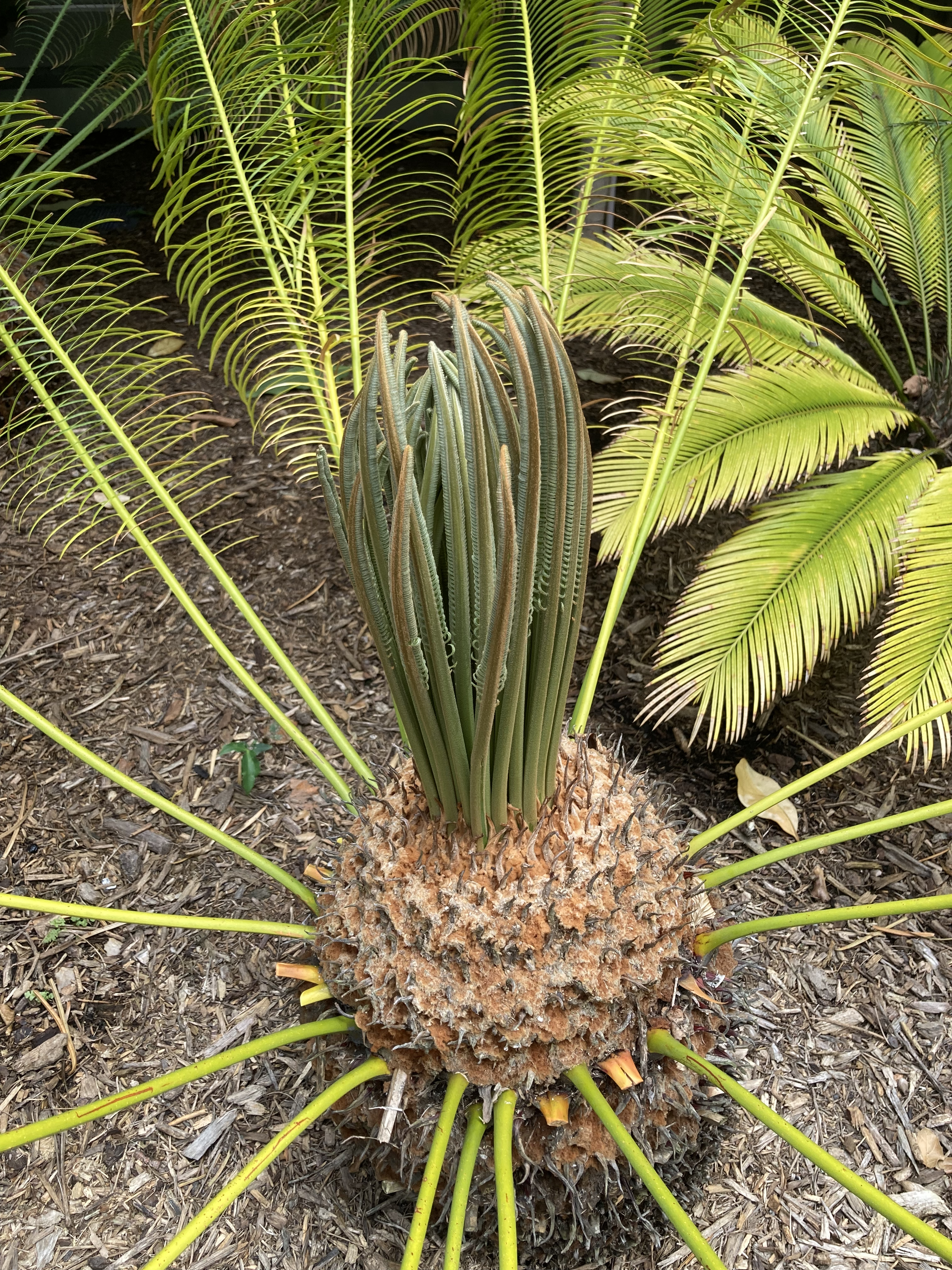
New leaves growing at the Salesforce Transit Center

== References and external links ==
- Stevenson, D. W., R. Osborne & J. Hendricks. A world list of cycads Memoirs of the New York Botanical Garden 57: 200-206 (1990)
- The Cycad Pages: Dioon edule
- Dioon edule original description by J. Lindley (1843).
- Chemnick, J.; Gregory, T. (2010). "Dioon edule". IUCN Red List of Threatened Species. 2010 e.T42158A10643785. doi:10.2305/IUCN.UK.2010-3.RLTS.T42158A10643785.en.
- Compton, R. H, and F. W. South . "Notes From the Cambridge Botany School on the Anatomy of the Dioon Edule Lindle.." New Phytologist 7(1908): 222-229.
- de Luca, Paolo, Sergio Sabato, and Mario Vasquez. "Distribution and Variation of the Dioon Edule." Brittonia 34(1982): 355-362.
- Octavio-Aguilar, Pablo, Jorge Gonzalez-Astorgas, and Andrew P. Vovides. "Population Dynamics of the Mexican Cycad Dioon Edule Lindl. (Zamiaceae) Life History Stages and Management Need." Botanical Journal of the Linnean Society 157(2008): 381-391.
- "Rare and Endangered Plants." 2008. United States Botanical Garden. 2 May 2009
- Vovides, Andrew P. "Spatial Distribution, Survival and Fecundity of the Dioon edule (Zamiaceae) in Tropical Deciduous Forests in Velacruz, Mexico with Notes on its Habitat." The American Journal of Botany 77(1990): !532-1543.
- Whitelock, Loran M. "Variation in the Mexican Cycad Dioon Edule (Zamiaceae)." The Botanical Review 70(240-249): 2009.
