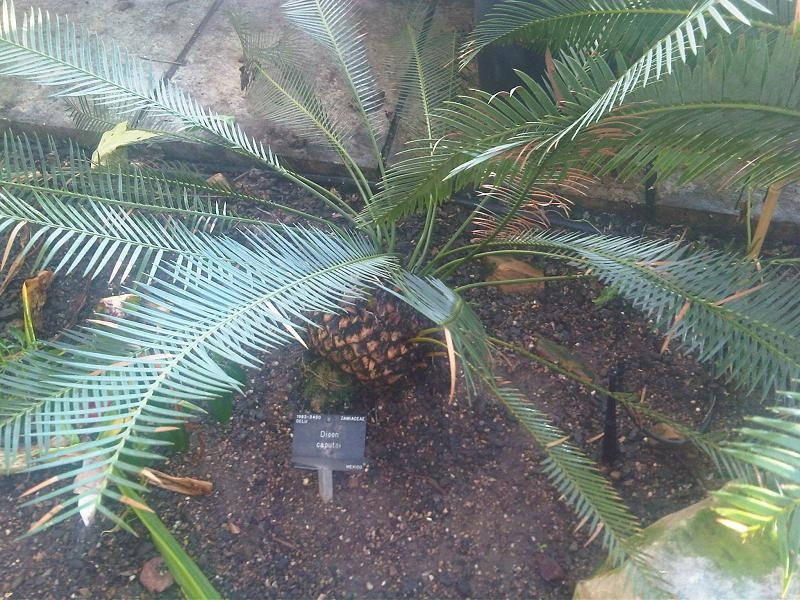

Conservation status
- Endangered (IUCN 3.1)

Scientific classification
- Kingdom: Plantae
- Clade: Tracheophytes
- Clade: Gymnospermae
- Division: Cycadophyta
- Class: Cycadopsida
- Order: Cycadales
- Family: Zamiaceae
- Genus: Dioon
- Species: D. caputoi

Binomial name
- Dioon caputoi De Luca, Sabato & Vázq.Torres

Synonyms
- Dioon edule var. caputoi (De Luca, Sabato & Vázq. Torres) Nance

= Dioon caputoi =

Species of cycad

Dioon caputoi is a species of cycad that is native to the state of Puebla, Mexico. It is found near Loma de la Grana, located 6 km southwest of San Luis Atolotitlán (formerly San Luis Tultitlanapa), Caltepec. It is protected by the Tehuacán-Cuicatlán Biosphere Reserve. As of 2018, there are only five or six known populations of Dioon caputoi remaining in the wild. Within each population are between 50 and 120, primarily adult, specimens that are distributed randomly throughout the dry scrubland. The total mature population now stands at an estimated 2,000 to 2,500 individuals.

== Mutualism ==
The beetle Pharaxonotha bicolor is in an obligatory mutualistic relationship with Dioon caputoi, living and breeding in male cones and consuming pollen and cone tissues while serving as a pollinating vector by transferring pollen to female cones.
