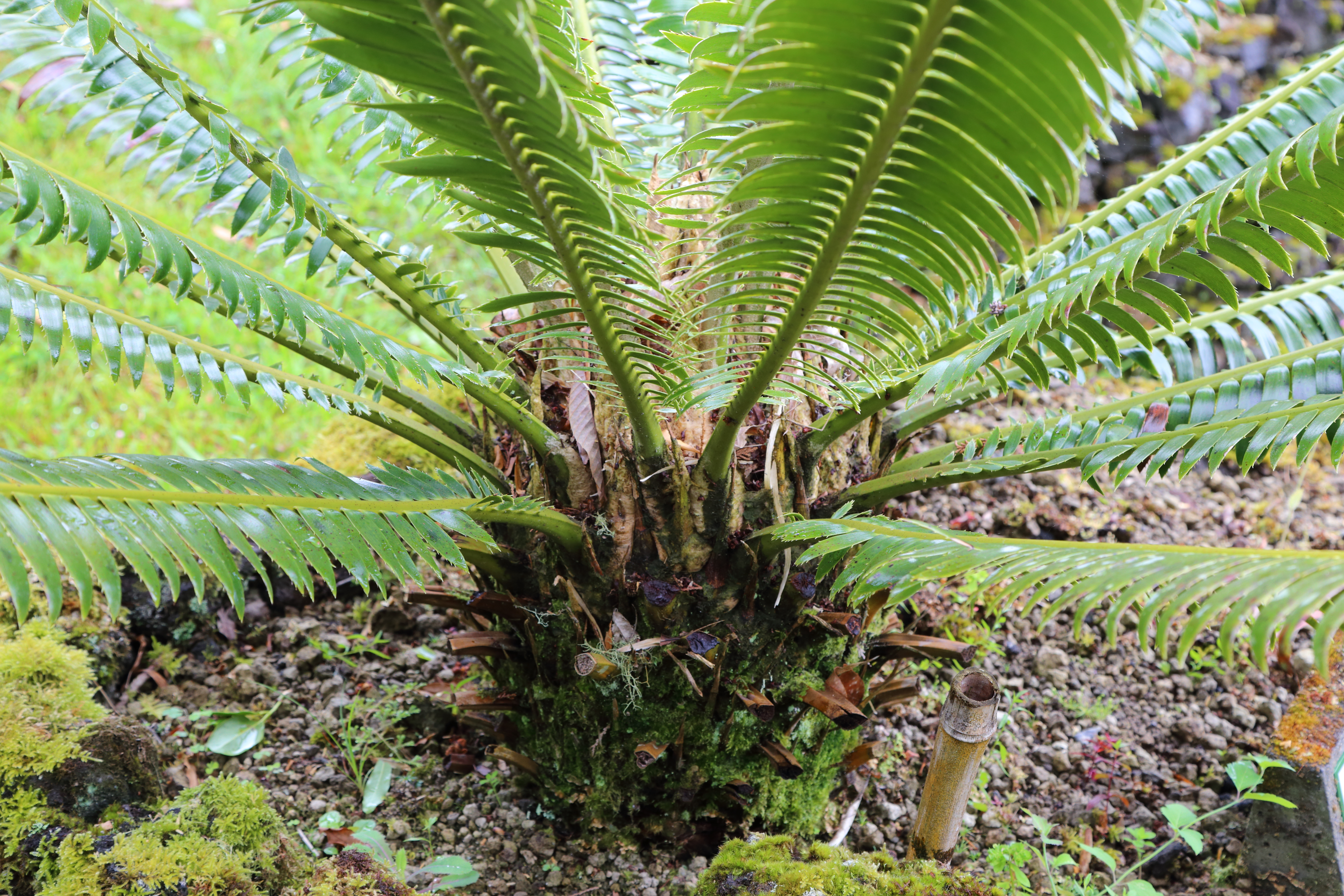

Conservation status
- Endangered (IUCN 3.1)

Scientific classification
- Kingdom: Plantae
- Clade: Tracheophytes
- Clade: Gymnospermae
- Division: Cycadophyta
- Class: Cycadopsida
- Order: Cycadales
- Family: Zamiaceae
- Genus: Dioon
- Species: D. rzedowskii

Binomial name
- Dioon rzedowskii De Luca, A. Moretti, Sabato & Vázq. Torres 1980

= Dioon rzedowskii =

Species of cycad

Dioon rzedowskii is a species of cycad that is endemic to Oaxaca, Mexico. It occurs in the Rio Santo Domingo valley, near the villages of San Bartolomé Ayautla and San Pedro Teutila.
