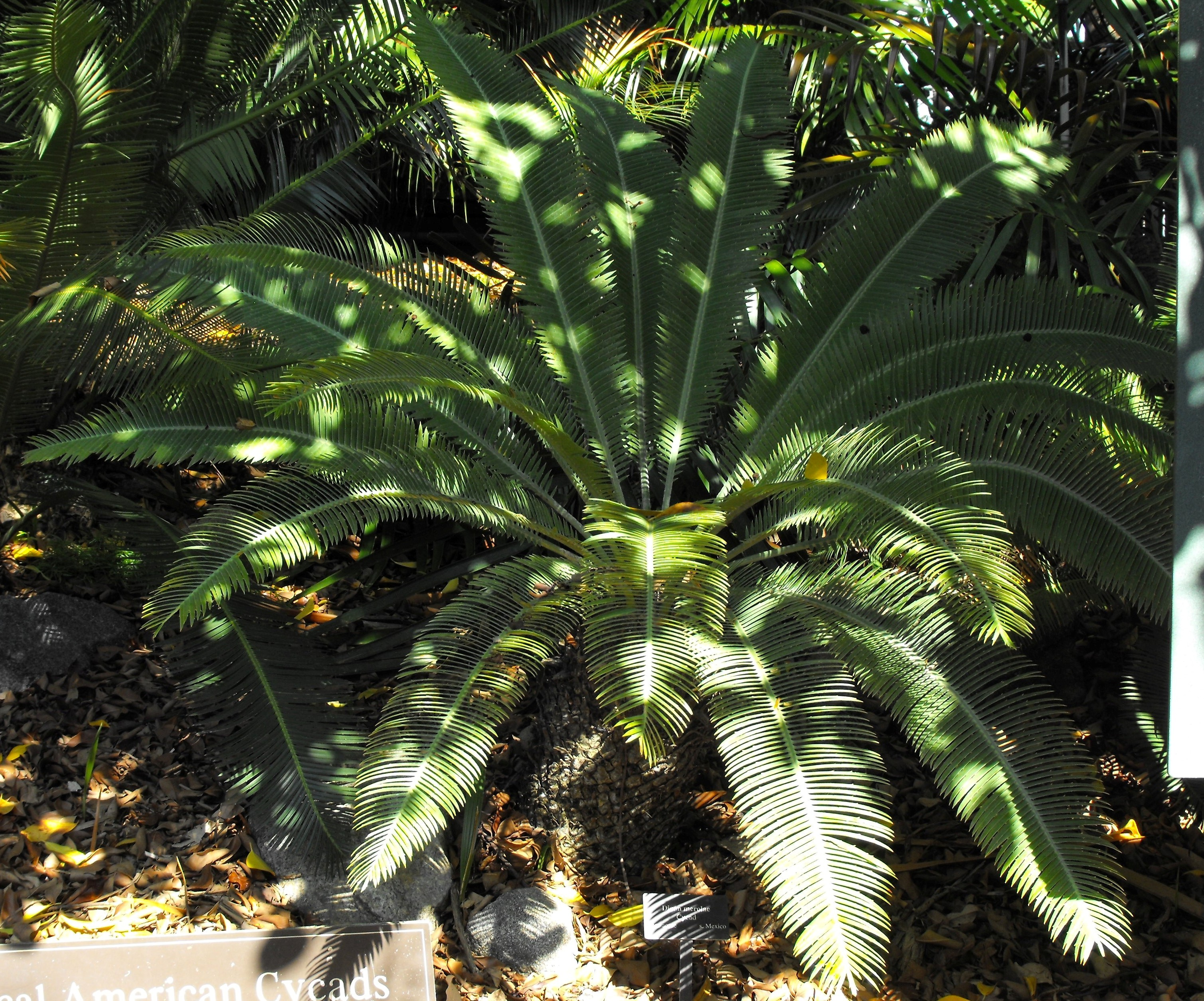

Conservation status
- Vulnerable (IUCN 3.1)

Scientific classification
- Kingdom: Plantae
- Clade: Tracheophytes
- Clade: Gymnospermae
- Division: Cycadophyta
- Class: Cycadopsida
- Order: Cycadales
- Family: Zamiaceae
- Genus: Dioon
- Species: D. merolae

Binomial name
- Dioon merolae De Luca, Sabato & Vázq. Torres 1981

Synonyms
- Dioon edule var. merolae (De Luca & Sabato) Nance 2009

= Dioon merolae =

Species of cycad

Dioon merolae is a species of cycad that is native to Chiapas and Oaxaca, Mexico. It is known from the municipalities of Cintalapa and Villaflores in Chiapas, and from the Sierra Juárez, Oaxaca.

== Mutualism ==
The beetle Pharaxonotha occidentalis is in an obligatory mutualistic relationship with Dioon merolae, living and breeding in male cones and consuming pollen and cone tissues while serving as a pollinating vector by transferring pollen to female cones.

== Gallery ==
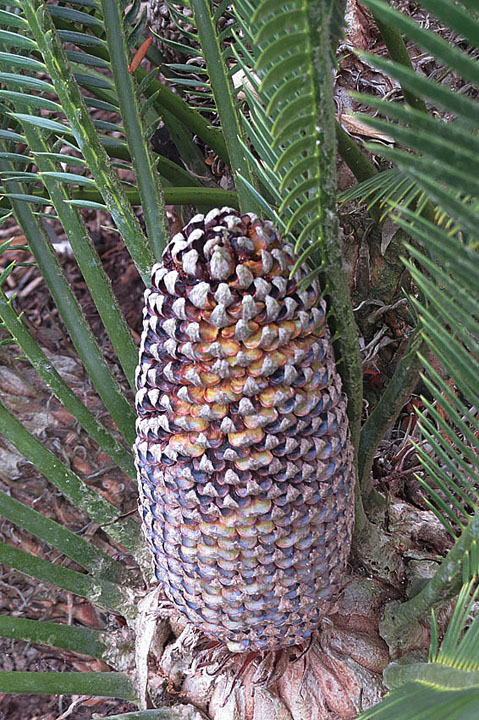
Cone

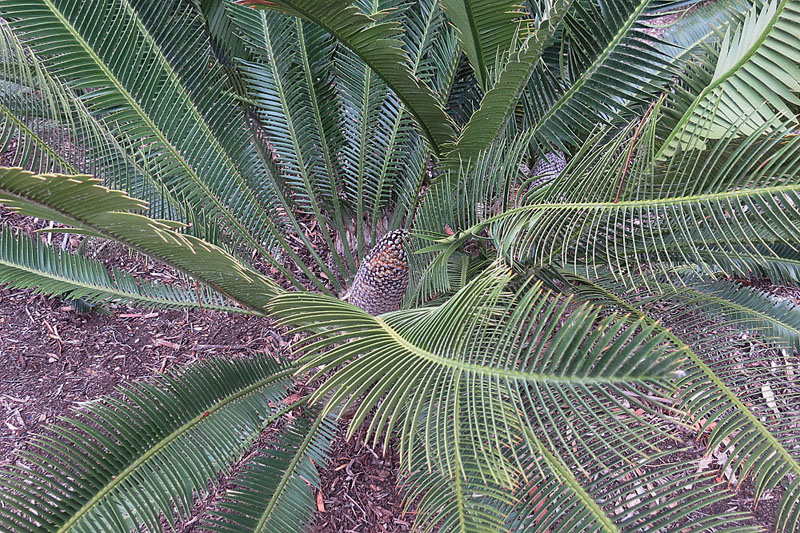
Leaves
