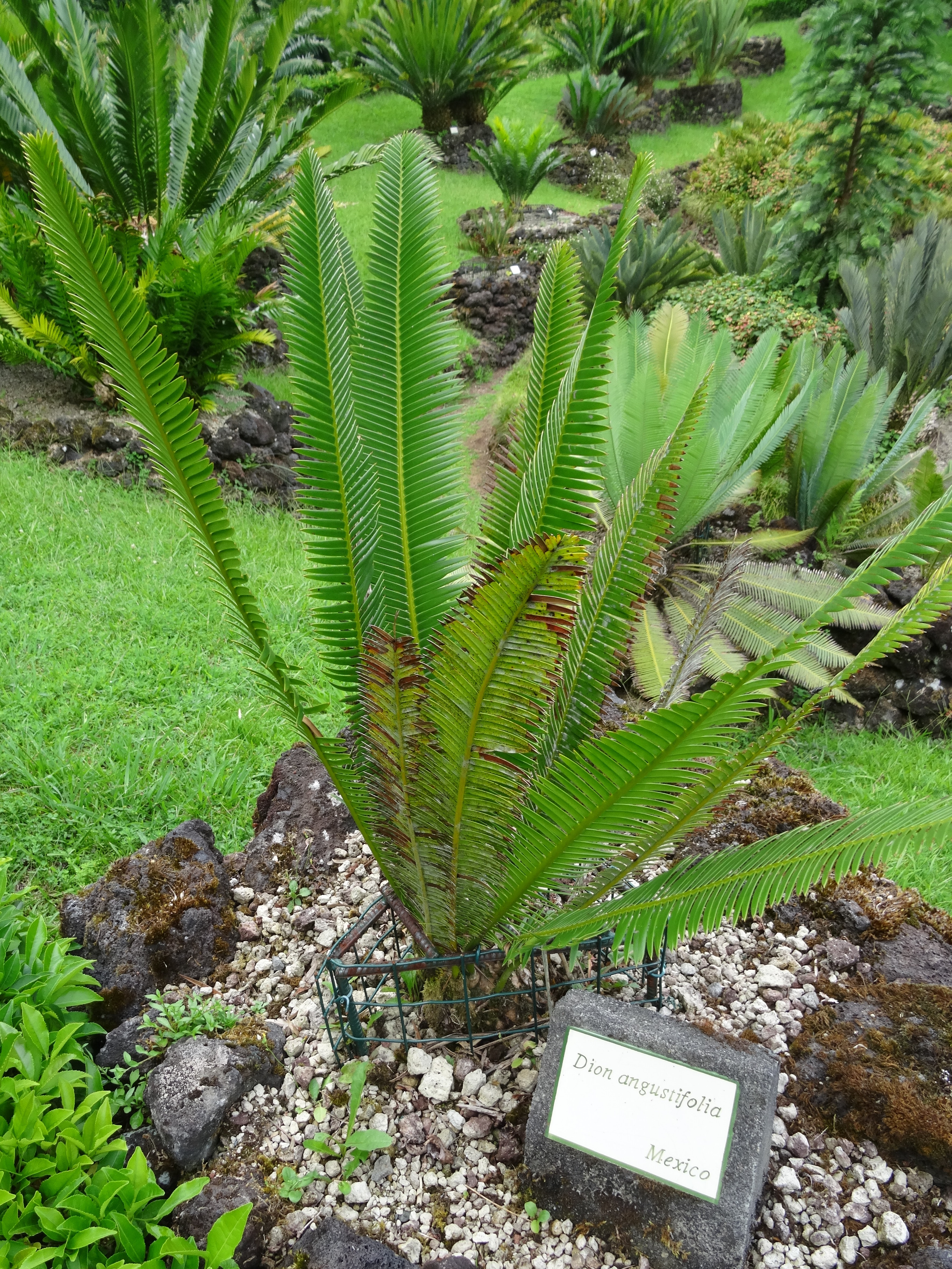

Scientific classification
- Kingdom: Plantae
- Clade: Tracheophytes
- Clade: Gymnospermae
- Division: Cycadophyta
- Class: Cycadopsida
- Order: Cycadales
- Family: Zamiaceae
- Genus: Dioon
- Species: D. angustifolium

Binomial name
- Dioon angustifolium Miq. 1847

Synonyms
- Dioon aculeatum Lem. 2009; Dioon edule fo. angustifolium (Miq.) Miq. 2009; Dioon edule var. angustifolium (Miq.) Miq. 2009

= Dioon angustifolium =

Species of cycad

Dioon angustifolium is a species of cycad that is endemic to Tamaulipas and Nuevo León, Mexico.

== Distribution ==
Plants occur in two main areas:

- the Sierra Madre Oriental and the Sierra de San Carlos, Sierra de Tamaulipas
- low hills in the vicinity of Soto la Marina, Tamaulipas
