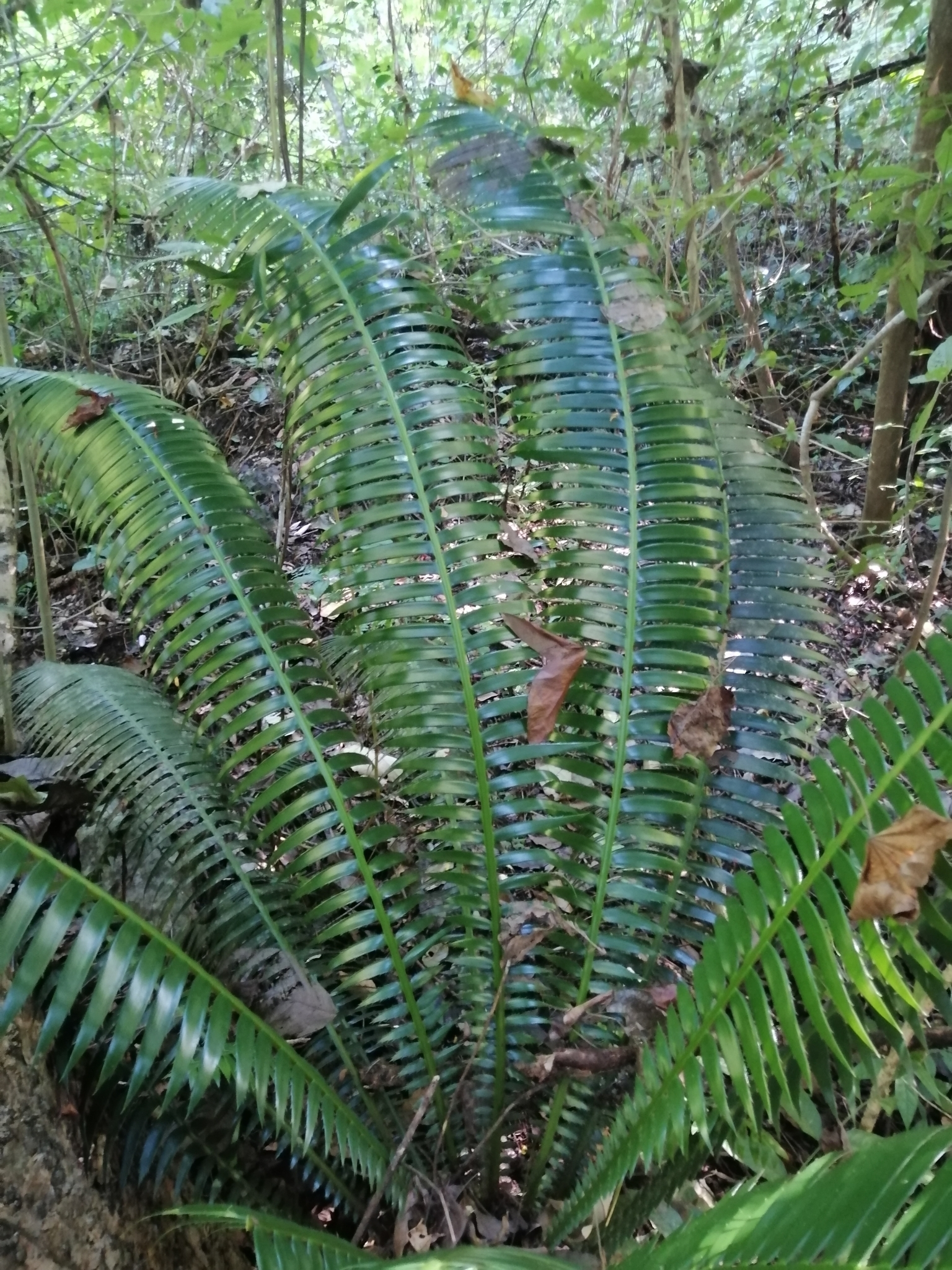
- Foliage on a young Dioon spinulosum at El Paraíso Zacatal, Oaxaca, Mexico

Conservation status
- Endangered (IUCN 3.1)

Scientific classification
- Kingdom: Plantae
- Clade: Embryophytes
- Clade: Tracheophytes
- Clade: Gymnosperms
- Division: Cycadophyta
- Class: Cycadopsida
- Order: Cycadales
- Family: Zamiaceae
- Genus: Dioon
- Species: D. spinulosum

Binomial name
- Dioon spinulosum Dyer ex Eichl.

= Dioon spinulosum =

Species of cycad

Dioon spinulosum, giant dioon or spiny dioon, is a cycad endemic to limestone cliffs and rocky hillsides in the tropical rainforests of Veracruz and Oaxaca, Mexico. It is one of the tallest cycads in the world, growing to 16 meters in height. The tree is found at low elevations to 300 meters above sea level.

Dioon spinulosum prefers well-drained soil with regular water. It will grow in soils containing few nutrients, in soils rich in limestone, and on slopes.

== Description ==
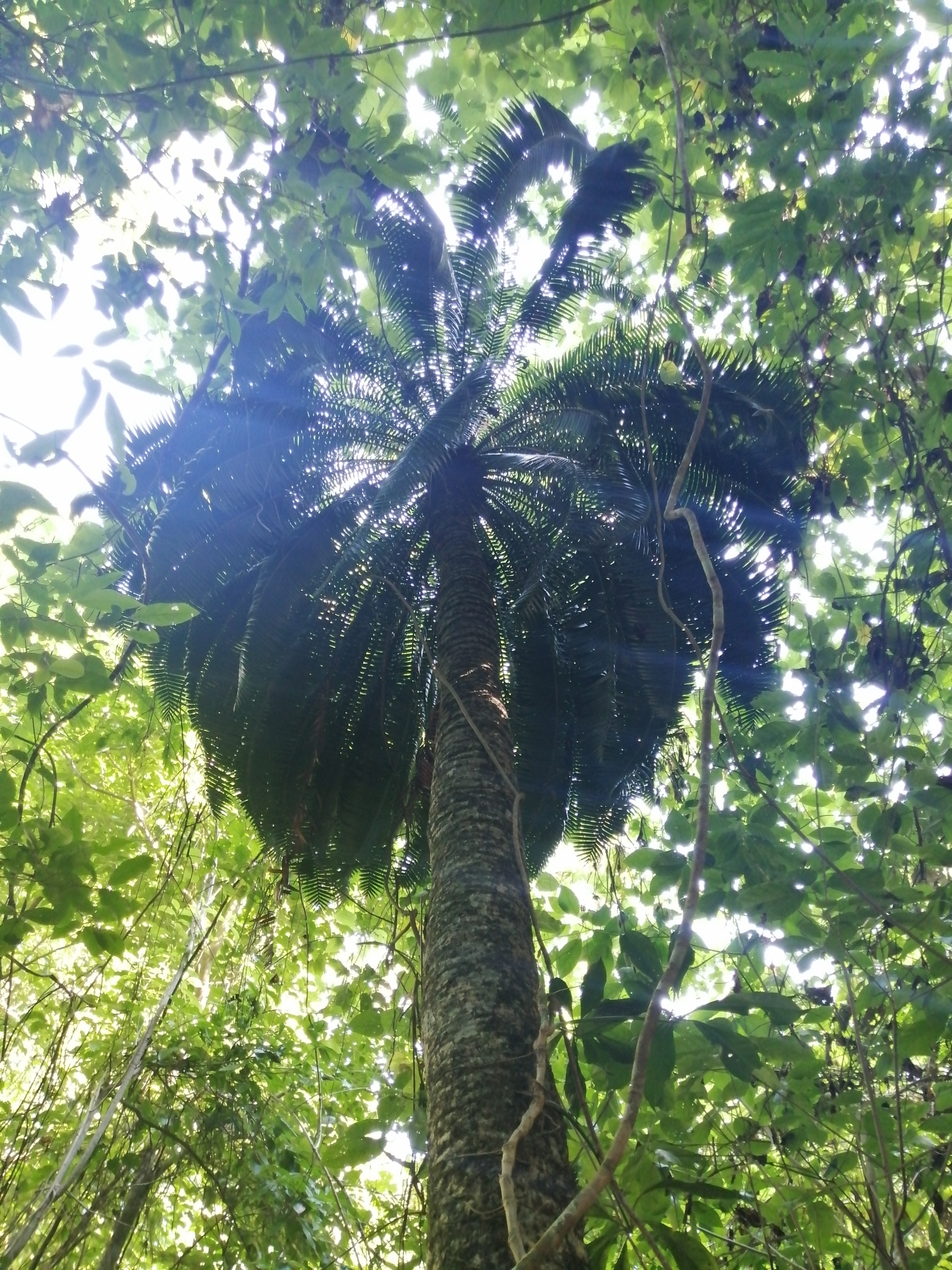
Mature Dioon spinulosum, Oaxaca, Mexico

Dioon spinulosum may exceptionally reach as much as 16 meters (52 ft) in height, but is more typically 3–6 m (10–20 ft) tall. Mature leaves are numerous and measure 1.5–2 m (4.9–6.6 ft) with 140 to 240 leaflets. The seed cones of the species are among the largest of the cycads. They measure almost 80 centimeters (31 in) in length together with its stem and 30 cm (12 in) in diameter.

== Taxonomy ==
Dioon spinulosum was scientifically described and named by August Wilhelm Eichler crediting William Turner Thiselton-Dyer in 1883. It is classified in the genus Dioon as part of the family Zamiaceae. According to Plants of the World Online it has no subspecies or synonyms.

=== Names ===
The species name, spinulosum, means "with small spines" referring to the edges of the leaves. It is known by the common names giant dioon, spiny dioon, and gum palm. In Spanish it is known as Coyolito de Cerro.

== Range and habitat ==
Dioon spinulosum is found wild in the Mexican states of Oaxaca and Veracruz in a total of three locations. It was more widely distributed in the past, but now grows in the lowlands of the Sierra Madre Oriental mountains. It grows on limestone hills and cliffs in the tropical evergreen rainforest there. It can be found at altitudes of 30 to 300 meters (100 to 980 ft) above sea level. It is typically a part of the understory with only a few individuals emerging from the forest canopy.

== Cultivation ==
In cultivation it is slow growing, and has a medium tolerance for salt. It is cold hardy in USDA zones 9B to 11.
