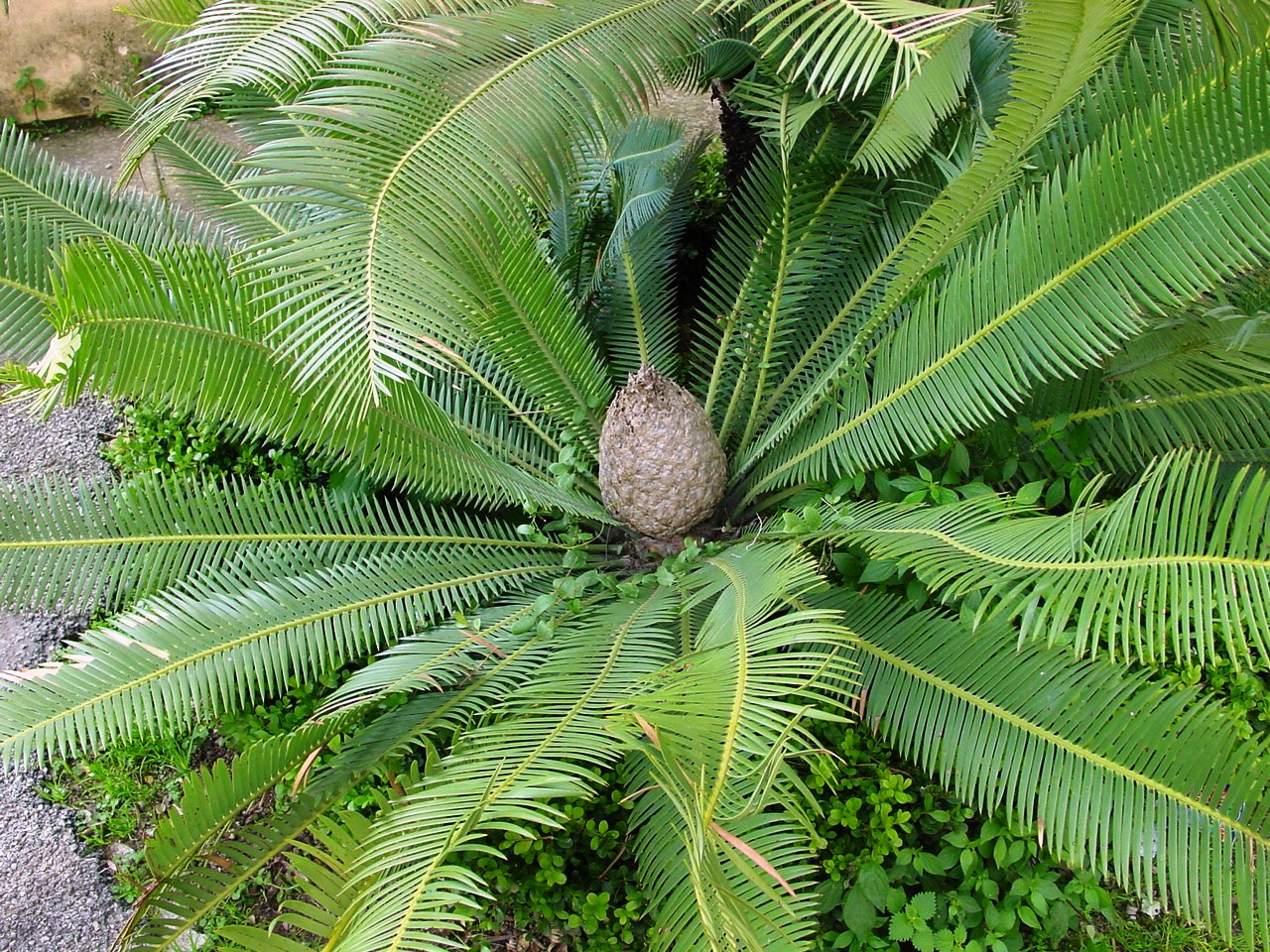
- Dioon edule

Scientific classification
- Kingdom: Plantae
- Clade: Embryophytes
- Clade: Tracheophytes
- Clade: Gymnosperms
- Division: Cycadophyta
- Class: Cycadopsida
- Order: Cycadales
- Family: Zamiaceae
- Subfamily: Encephalartoideae
- Tribe: Diooeae; Schuster
- Genus: Dioon; Lindl.

Type species
- Dioon edule Lindl.
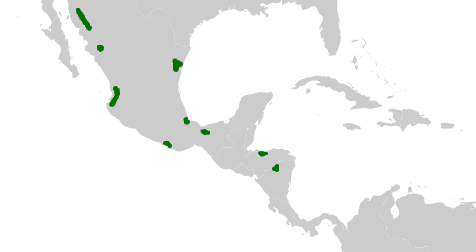

Synonyms
- Platyzamia Zucc.

= Dioon =

Dioon Temporal range: Paleogene-Present, Eocene–Holocene

Genus of cycads

Dioon is a genus of cycads in the family Zamiaceae. It is native to Mexico and Central America. Their habitats include tropical forests, pine-oak forest, and dry hillsides, canyons and coastal dunes.

== Description ==
Dioons are dioecious, palmlike shrubs with cylindrical stems, usually with many leaves. The species in the genus Dioon are perennial, evergreen cycads with cylindrical stem axis is partially in the ground. The plant is thickened and made of soft wood, rarely having above ground branches. Leaf bases are persistent or shedding to leave smooth bark. The leaves are pinnate, spirally arranged, interspersed with cataphylls, with leaflets not articulated and lacking a midrib. The lower leaflets are often reduced to spines. The sporophylls are not in vertical rows in cones, and the megasporophyll apices are broadly flattened, upturned, and overlapping.

Species in the genus Dioon have 2n = 18 chromosomes.

The largest species is D. spinolosum, which are over 16 meters (52 ft) high and whose trunk diameter can reach 40 centimeters (16 in). However, typical specimens of other species are only between three and six feet high or remain even smaller. Dioon can get very old, maybe even over 1000 years. Dioon edule and Dioon tomasellii have the most widespread ranges. Most species have highly limited geographical ranges.

=== Leaves ===
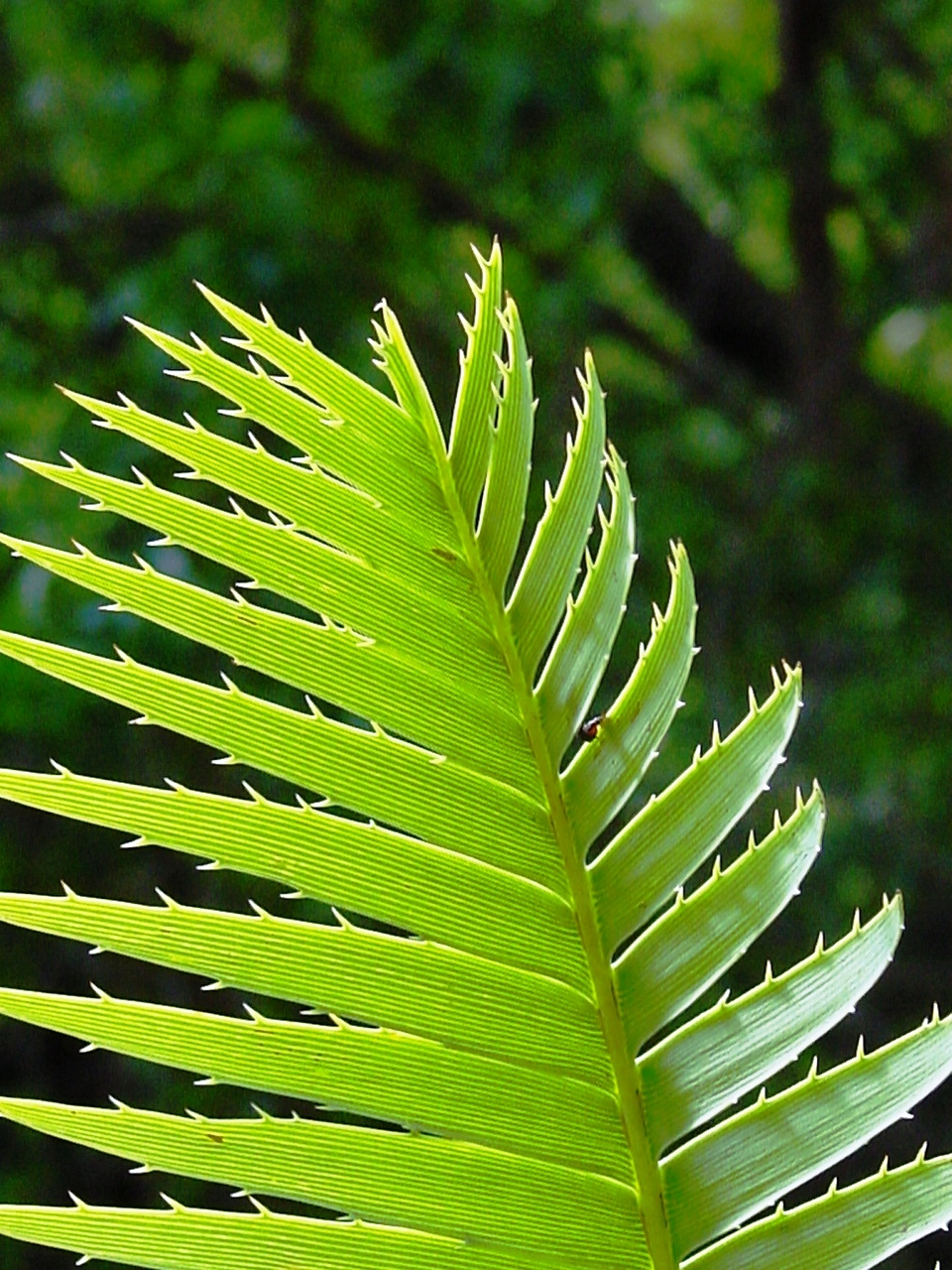
Leaf of Dioon spinulosum are identified by the veining and prickly margin.

The leaves are paired pinnate and are spirally on the stem axis. Some leaves are initially wrapped in protective leaves during their development, which are called cataphyll. Unlike other cycads such as Stangeria eriopus, the juvenile fins are not curled either transversely or longitudinally, but straight. The lower leaflets are often reduced to their petiole. The petioles are uncorned and thickened at the base.

The leaflets are simple, often with a prickly edge. The primary nerve consists of many forked dividing nerves, without a recognizable midrib. The nerves spring directly from the edge of the leaf rhachis and then run towards the plumage axis. The spars are hairy at least on young leaves. The hairs (trichomes) are colorless, branched or simple.

The stomata for the gas exchange are found either only on the underside of the leaf, or in some species on both sides. Glands are not otherwise colored and difficult to identify. The cells of the leaf epidermis are extended parallel to the plumage axis.

=== Roots ===
Like other cycads, coral-like roots are sometimes formed that grow up from the primary root and branch out quickly just below the soil surface. The individual roots are thickened rhizomes and are inhabited by cyanobacteria of the genus Nostoc, which mainly used them for nitrogen fixation. There also seems to be a symbiotic relationship with arbuscular mycorrhizal fungi.

=== Cones and seeds ===
All Dioons are dioecious, having either male or female organs, but only on different individuals. The male cone is stalked. The male cone scales called microsporophyll, which are flattened and bent upwards, sterile at the tip . They are arranged spirally around the pin axis. Each microsporophyll carries on its underside (abaxial side) a variety of pollen sacs. These open with slots, from which the pollen then escapes. The pollen grains are streamlined and have only one germ line (monosulcate). The male cones fall off after one year.

The female cones are also stalked and can remain on the plant for more than a year. The female microsporophyll are more leaf-like than those of other cycads, the greatest similarity to those of the genus Cycas. The scales are flattened at the top, widened and bent up. Each sporophyll carries two, rarely three, ovules. These are straight to the axis (orthotropic), are inclined inwardly to this (inverse) and hang on the axis-facing side of the thickened scales. The opening at the tip of the ovules (micropyle) is very small, leaving only a narrow opening on the Nucellus. The megaspore sheath thickened from 3–4.5 microns in the young ovule to 9–10 microns in the mature seed. The number of archegonia varies between one and ten. The nucleus of the egg is unusually large. The largest female cones of the genus D. spinolosum shows up to 80 centimeters in length and a diameter of up to 30 centimeters.

The seeds are spherical, ovate or ellipsoidal and reach a diameter between about one and four centimeters. They are surrounded by a fleshy, white or cream-colored seed coat. The seed coat consists of three layers, a fleshy outer and inner layer, between which a layer of stone cells lies. The embryo is straight with two cotyledons, these are fused at the top. The embryo carrier (suspensor) is very long and spirally twisted. The seeds are radiated (radiosperm). The germination takes place cryptocotylar, i.e. the cotyledons remain during germination in the seed.

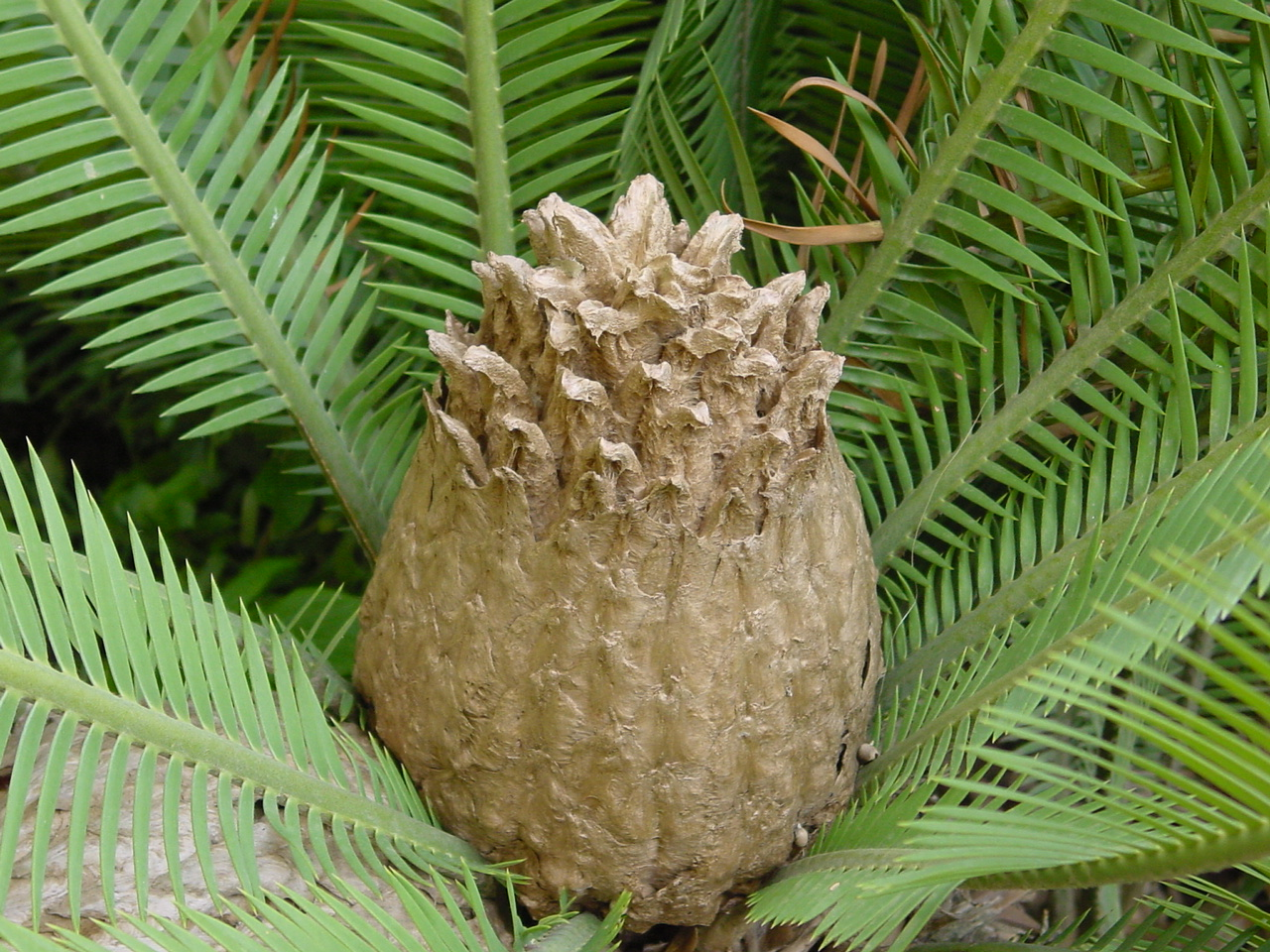
Female cone of Dioon edule

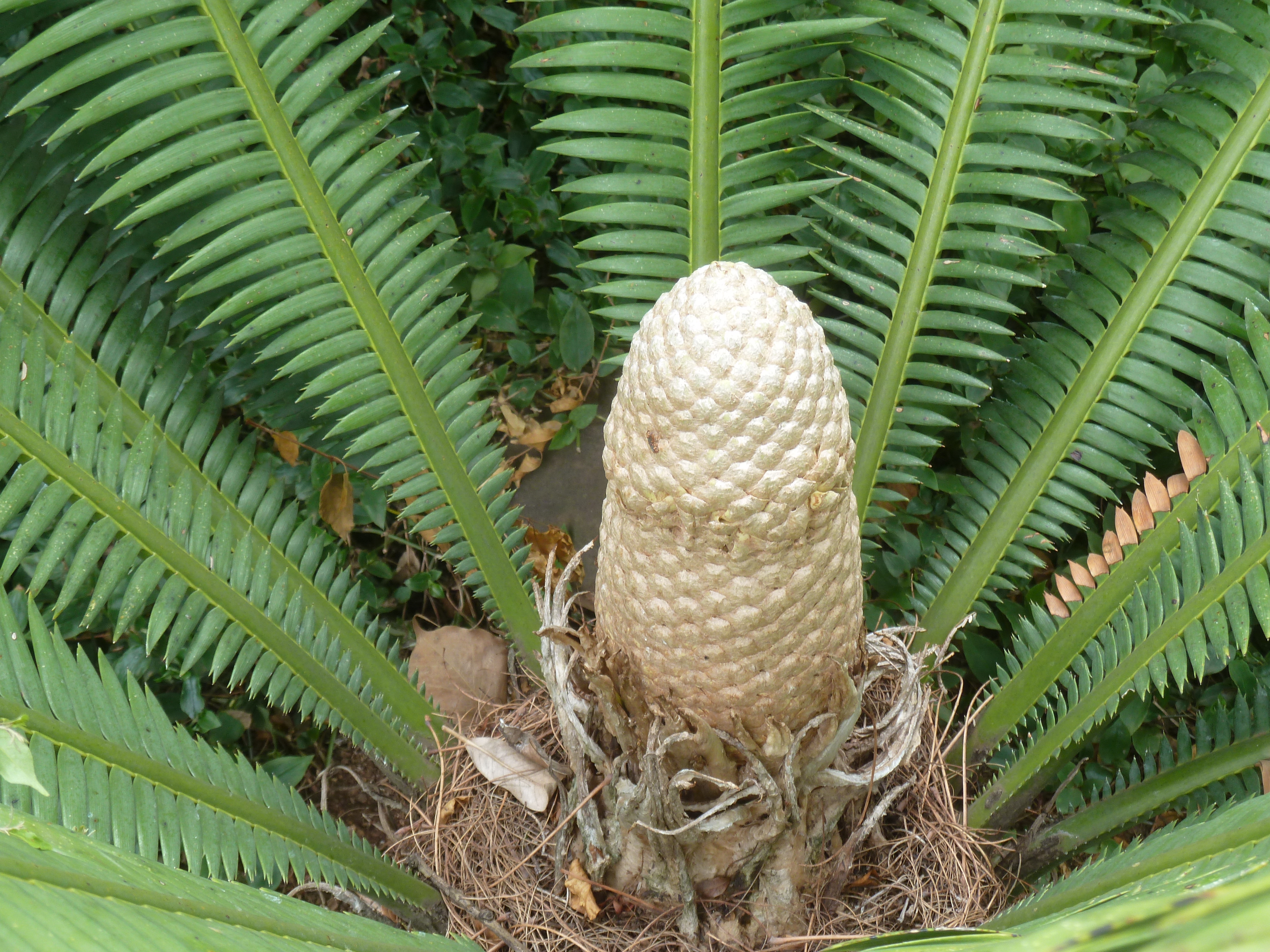
Male cone of Dioon mejiae

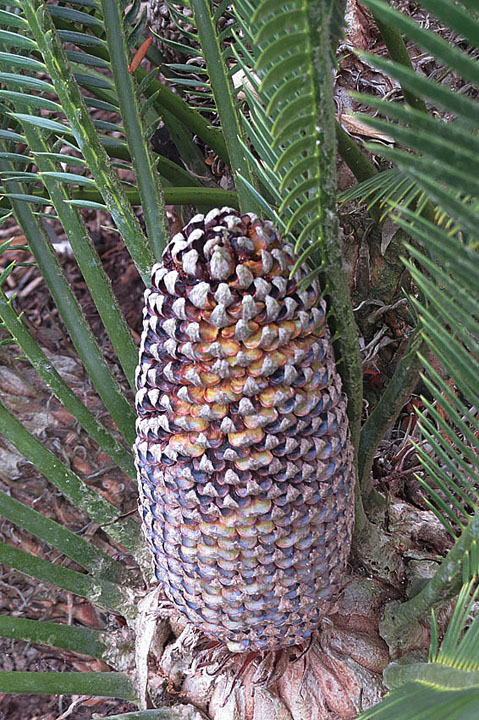
Cone of Dioon merolae

== Distribution ==
Dioon species can be found in Central America between the 15th and 29th northern latitude and are part of the Neotropical floral kingdom. The distribution area includes Honduras and parts of Mexico; it is limited by orographic conditions (height structures) and limited to the north to south mountain ranges in the region. Despite the widespread distribution and ecological plasticity of the genus it is not a vegetation-determining component. The species are found mainly in the tropical rain forest and in tropical wet forests, but also in tropical deciduous rainforests, with softwood rainforests, on dry, rocky slopes, in canyons and on dunes near the coast.

=== Prehistorical distribution ===
At the beginning of the Cenozoic, about 65.5 million years ago, the distribution area of Dioon probably included most of North America. Fossil found in northern Alaska from the Eocene epoch (55.8–33.9 Ma) indicate this.

While the climate was still very warm compared to today at the end of the Eocene, around 2.8 million years ago, the early ice age began with the icing of the North Pole, causing the distribution of Dioon to shrink very sharply.

In the Paleocene (66–55.8 Ma) Dioon was next to Zamia and Anemia the only today neotropical genus that was still present in the flora of Alaska. During the Tertiary period, about 2.6 million years ago, Dioon died out in almost all of North America with only a few small and isolated relic populations remaining in Central America, where today still the diversity center of this genus lies.

A spread to South America was not possible because the two continents were not connected until about 3 million years ago. After the Isthmus of Panama formed the size of its seeds has been speculated to have been the main obstacle to the further spreading of Dioon into the Caribbean and continental South America.

== Ecology ==
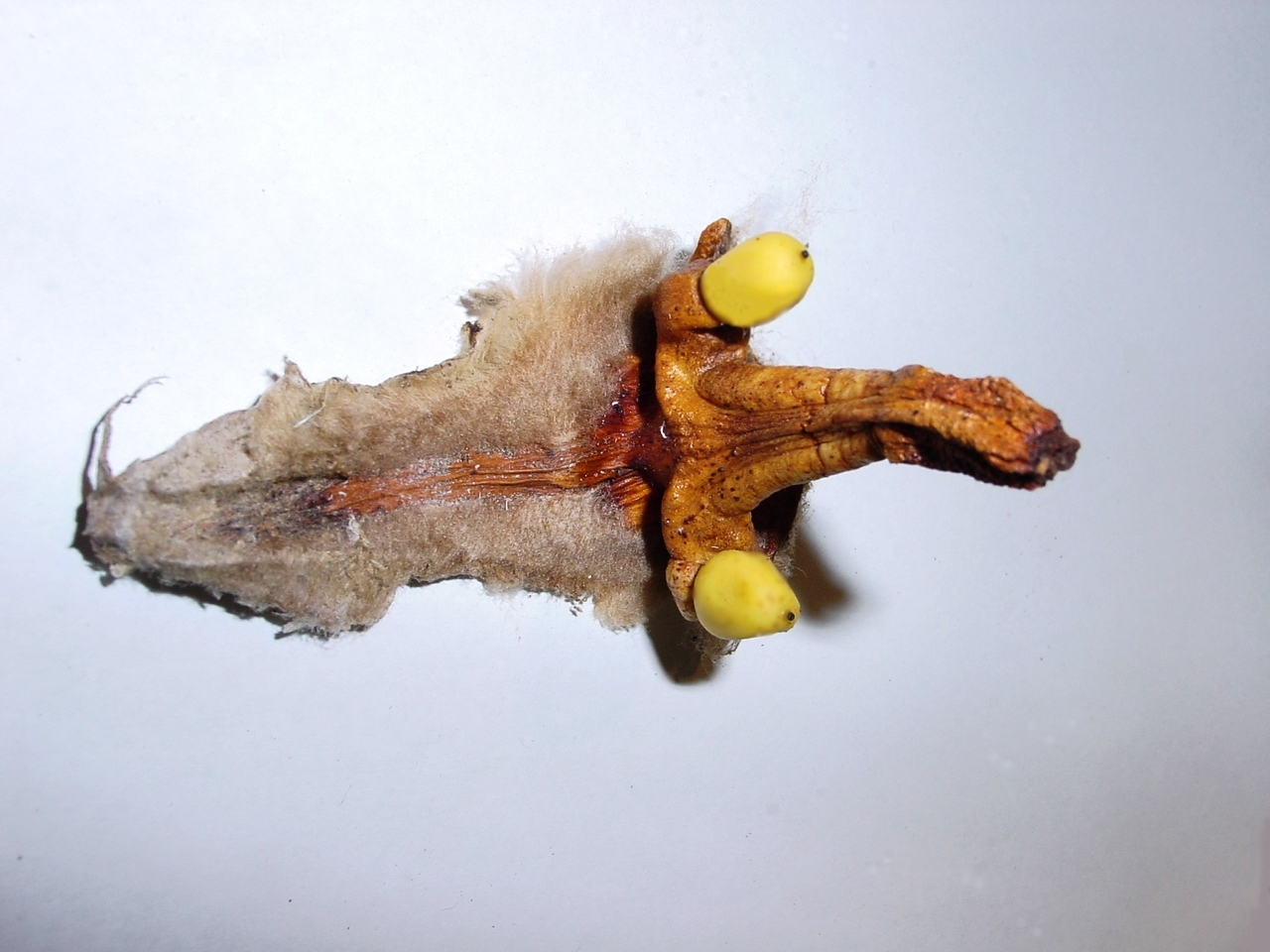
Megasporophyll from Dioon edule with ripe seeds. Right: the dry brown stalk, yellow: two seeds, left: the strongly hairy, flat part of the sporophyll

The method of pollination for Dioon plants, whether by wind or animals, has not yet been conclusively determined. The characteristics of the pollen, such as being light, dry, and present in large quantities, suggest wind pollination, which would result in more fertilized ovules near the source of pollen.

However, the arrangement of the ovules in Dioon plants does not support wind pollination, as the pollen has difficulty reaching them and tends to land on the sterile parts of the cone. In contrast, some cycads in the Zamia genus are known to be pollinated by the weevil Rhopalotria mollis. Similarly, in Dioon cones, there is evidence of a large number of beetles from the genus Pharaxonotha, which consume pollen, indicating possible pollination by animals.

== Conservation ==
The genus is particularly at risk from habitat destruction, the International Union for Conservation of Nature (IUCN) lists ten of the eleven species in a vulnerable category on their Red List. One species, D. caputoi, is considered to be critically endangered, three as endangered (D. holmgrenii, D. sonorense and D. tomasellii) and five as vulnerable. (D. califanoi, D. merolae, D. purpusii, D. rzedowskii and D. spinulosum). D. edule is listed as a kind of "near-threatened" list. For D. mejiae, there is not enough data for an assessment of the hazard.

Locations are destroyed primarily by clearing and reclamation of the land. Dioon species are also very popular with international collectors. Plants are dug up and sold. According to a report from the 1992 Washington Convention on Biological Diversity, trade with D. edule individuals reached a level of about 5,800 copies, with D. spinolosum 1,600 – this does not include illicit trade.

Another potential threat to the genus is the lobster louse (Diaspididae) Aulacaspis yasumatsui. The insect originally comes from Southeast Asia and infests there cycads. The pest has now been introduced to Florida, California, India and the UK, where it causes major damage to cycads. There he was also found at D. edule. If the species were to penetrate Central America, it could drastically reduce or even destroy the populations of Dioon in a short time.

== Taxonomy ==
The first description was made in 1843 by John Lindley as Dion. The genus name was given due to the two ovules per megasporophyll: Dioon comes from the ancient Greek prefix δι- di- (= two) and ώόν ōión, ōón (= egg).

The leaf-like character of Sporophylle gives Dioon a special position within the cycads. Dehgan & Dehgan described the genus as the most primitive of the cycads and suggested they put them into their own family. A molecular genetic study of the chloroplast DNA revealed that it is at least the most primitive genus of neotropical cycads.

=== Classification ===
Classically, the family of Zamiaceae is divided into two subfamilies with four tribes. Dioon is the only genus in the tribe of the Diooeae, which together with the Encephalarteae forms the subfamily of Encephalartoideae. This classification was based on morphological considerations. A morphological study of relationships in fossil and extant taxa revealed the following cladogram:

- - Clade with Zamia, Ceratozamia, Microcycas, Bowenia, Stangeria
  - - Microcycas
    - - Dioon
      - - Encephalartos
        - - Lepidozamia
          - Macrozamia

A molecular biology analysis of a fragment of 26S ribosomal DNA revealed a somewhat similar cladogram that would dramatically alter the structure of Zamiaceae. Dioon would therefore be the basal genus of the family.

- - Cycas (Cycadaceae)
  - - Stangeria (Stangeriaceae)
    - - Dioon
      - - Zamia
        - - Encephalartos
          - - - Lepidozamia
              - Ceratozamia
            - - Macrozamia
              - Microcycas

=== Species ===
The genus is commonly divided into two groups by Norstog & Nichols of distinct morphology. The first includes D. mejiae, D. rzedowskii, and D. spinulosum, which are characterized by the greater size of their fronds, trunks, and cones. The second group contains D. califanoi, D. caputoi, D. edule, D. holmgrenii, D. merolae, D. purpusii, D. sonorense, and D. tomasellii, which are smaller overall, with shorter trunks, much shorter fronds, and smaller cones.

A phylogenetic study from 1993 confirmed these clades with one difference – D. caputoi was assigned to the other clade

Phylogeny of Dioon

- - - D. mejiae Standley & Williams
    - - D. rzedowskii De Luca et al.
      - D. spinulosum Eichl. 1883 ex Dyer
  - - D. edule Lindley
    - - D. merolae De Luca, Sabato & Vázquez-Torres
      - - - - D. sonorense (De Luca, Sabato & Vázquez-Torres) Chemnick, Gregory & Salas-Morales
            - D. tomasellii De Luca, Sabato & Vázquez-Torres
          - - D. angustifolium Miquel
            - D. stevensonii Nicolalde-Morejón & Vovides
        - - D. purpusii Rose
          - - D. argenteum Gregory et al.
            - - D. califanoi De Luca & Sabato
              - - D. caputoi De Luca, Sabato & Vázquez-Torres
                - D. holmgrenii De Luca, Sabato & Vázquez-Torres

Species accepted:

| Image | Scientific name | Distribution |
|---|---|---|
| | Dioon angustifolium Miq. | Mexico (Nuevo León, Tamaulipas) |
| | Dioon argenteum T.J.Greg. & al. | Mexico (Oaxaca) |
| | Dioon califanoi De Luca & Sabato | Mexico (Puebla, Oaxaca) |
| | Dioon caputoi De Luca, Sabato & Vázq.Torres | Mexico (Puebla, Oaxaca) |
| | Dioon edule Lindl. | Mexico (Nuevo León, Tamaulipas, Veracruz, Guanajuato, Chiapas, Hidalgo, Mexico State, Querétaro, San Luis Potosí) |
| | Dioon holmgrenii De Luca, Sabato & Vázq.Torres | Mexico (Oaxaca) |
| | Dioon mejiae Standl. & L.O.Williams | Honduras |
| | Dioon merolae De Luca, Sabato & Vázq.Torres | Mexico (Oaxaca, Chiapas) |
| | Dioon nuusaviorum Mart.-Domínguez, Nic.-Mor. & D.W.Stev. | Mexico (Guerrero) |
| | Dioon oaxacensis Gutiérrez-Ortega, Pérez-Farrera & Vovides | Mexico (Oaxaca) |
| | Dioon planifolium Salas-Morales, Chemnick & Gregory | Mexico (Oaxaca) |
| | Dioon salas-moralesiae Gutiérrez-Ortega & Pérez-Farrera | Mexico (Oaxaca) |
| | Dioon purpusii Rose | Mexico (Oaxaca) |
| | Dioon rzedowskii De Luca, Sabato & Vázq.Torres | Mexico (Oaxaca) |
| | Dioon sonorense (De Luca, Sabato & Vázq.Torres) Chemnick et al. | Mexico (Sonora, Sinaloa) |
| | Dioon spinulosum Dyer ex Eichl | Mexico (Veracruz, Oaxaca ) |
| | Dioon stevensonii Nic.-Mor. & Vovides | Mexico (Michoacán, Guerrero) |
| | Dioon tomasellii De Luca, Sabato & Vázq.Torres | Mexico (Durango, Jalisco, Nayarit) |
| | Dioon vovidesii Gutiérrez-Ortega & Pérez-Farreras | Mexico (Sonora) |

=== Evolution ===
The earliest fossil finds date back to the Eocene and were found on Kupreanof Island in Alaska. However, it is probable that Dioon dates back to the Jurassic (145.5–199.6 ka) or even further, since fossils of other, closely related but more developed cycads were already detected from this era. In the Pleistocene (0.011784–1.8 ka) and Holocene (today -0.011784 ka) eras species have probably carried out several north–south migrations and have followed the warm climatic conditions.

One theory is that the recent dioon species have evolved from a number of vicarious events in the early Cenozoic, with different species representing different ecological conditions. These events must have followed each other for a very short time, which precluded an accumulation of synapomorphies, meaning that not many features could be re-acquired.

The extant species of Dioon are attributed to three prototypes. D. mejiae is considered the most evolutionary advanced species of the genus. D. spinulosum and D. rzedowskii are attributed to a second prototype, which was probably better adapted to mesial conditions, such as areas of medium humidity, which enable them to establish on the Atlantic coast of Oaxaca. The remaining species presumably come from a third, to xerotic, dry areas, adapted to the original form.

== Uses ==
In Honduras, the female cones of D. mejiae are picked to harvest the seeds. These are processed by about 33,000 indigenous people into tamales or tortillas and replace the cornmeal. The fronds are traditionally used on Palm Sunday.
