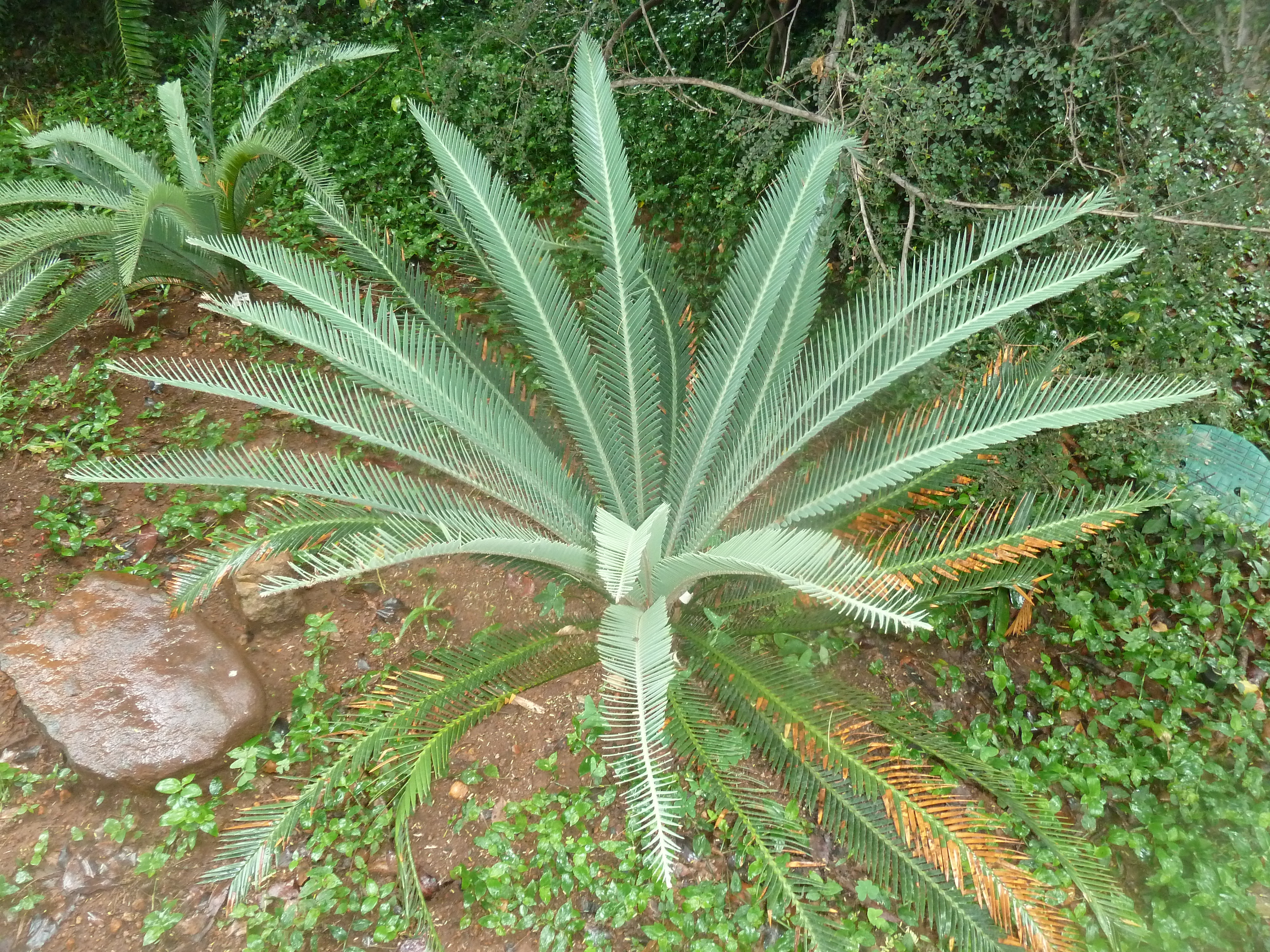

Conservation status
- Endangered (IUCN 3.1)

Scientific classification
- Kingdom: Plantae
- Clade: Tracheophytes
- Clade: Gymnospermae
- Division: Cycadophyta
- Class: Cycadopsida
- Order: Cycadales
- Family: Zamiaceae
- Genus: Dioon
- Species: D. califanoi

Binomial name
- Dioon califanoi De Luca & Sabato 1979

Synonyms
- Dioon edule var. califanoi (De Luca & Sabato) Nance 2009

= Dioon califanoi =

Species of cycad

Dioon califanoi is a species of cycad that is native to Oaxaca and Puebla states, Mexico. It is found near Teotitlán del Camino and Huautla de Jiménez.

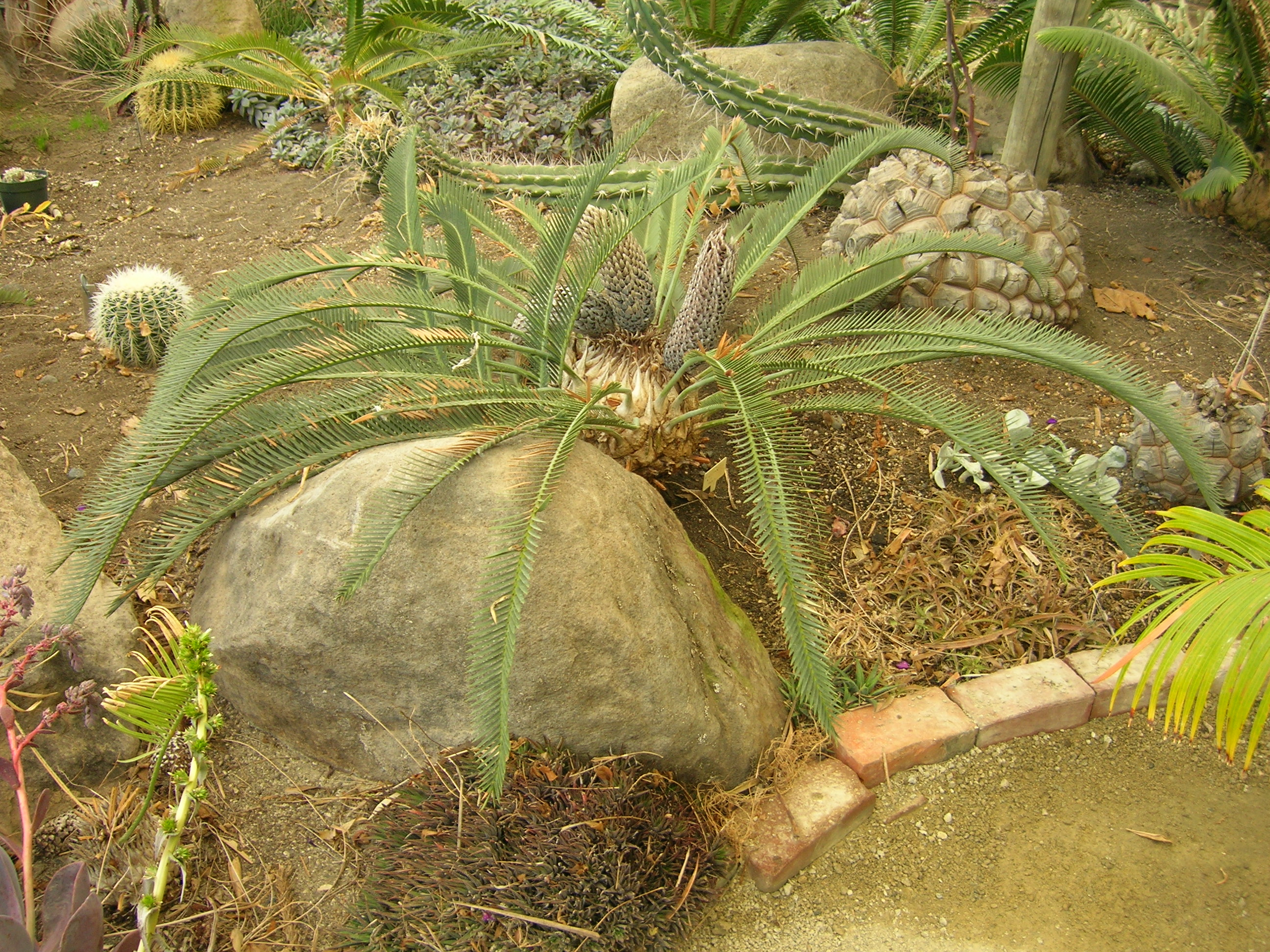
With cones in a greenhouse at Paloma Gardens, New Zealand

== Mutualism ==
The beetle Pharaxonotha bicolor is in an obligatory mutualistic relationship with Dioon califanoi, living and breeding in male cones and consuming pollen and cone tissues while serving as a pollinating vector by transferring pollen to female cones.
