= Dioon stevensonii =

Scientific classification
- Kingdom: Plantae
- Clade: Tracheophytes
- Clade: Gymnospermae
- Division: Cycadophyta
- Class: Cycadopsida
- Order: Cycadales
- Family: Zamiaceae
- Genus: Dioon
- Species: D. stevensonii

Binomial name
- Dioon stevensonii Nic.-Mor. & Vovides

Species of cycad

Dioon stevensonii is a species of cycad native to Mexico.
