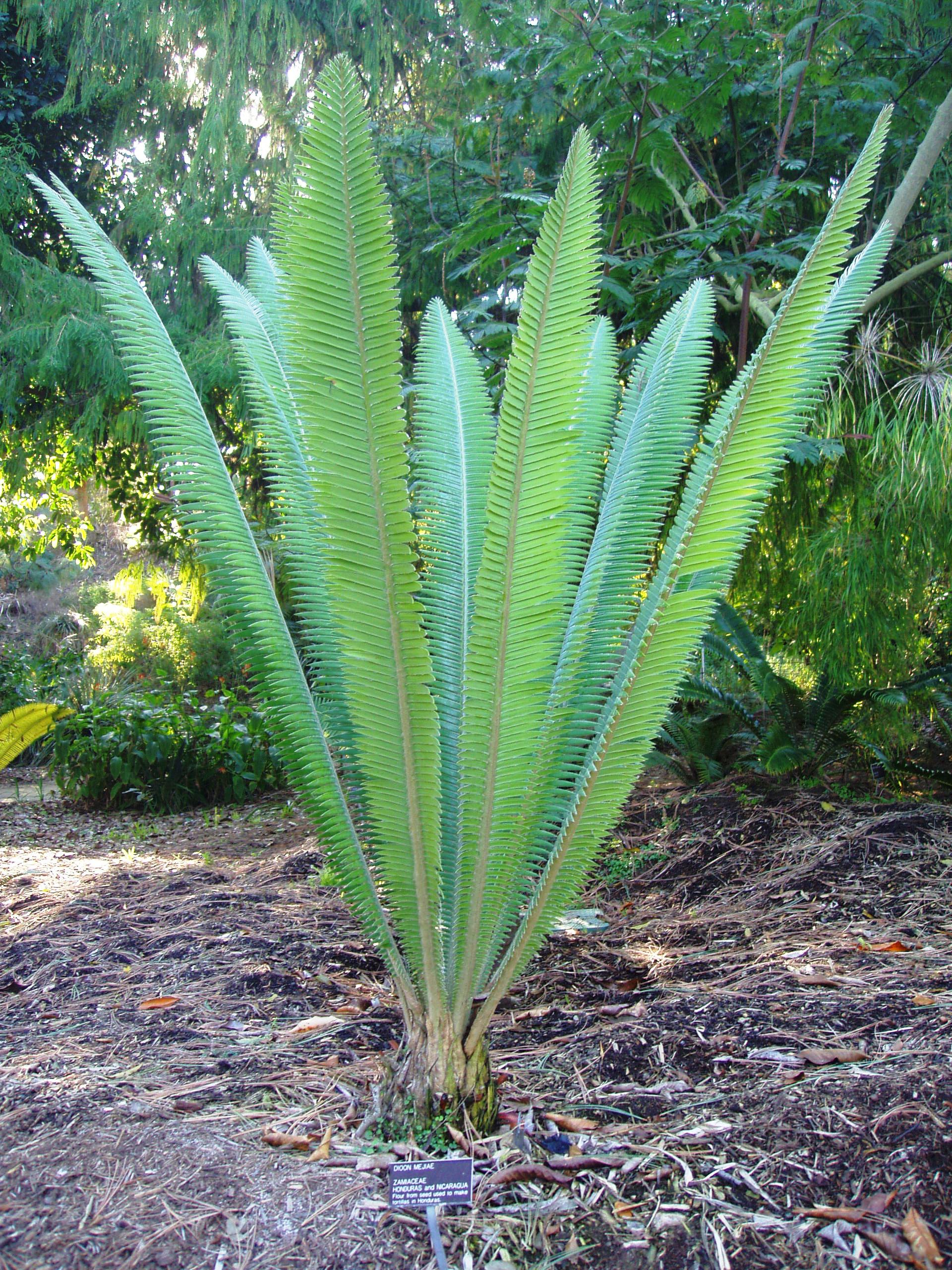

Conservation status
- Endangered (IUCN 3.1)

Scientific classification
- Kingdom: Plantae
- Clade: Tracheophytes
- Clade: Gymnospermae
- Division: Cycadophyta
- Class: Cycadopsida
- Order: Cycadales
- Family: Zamiaceae
- Genus: Dioon
- Species: D. mejiae

Binomial name
- Dioon mejiae Standl. & L.O.Williams

= Dioon mejiae =

Species of cycad

Dioon mejiae is a species of cycad that is native to Honduras. It is found in the departments of Colón, Olancho, and Yoro. Common names include palma teosinte, teocinte, teocinta (female), teocintle, teocsinte, teosinte, tiusinte, and tusinte, all of which mean "sacred ear."
