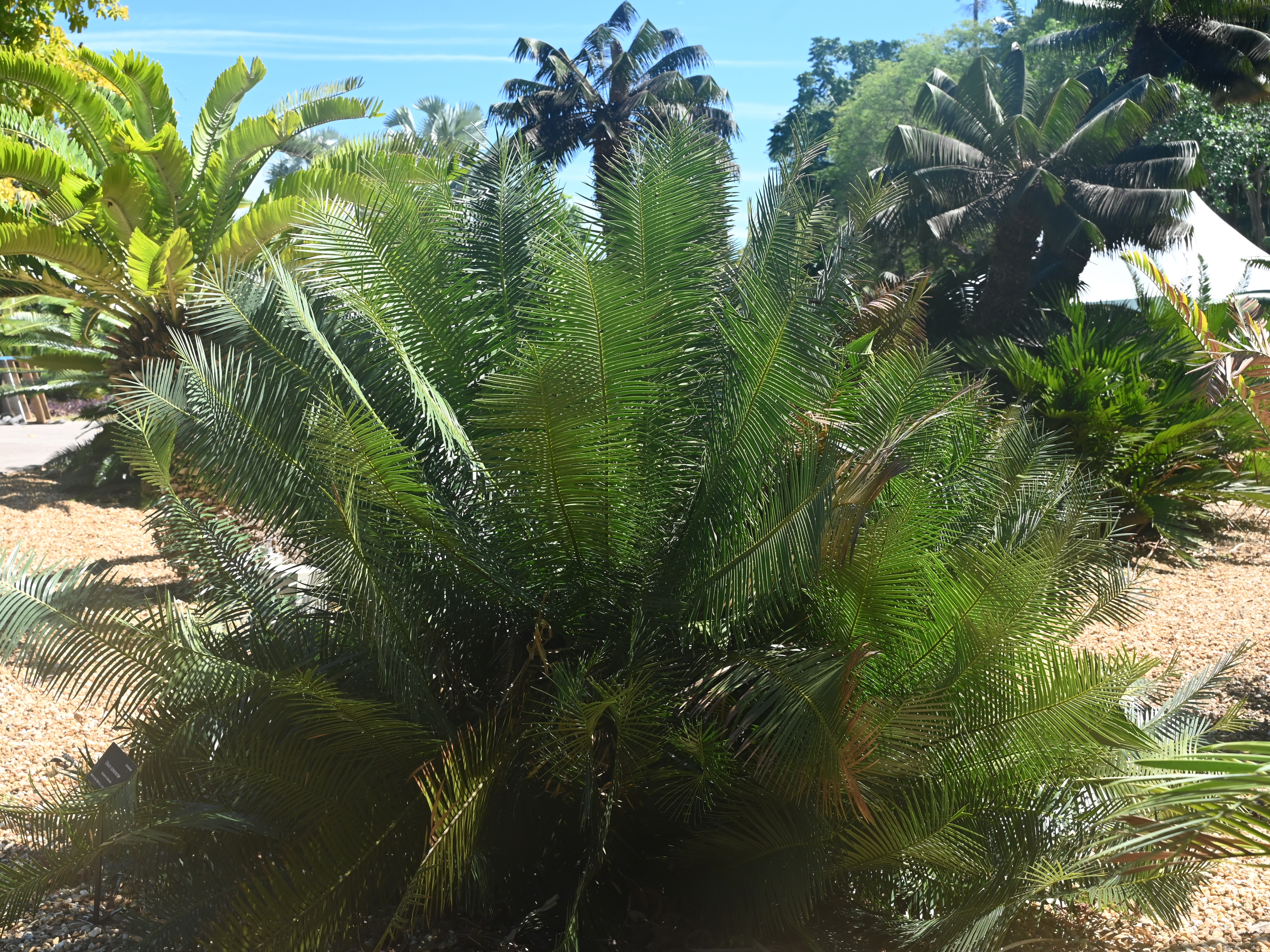
- In Fairchild Tropical Botanic Garden, Miami

Conservation status
- Endangered (IUCN 3.1)

Scientific classification
- Kingdom: Plantae
- Clade: Embryophytes
- Clade: Tracheophytes
- Clade: Spermatophytes
- Clade: Gymnosperms
- Division: Cycadophyta
- Class: Cycadopsida
- Order: Cycadales
- Family: Zamiaceae
- Genus: Dioon
- Species: D. sonorense

Binomial name
- Dioon sonorense (De Luca, Sabato & Vázq.Torres) Chemnick, T.Greg. & Salas-Morales

= Dioon sonorense =

Species of cycad

Dioon sonorense is a species of cycad native to northern Mexico, where it is found in the states of Sinaloa and Sonora.
