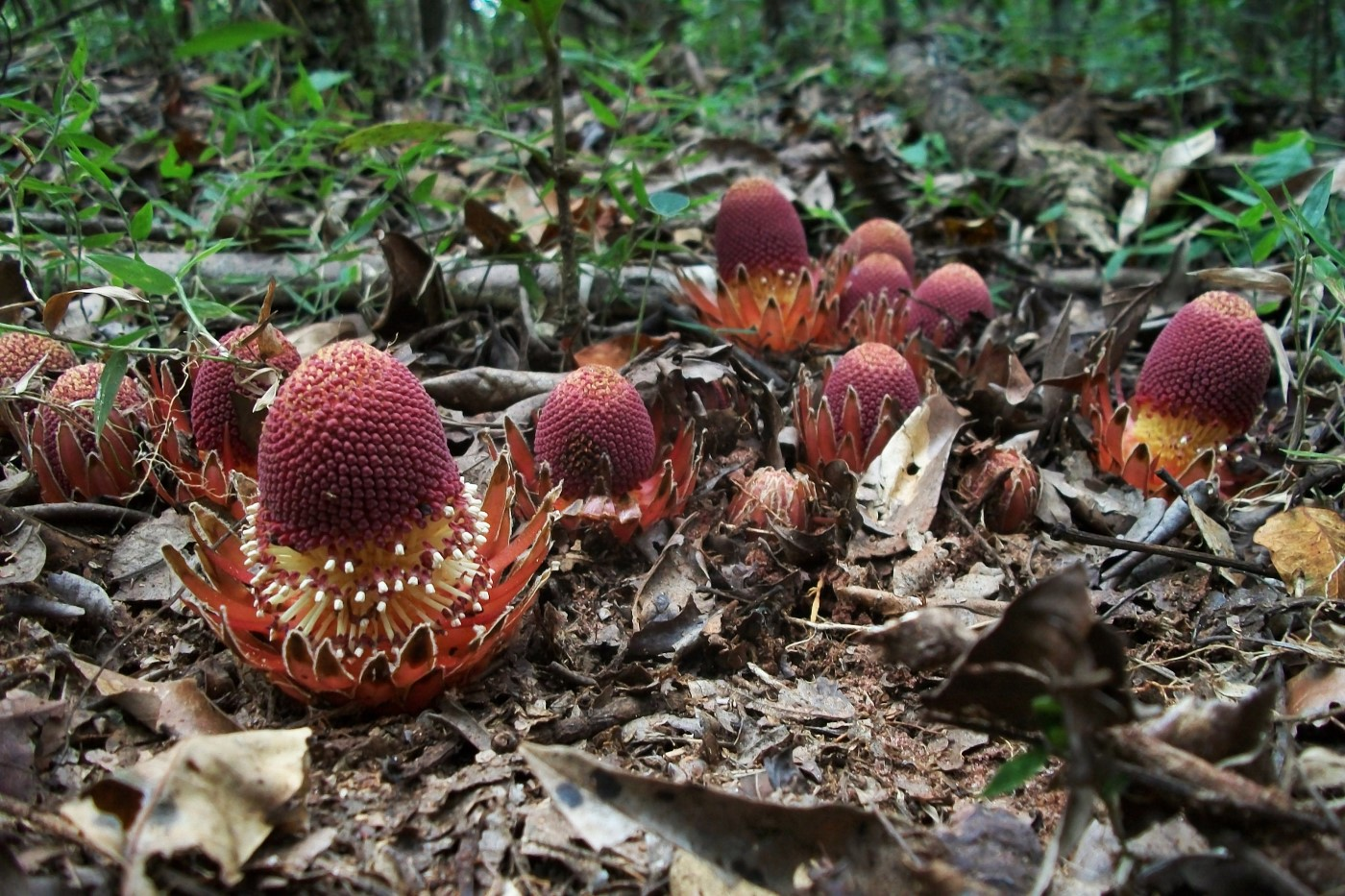

Scientific classification
- Kingdom: Plantae
- Clade: Tracheophytes
- Clade: Angiosperms
- Clade: Eudicots
- Order: Santalales
- Family: Balanophoraceae
- Genus: Langsdorffia
- Species: L. hypogaea

Binomial name
- Langsdorffia hypogaea Mart.

= Langsdorffia hypogaea =

Species of plant

Langsdorffia hypogaea is a parasitic plant in the family Balanophoraceae which parasitizes Quercus spp. (oaks) among others. It is native from southern Mexico through Central America to northern South America. It forms a pseudotuber composed of tissue of the host integrated with its own tissue that can be up to 1 m^{2} (1.2 sq yd) in size. The Langsdorffia flower clusters (which are capitula composed of myriads of tiny florets) emerge from the soil out of these "tubers".
