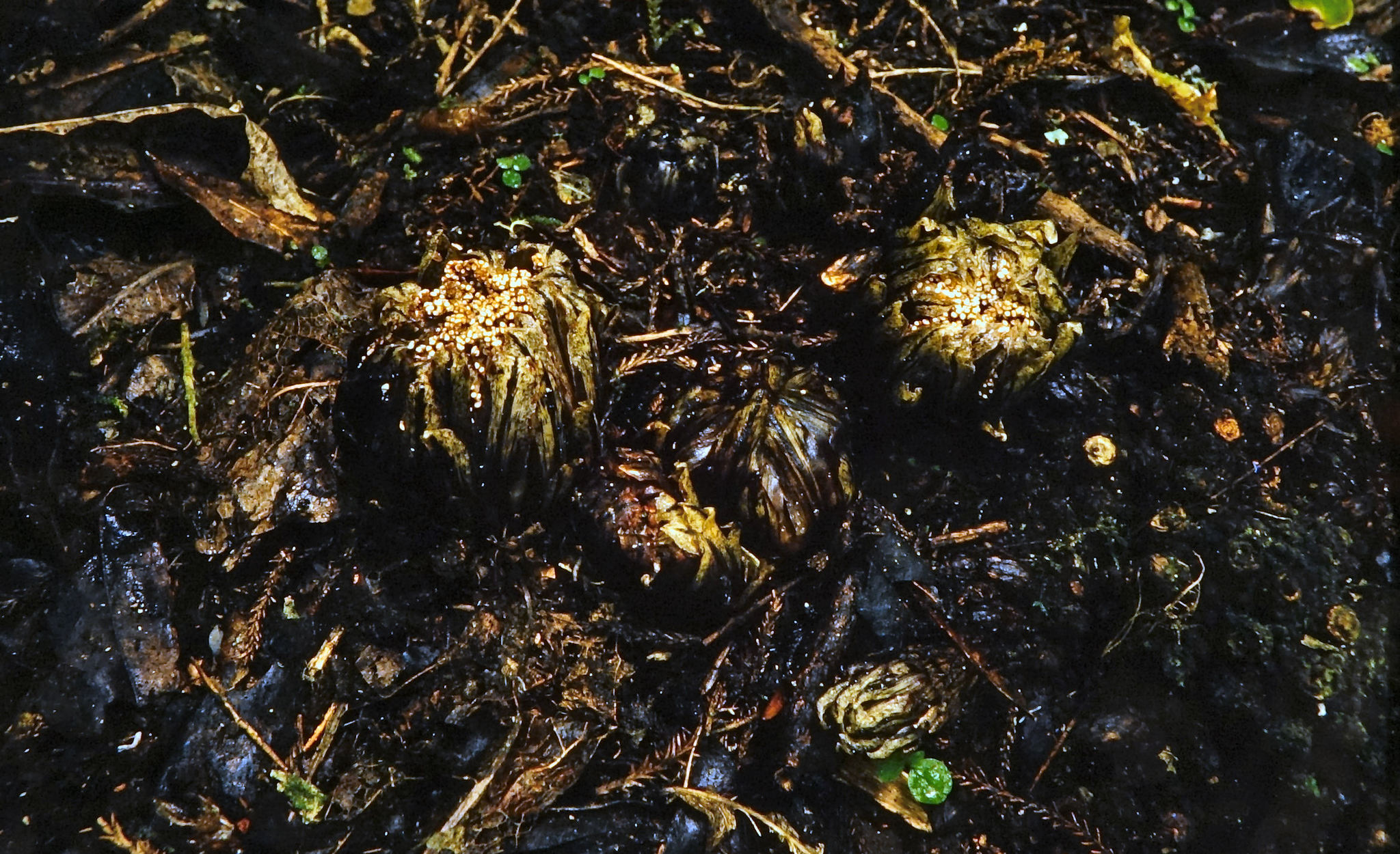

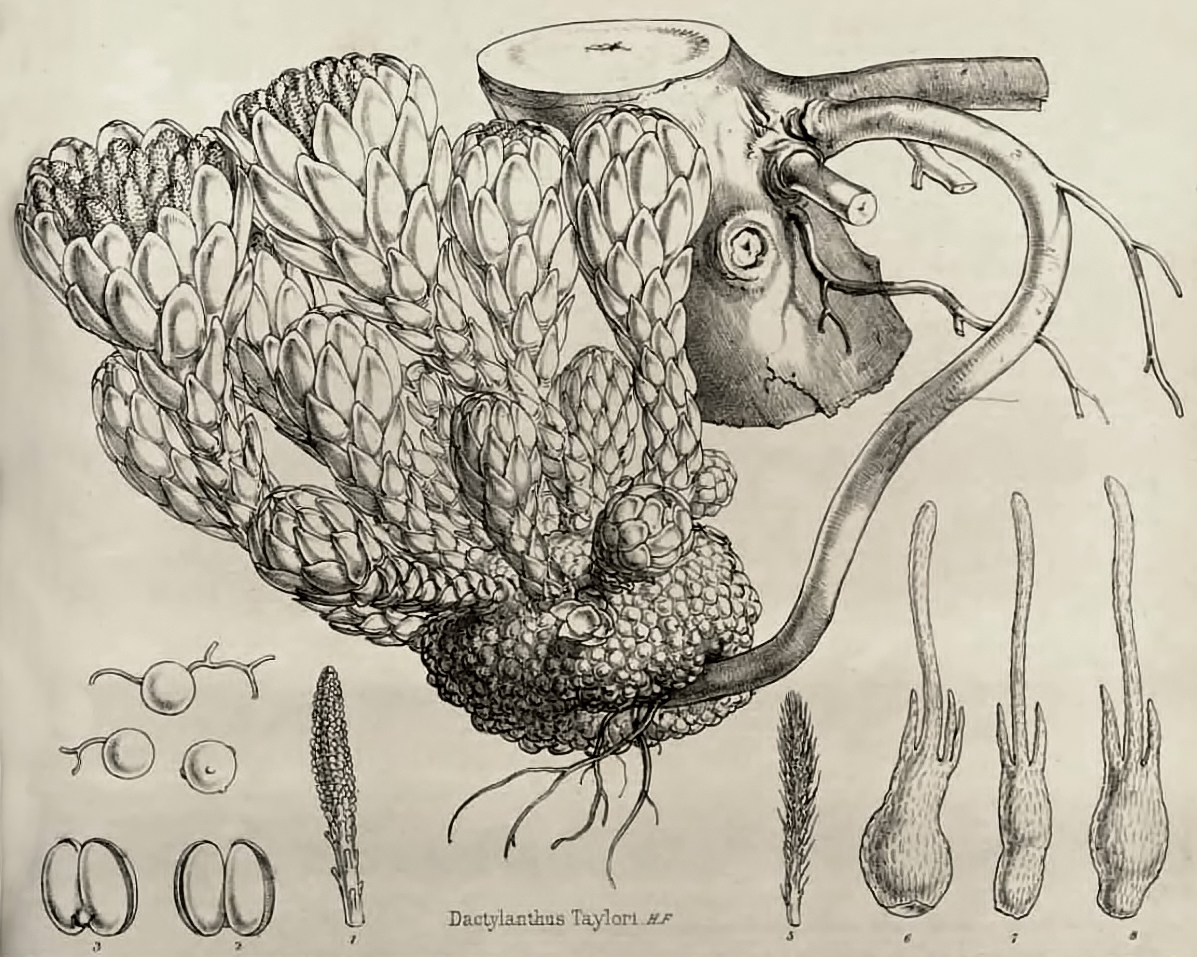

Conservation status
- Nationally Vulnerable (NZ TCS)

Scientific classification
- Kingdom: Plantae
- Clade: Tracheophytes
- Clade: Angiosperms
- Clade: Eudicots
- Order: Santalales
- Family: Balanophoraceae
- Genus: Dactylanthus; Hook.f.
- Species: D. taylorii

Binomial name
- Dactylanthus taylorii Hook.f.

= Dactylanthus taylorii =

Species of flowering plant

Dactylanthus taylorii, commonly known in English as wood rose and in Māori as te pua o te rēinga ("flower of the underworld"), is a fully parasitic flowering plant, the only one endemic to New Zealand. The host tree responds to the presence of Dactylanthus by forming a burl-like structure that resembles a fluted wooden rose (hence the common name). When the flowers emerge on the forest floor, they are pollinated by a ground-foraging species of native bat.

== Description ==
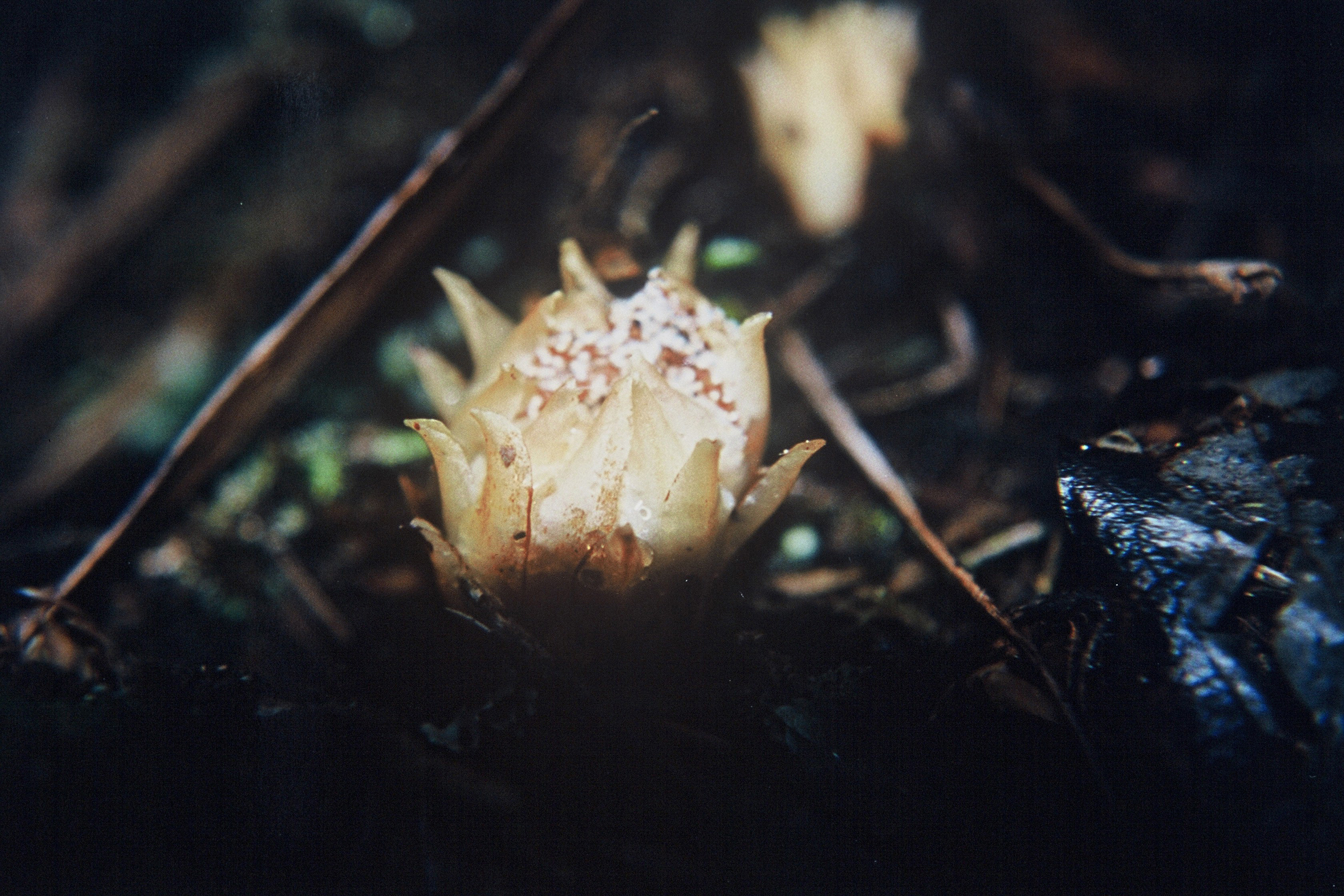
Dactylanthus taylorii in flower

Dactylanthus taylorii is a round, warty, tuber-like stem (up to 50 cm wide) or haustorium with no roots, which draws nutrients from the roots of its host. Its leaves do not photosynthesise, and are reduced to floral bracts. Some plants have been aged in excess of 30 years old. Dactylanthus prefers damp but not waterlogged soil, and is often found at the head of small streams. It parasitises about 30 species of native hardwood trees and shrubs, preferring those growing in secondary forest on the margin of mature podocarp forest. Common hosts include patē/seven-finger (Schefflera digitata), five-finger (Neopanax arboreus), lemonwood (Pittosporum eugenioides), and putaputawētā (Carpodetus serratus).

== Wood rose ==
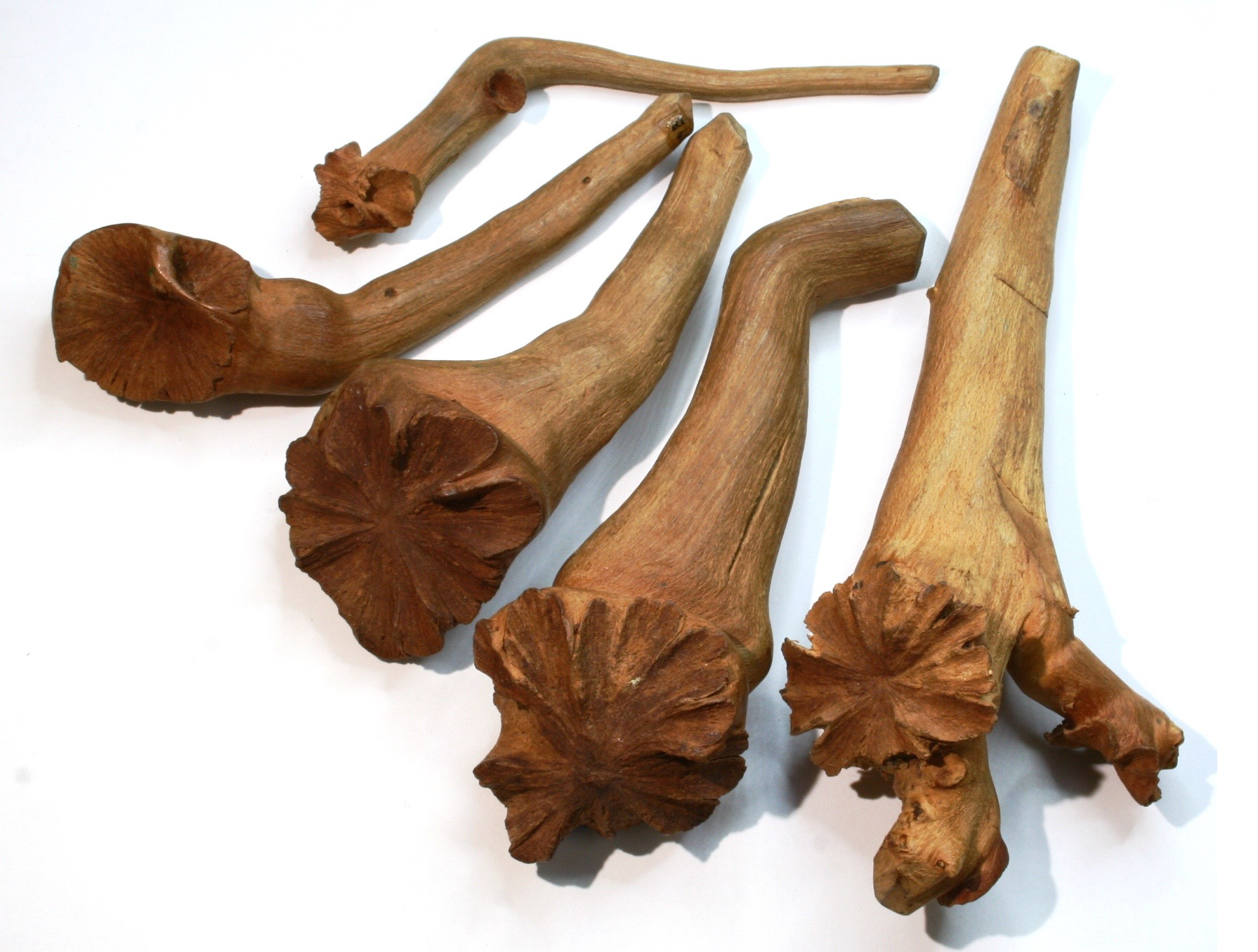
Wood roses in the collection of the Whanganui Regional Museum

The plant takes its common name from the attachment point between tuber and host. The host's roots expand to form a fluted disk, resembling a flower. This growth was once dug up in the thousands, incidentally killing the Dactylanthus, and sold as a collectable, often ending up as "a mantlepiece curiosity." It is illegal to collect wood roses from public land, and harvesting this threatened species is strongly discouraged.

== Taxonomy and naming ==
Dactylanthus taylorii was first discovered by Europeans in March 1845, when Rev. Richard Taylor came across it 12 km south of Raetihi. In 1856 Taylor took a specimen to Joseph Hooker in England, who formally described the species in 1859. The genus name is derived from the Greek δάκτυλος (dáktulos), “finger”, and ἄνθος (ánthos), “flower”. The specific epithet (taylorii, originally Taylori) honours Rev. Taylor. It is the only species in the genus.

Taylor stated that the Māori name for wood rose was pua reinga (more grammatically, te pua o Te Rēinga, "flower of the underworld", poetically rendered by Hooker as "flower of Hades"). Hill noted that at least in the Taupō region this name referred to a different parasitic plant, Thismia, and claimed the Māori name for Dactylanthus was waewae atua, "feet or toes of the spirits/gods".

The closest relative of Dactylanthus is Hachettea from New Caledonia. Along with Mystropetalon from South Africa, they comprise the Southern Hemisphere group Mystropetalaceae. All three are holoparasites, lacking chlorophyll, and are descended from hemiparasitic root parasites, which could photosynthesise.

== Reproduction ==
Plants are dioecious, either male or female, and only rarely hermaphrodites. They flower between February and May and are primarily pollinated by the native short-tailed bat. Male flowers produce nectar that provides a simple but very sweet fragrance which promotes bat-pollination. Analysis of fossil coprolites suggest the kākāpō (Strigops habroptilus), a flightless nocturnal parrot, was also a pollinator. Pollinated plants produce fruits slightly under 2 mm (0.079 in) long. The nectar exudes a musky smell that resembles mammalian sweat. Introduced mice and rats also pollinate them, although rats tend to destroy them.

== Distribution ==
Dactylanthus is currently found only in the North Island, although there is evidence from fossil pollen it lived recently in the northern South Island. It ranges from Puketi Forest in Northland through the Coromandel Peninsula as far south as Mt Bruce, and from Mt Taranaki to Te Araroa on the East Coast. In 2025 a remnant population was discovered near Wainuiomata, the first time the species had been observed in the wild in the Wellington region since 1914. It also lives on Little Barrier Island. The plant is cryptic and hence hard to survey. Many sites likely are known only to collectors, as the woody growth has commercial value. In 2020 plants from Pureora Forest were transplanted to Zealandia and Otari-Wilton's Bush reserves in Wellington. Ngā Manu Nature Reserve in Waikanae has two established, flowering sites as well as two sites added in 2021.

== Conservation status ==
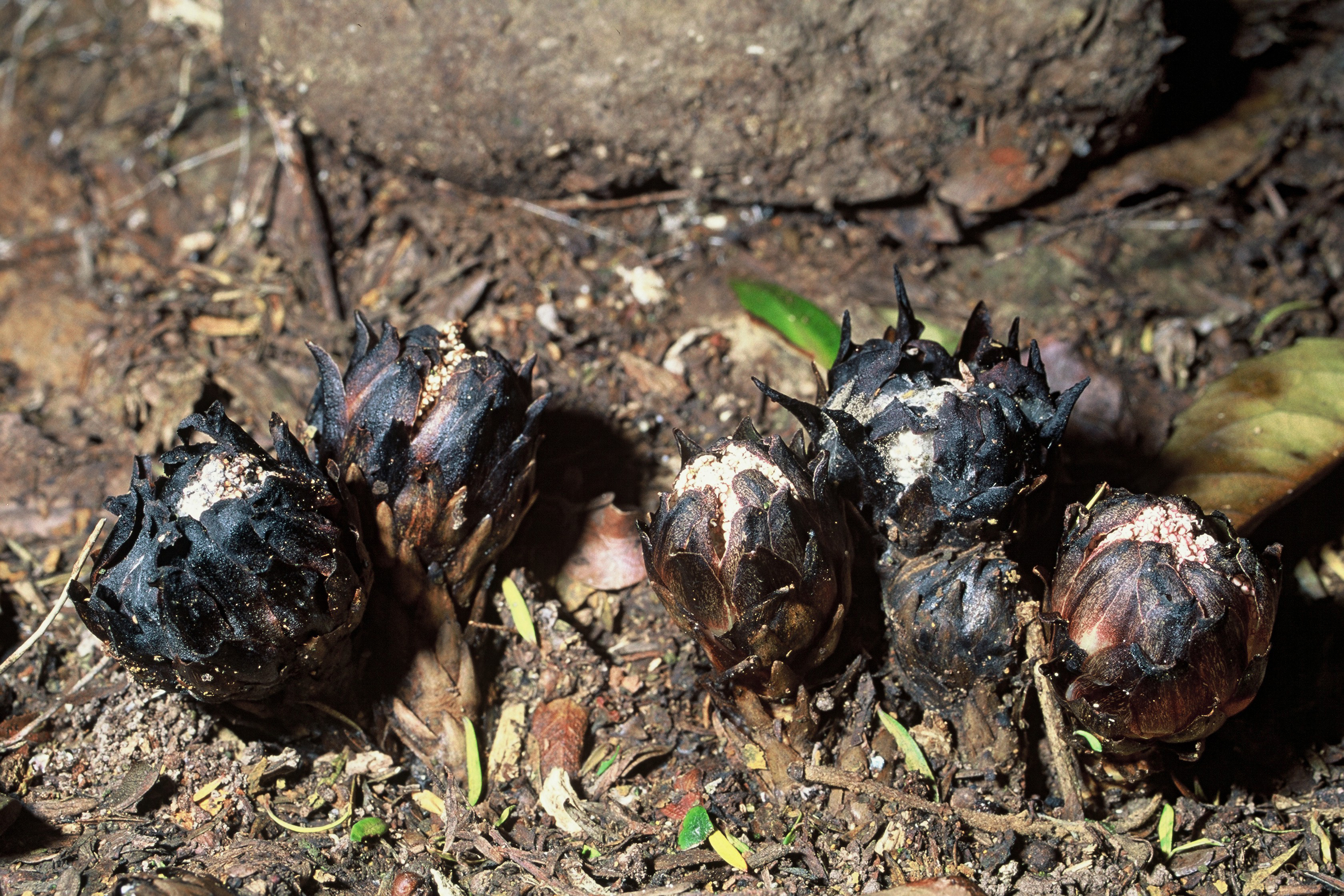
Male Dactylanthus flowers which have been protected from kiore.

Dactylanthus is regarded, as of 2012, as Threatened – Nationally Vulnerable. The New Zealand Department of Conservation started a recovery plan in 1995. The wood rose is under threat from harvesting by collectors, browsing by possums, rats, pigs and deer, habitat loss, and the rarity of its pollinators and seed dispersers. Control of the browsing mammals that feed on Dactylanthus, especially possums and kiore, is one conservation strategy. Another is to enclose the plants in protective cages. Because cages also exclude the plant's pollinators, its flowers then need to be hand-pollinated, and the resulting seed set turns out to be no better than in uncaged plants. Dactylanthus has recently been successfully translocated in the wild by sown seeds in closed-canopy forest.

In May 2025, a wild population of Dactylanthus was discovered in the Wainuiomata Water Collection Area near Wellington. The species had been thought to be extinct in the Wellington Region for over a century. A management plan will be prepared to assist in preserving this wild population.
