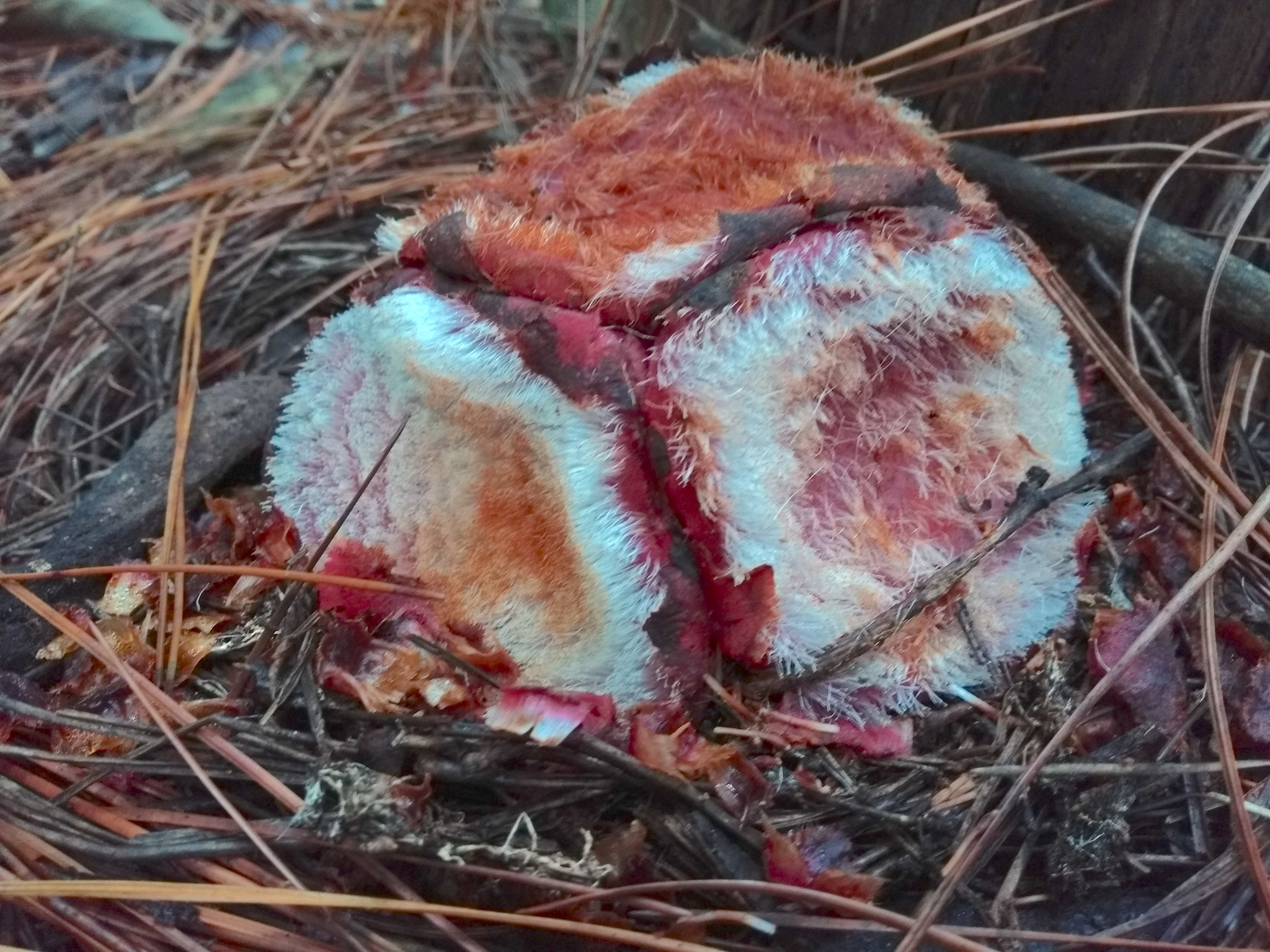

Scientific classification
- Kingdom: Plantae
- Clade: Tracheophytes
- Clade: Angiosperms
- Clade: Eudicots
- Order: Santalales
- Family: Balanophoraceae
- Genus: Scybalium
- Species: S. fungiforme

Binomial name
- Scybalium fungiforme Schott & Endl.

= Scybalium fungiforme =

Species of plant

Scybalium fungiforme is a species of parasitic plant in the family Balanophoraceae. It is commonly known as Cogumelo-de-caboclo in Brazil, where it is found. It was first described in 1832 by Heinrich Wilhelm Schott and Stephan Endlicher.

== Description ==
Scybalium fungiforme is a parasite which feeds on the roots of other plants. The flowers are described as "gory, red, [and] funguslike". The stem forms a lobed tuber. The leafs are bracts which are elliptical, adorned with pappus, and have margins that range from fimbrate to lacerate. The arrangement of the inflorescence is dense. Stem flowers are funnel-shaped (infundibular), and the receptacle is disc-shaped (discoid).

It is commonly known by the name "cogumelo-de-caboclo" in Brazil. Other names include cogumelo-de-sangue, esponja-de-raiz, and fel-da-terra.

== Taxonomy ==
Scybalium fungiforme is a poorly-known plant in the family Balanophoraceae. It is one of seven species of its family found in Brazil, and one of two members of its genus found there.

== Distribution ==
The distribution of Scybalium fungiforme is restricted to Atlantic forests in the Central-West and Southeast of Brazil, more so in forests below 1,400 metres (4,600 ft) sea level. It has been recorded in the following Brazilian states: Espírito Santo, Goiás, Minas Gerais, Paraná, Rio de Janeiro, and São Paulo.

Flora e Funga do Brasil notes that it is also found in the Central Brazilian Savanna. It prefers gallery forest, ombrophyllous forest, riverine forest, and seasonal semideciduous forest.

== Conservation ==
In a 2008 review of plants of Brazil in the Lista de Ameaça de Flora e Fauna do Estado de Minas Gerais it was listed as "vulnerable".

== Life history ==
=== Pollination ===
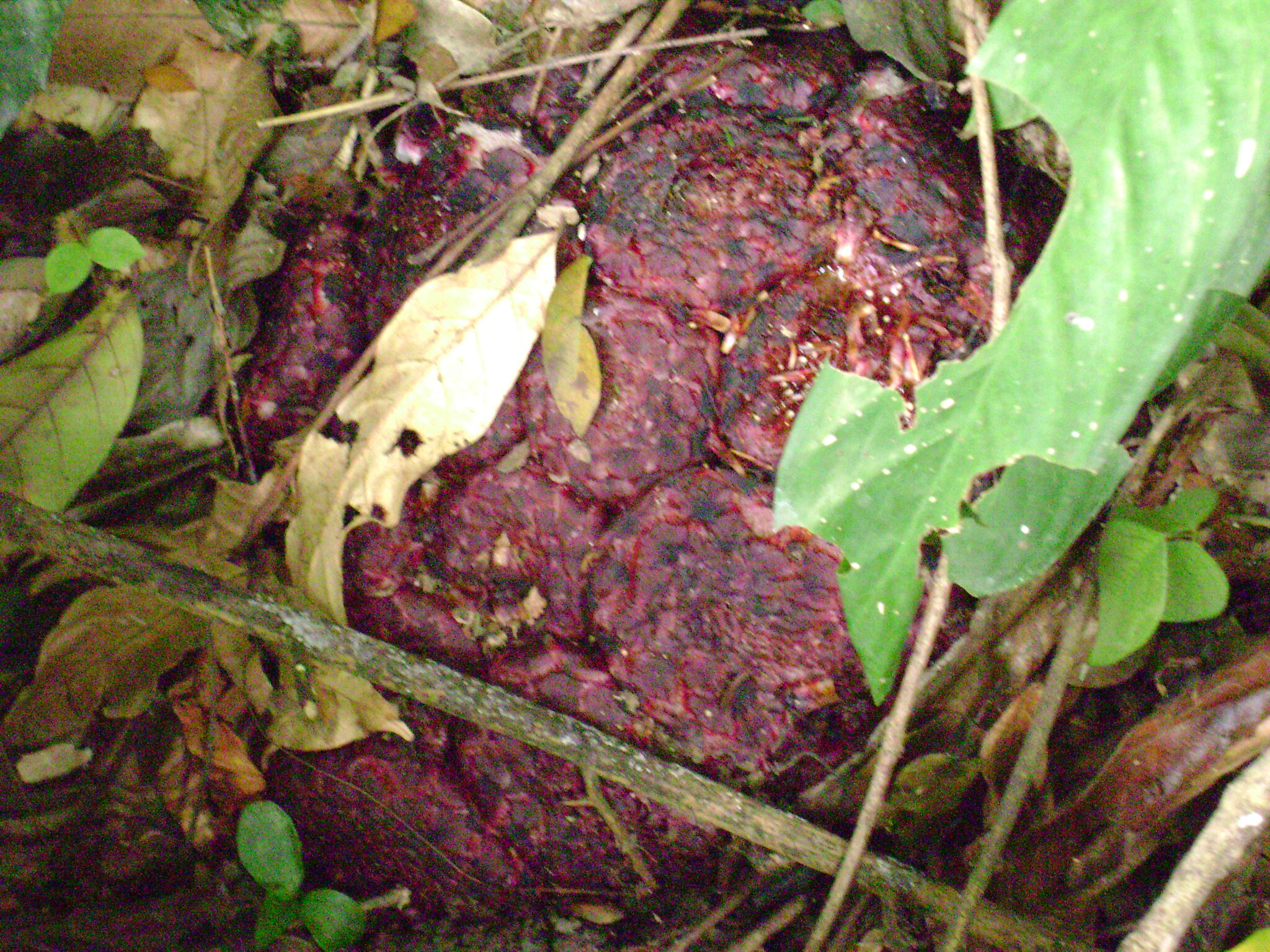
S. fungiforme flower with bracts intact.

It was theorized by Professor Patrícia Morellato of the São Paulo State University in the 1990s that the flowers of Scybalium fungiforme were pollinated by opossums. This was because the flowers were covered by sturdy scales (bracts), making it difficult for animals to be able to pollinate the flowers effectively. Opossums, with opposable thumbs, were potentially able to pollinate the flowers because of their dexterity. This was noted alongside the floral construction resembling that of Australian and South African members of the family Proteaceae which are associated with pollination by non-flying nocturnal mammals. Traits including dull coloration of the flowers, nocturnal anthesis paired with copious nectar production, and geoflory (flowering underground). Previous evidence of opossums with nectar on their snouts were unable to be recognized as evidence for the theory as there was no record of direct pollination by the opossums. Doctor Felipe Amorim would hypothesize later on that because of the flower's morphology, it would potentially be pollinated by a non-flying animal. Amorim's students had hypothesized the plant's pollination by rodents.

Observations in the Serra do Japi Biological Reserve in May 2019 confirmed Morellato's theory. Cameras that were placed on the site observed opossums (Didelphis aurita) removing the plant's bracts before inserting their faces into the flowers in order to consume its nectar. The montane grass mouse (Akodon montensis) was also recorded visiting S. fungiforme inflorescences. Follow-up studies showed that an additional species of opossum (Didelphis albiventris) and tanagers (Tachyphonus coronatus) are among the pollinators that participate in the removal of bracts from the flower.

Scybalium fungiforme's unique pollination syndrome entails opossums, the plant's primary pollinator, who are uniquely capable of doing so, peeling the plants' bracts back in order to drink the plant's nectar. Secondary pollinators, such as bees (Apis mellifera, Trigona spinipes), wasps (Agelaia angulata), and hummingbirds (Thalurania glaucopis), would then drink the exposed flowers' nectar. While the plant's morphology is suited for ground-dwelling predators, the discovery of hummingbird pollinators for the plant was surprising to researchers.

Primary pollinators of Scybalium fungiforme

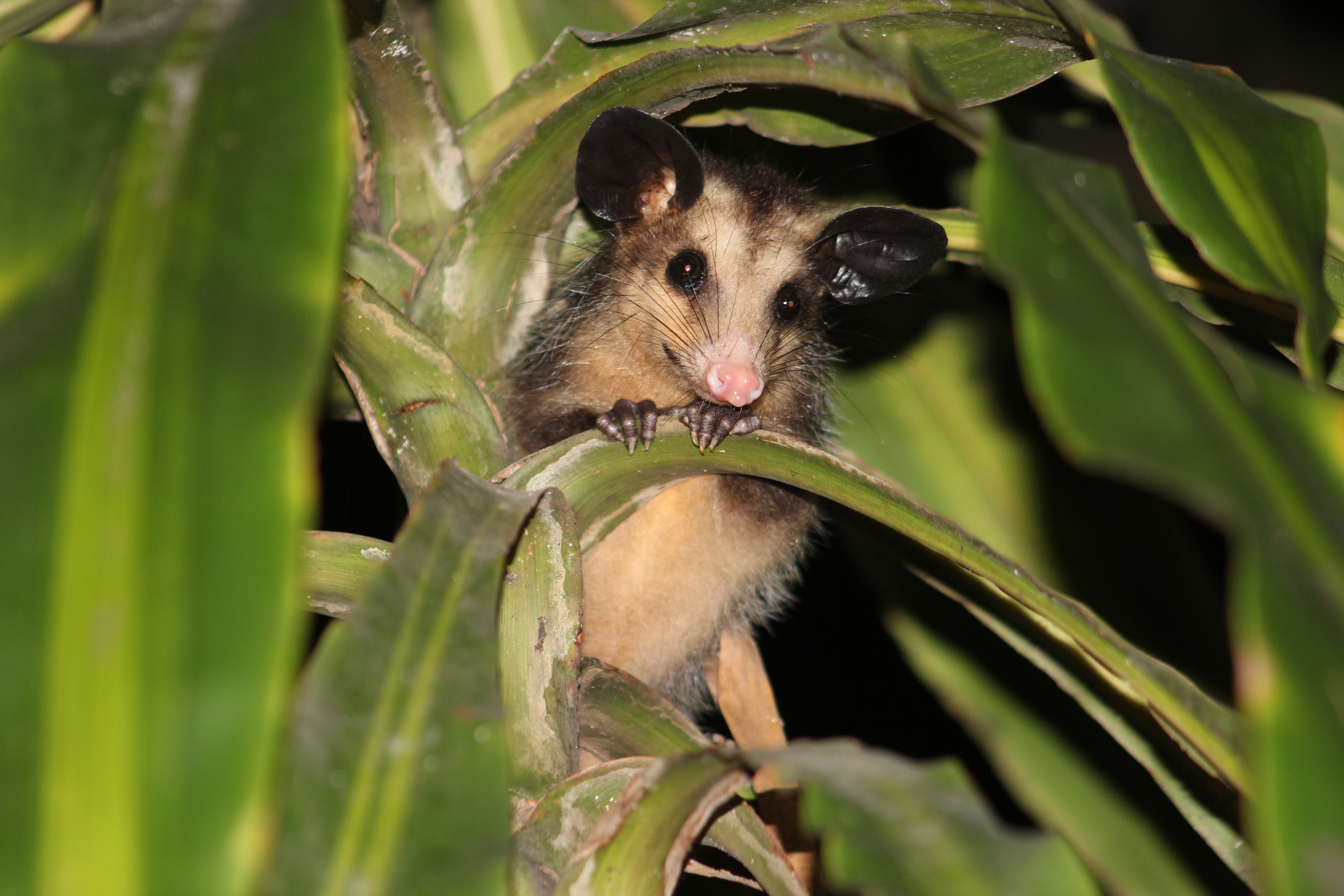
Didelphis aurita

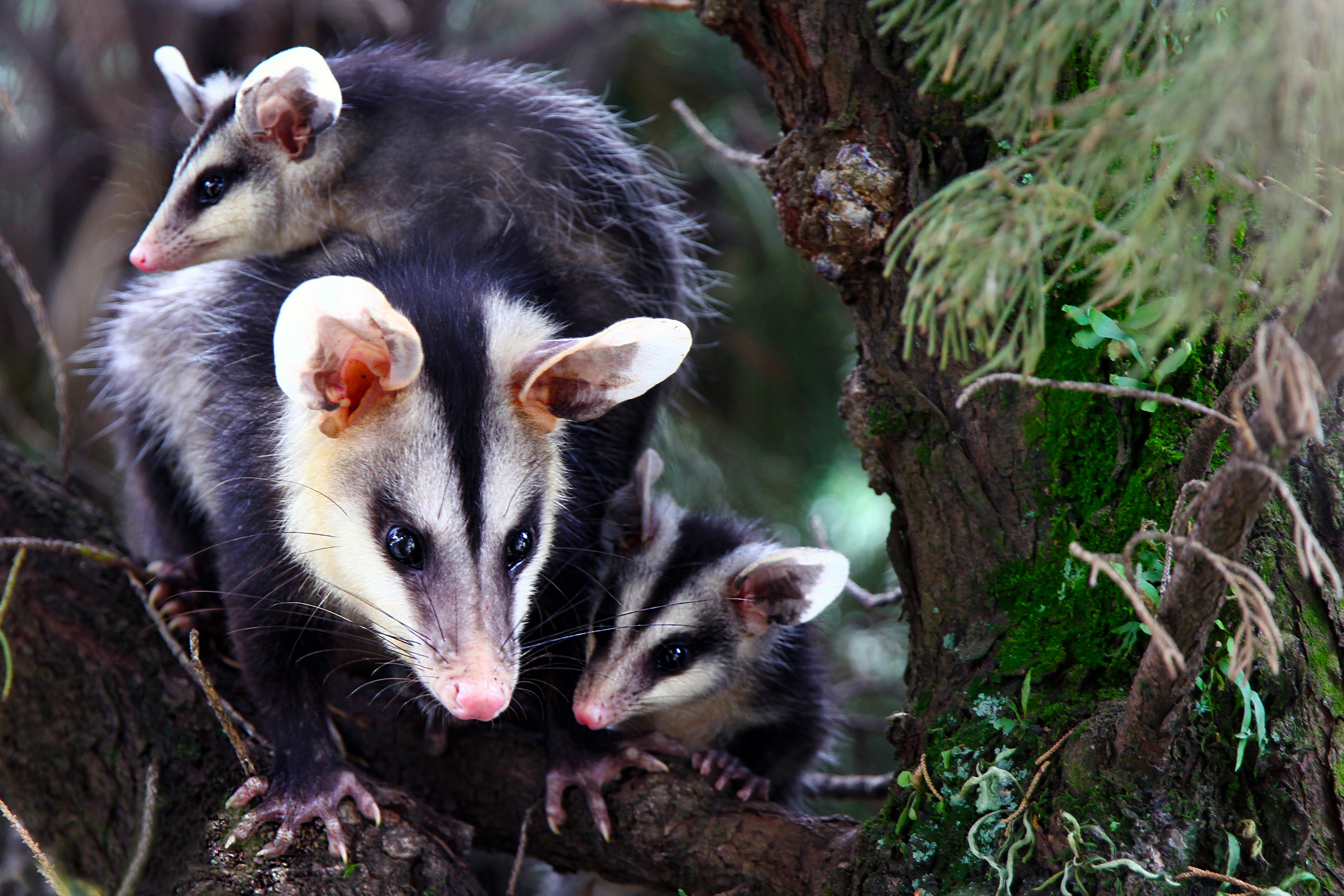
Didelphis albiventris

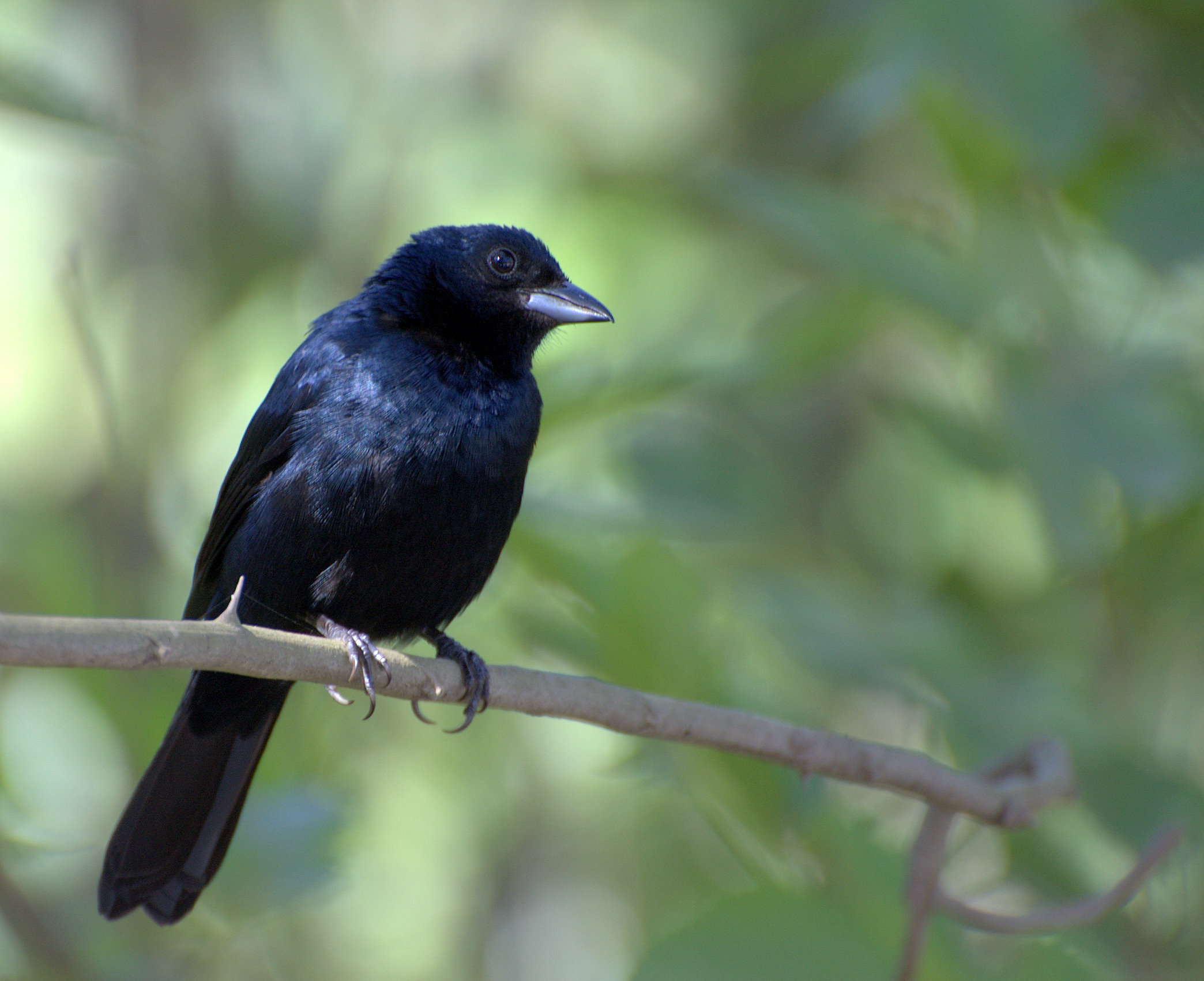
Tachyphonus coronatus
