= Corynaea =

Corynaea is the scientific name of two genera of organisms and may refer to:

- Corynaea (moth), a genus of insects in the family Gelechiidae
- Corynaea (plant), a genus of plants in the family Balanophoraceae
