= Ataenius columbicus =

Scientific classification
- Kingdom: Animalia
- Phylum: Arthropoda
- Clade: Pancrustacea
- Class: Insecta
- Order: Coleoptera
- Suborder: Polyphaga
- Infraorder: Scarabaeiformia
- Family: Scarabaeidae
- Genus: Ataenius
- Species: A. columbicus

Binomial name
- Ataenius columbicus Harold, 1880

Synonyms
- Ataenius fastus Petrovitz, 1970; Ataenius laterigranosus Balthasar, 1947; Ataenius tesari Balthasar, 1947

Species of beetle

Ataenius columbicus is a species of beetle of the family Scarabaeidae. It is found in Argentina, Bolivia, Brazil (Bahia, Distrito Federal, Espírito Santo, Mato Grosso, Minas Gerais, Pará, Paraná, Rio de Janeiro, Rio Grande do Sul, Santa Catarina, São Paulo), Colombia, French Guiana, Guyana, Panama, Paraguay, Peru, Suriname, Uruguay and Venezuela.

== Description ==
Adults reach a length of about 4.3–5.5 mm (0.17–0.22 in). They have a dark brown to piceous, more or less shining, subparallel-sided body.

== Life history ==
Specimens have been recorded from subtropical scrub forest, and have been found under logs,on Lophophytum plants, as well as in cattle dung.
