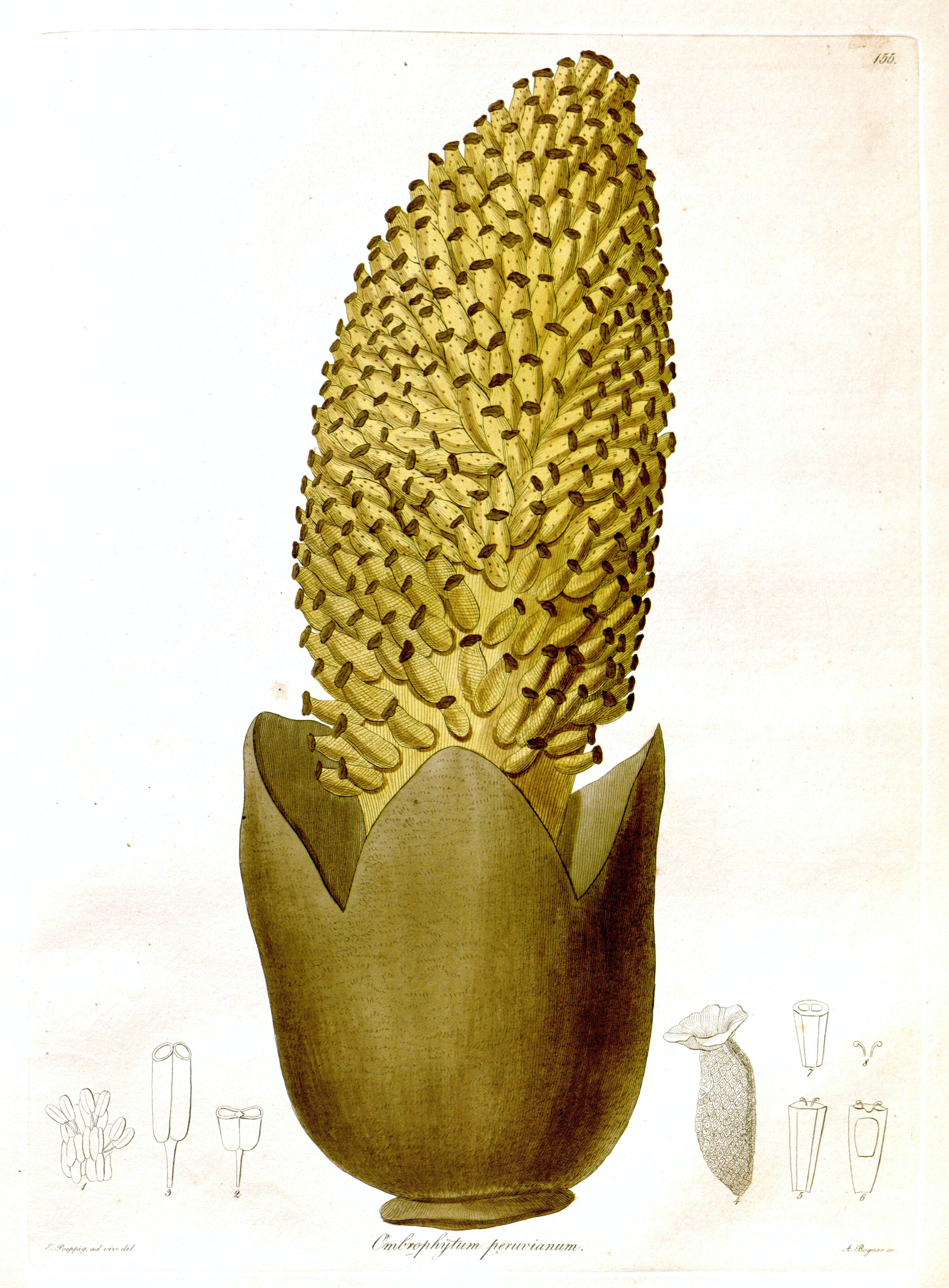
- Ombrophytum peruvianum

Scientific classification
- Kingdom: Plantae
- Clade: Tracheophytes
- Clade: Angiosperms
- Clade: Eudicots
- Order: Santalales
- Family: Balanophoraceae
- Genus: Ombrophytum; Poepp. ex Endl.

= Ombrophytum =

Genus of plants

Ombrophytum is a genus of flowering plants belonging to the family Balanophoraceae.

Its native range is Southern Tropical America.

== Species ==
Species:

- Ombrophytum chilensis Kuijt & Delprete
- Ombrophytum guayanense Delprete
- Ombrophytum microlepis B.Hansen
- Ombrophytum peruvianum Poepp. & Endl.
- Ombrophytum subterraneum (Aspl.) B.Hansen
- Ombrophytum villamariensis S.Guzm.-Guzm.
- Ombrophytum violaceum B.Hansen
