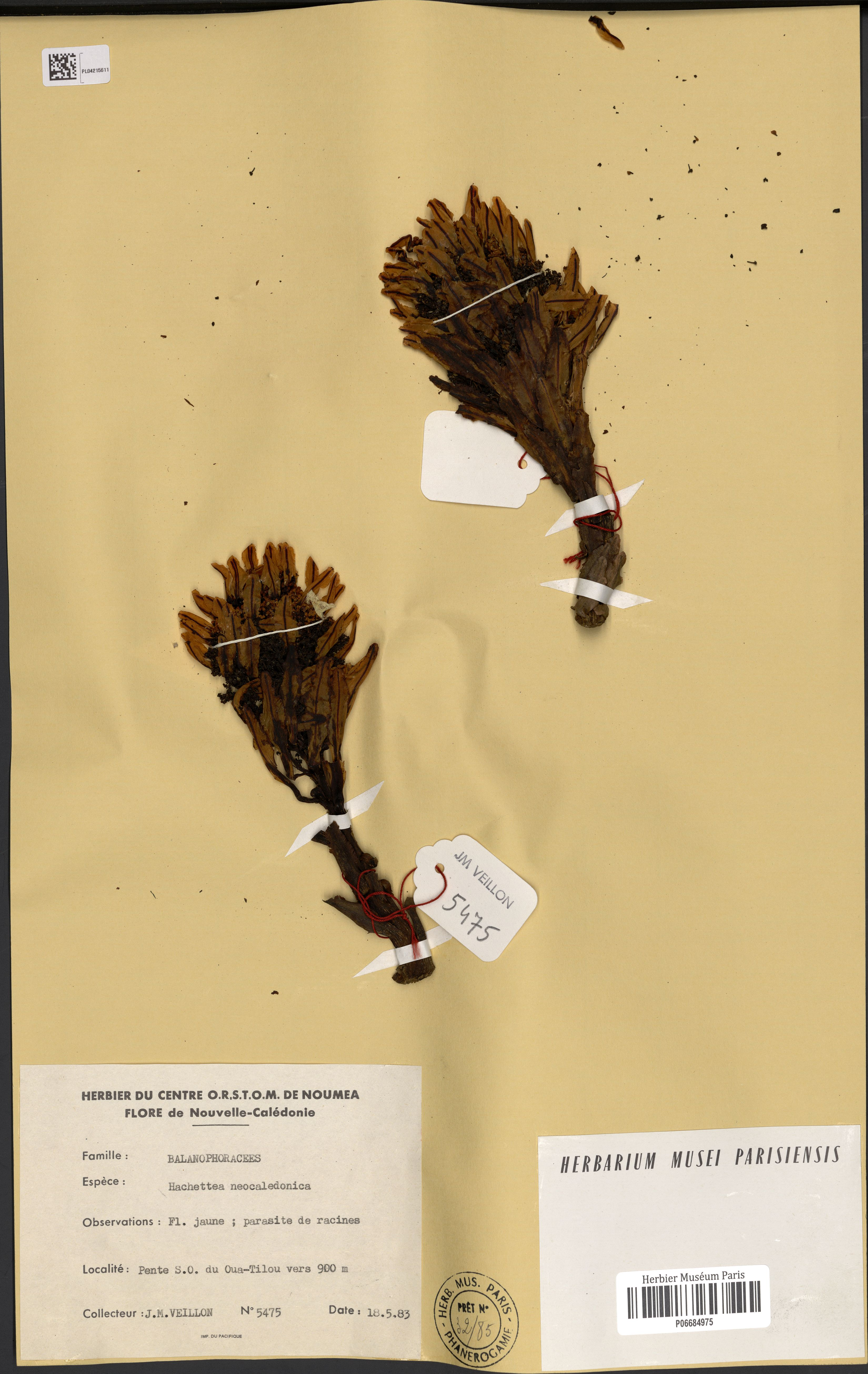

Scientific classification
- Kingdom: Plantae
- Clade: Tracheophytes
- Clade: Angiosperms
- Clade: Eudicots
- Order: Santalales
- Family: Balanophoraceae
- Genus: Hachettea; Baill.
- Species: H. austrocaledonica

Binomial name
- Hachettea austrocaledonica Baill.

= Hachettea =

Genus of flowering plants

Hachettea austrocaledonica is a species of parasitic plant in the Balanophoraceae family. It is endemic to New Caledonia and the only species of the genus Hachettea. Its closest relative is Dactylanthus from New Zealand. The host of Hachettea has yet to be confirmed in nature, but horizontally transferred Hachettea DNA in Amborella trichopoda suggests potential symbiotic relationship between these two species.
