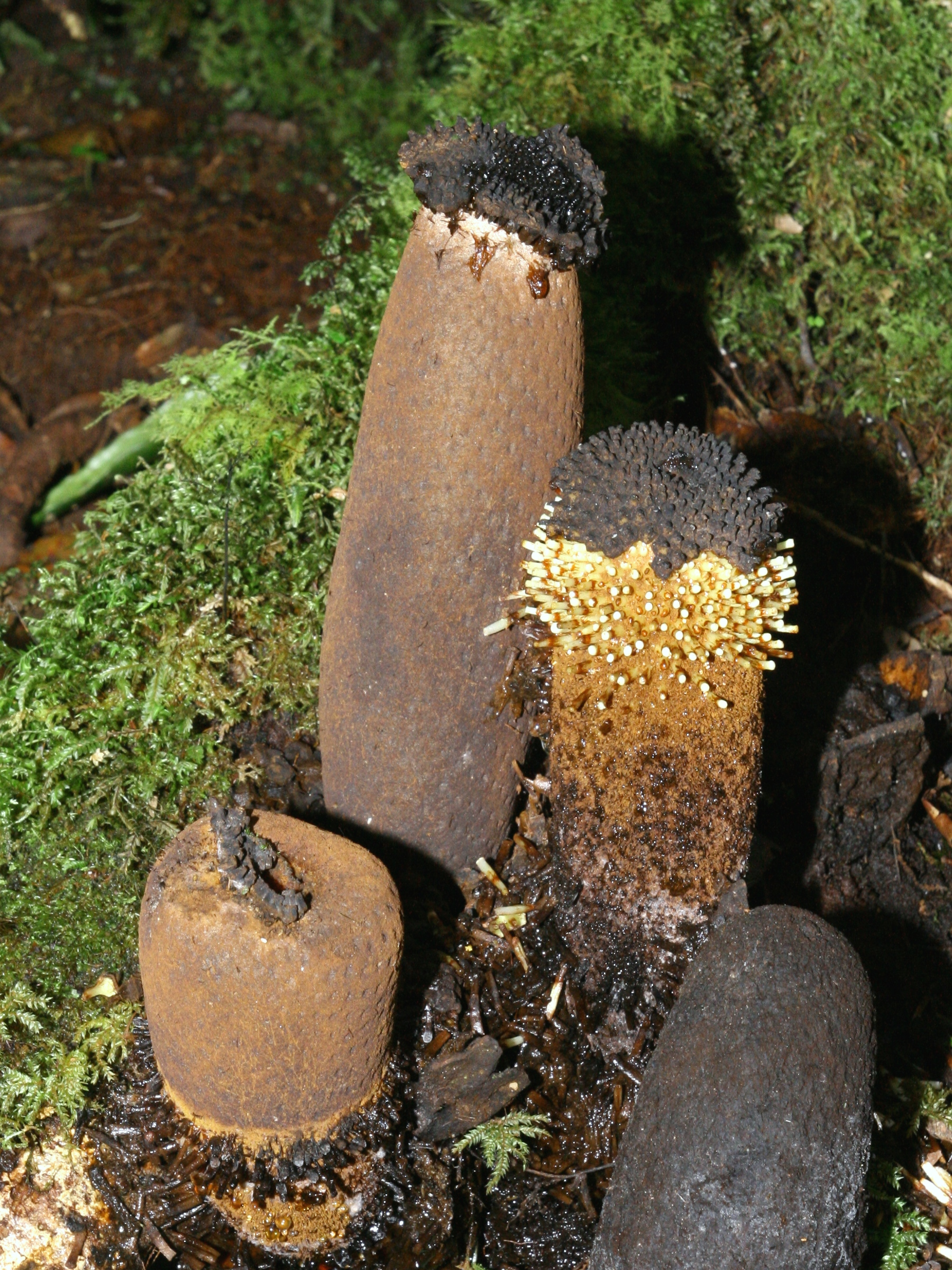
- Rhopalocnemis phalloides

Scientific classification
- Kingdom: Plantae
- Clade: Tracheophytes
- Clade: Angiosperms
- Clade: Eudicots
- Order: Santalales
- Family: Balanophoraceae
- Genus: Rhopalocnemis; Jungh.

= Rhopalocnemis =

Genus of flowering plants

Rhopalocnemis is a genus of flowering plants belonging to the family Balanophoraceae.

Its native range is Himalaya to Southern China and Malesia.

Species:

- Rhopalocnemis phalloides Jungh.
