= Chlamydophytum =

Scientific classification
- Kingdom: Plantae
- Clade: Tracheophytes
- Clade: Angiosperms
- Clade: Eudicots
- Order: Santalales
- Family: Balanophoraceae
- Genus: Chlamydophytum; Mildbr.

Genus of flowering plants

Chlamydophytum is a genus of flowering plants belonging to the family Balanophoraceae.

Its native range is Western Central Tropical Africa.

Species:

- Chlamydophytum aphyllum Mildbr.
