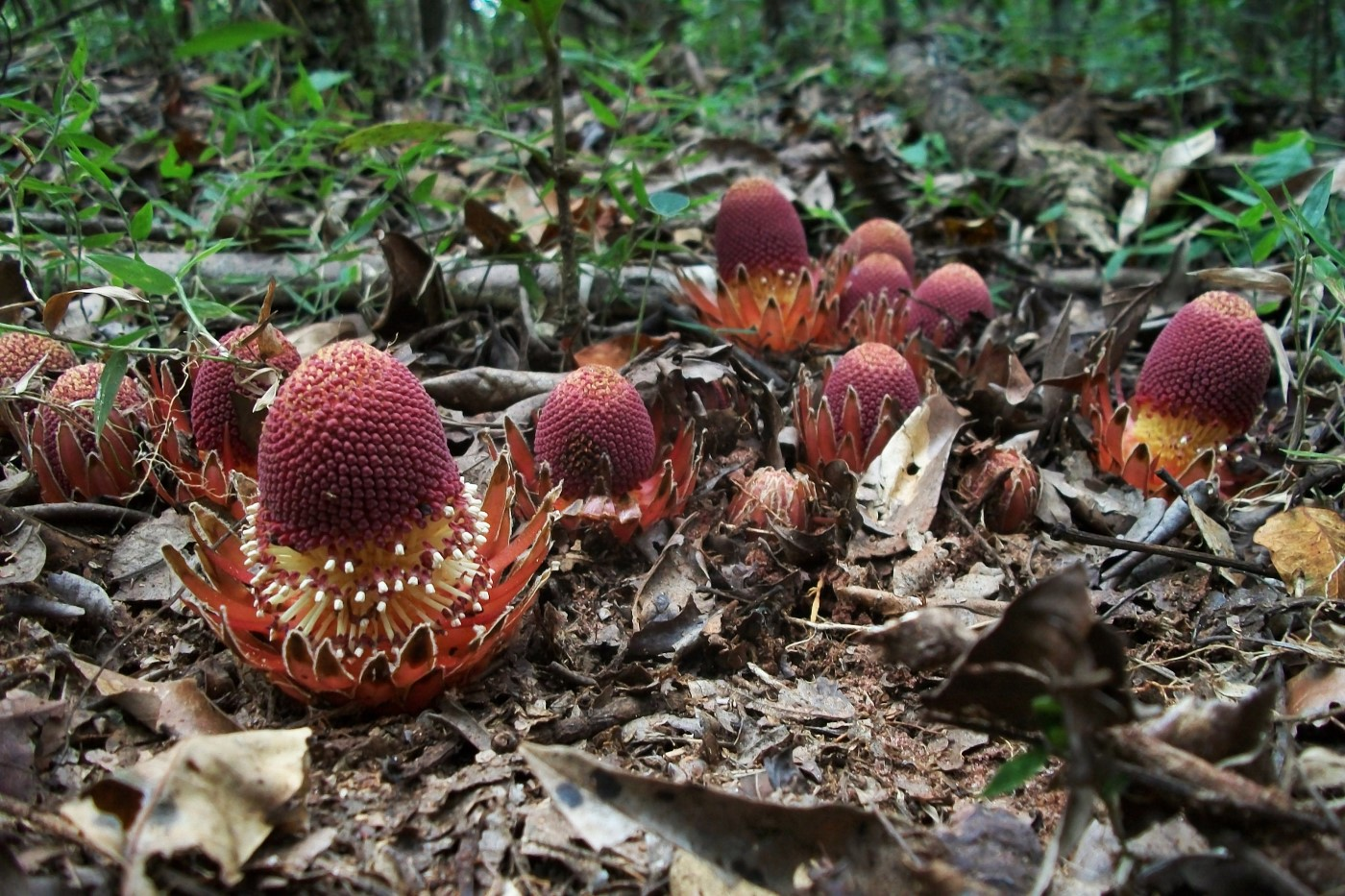
- Langsdorffia hypogaea

Scientific classification
- Kingdom: Plantae
- Clade: Tracheophytes
- Clade: Angiosperms
- Clade: Eudicots
- Order: Santalales
- Family: Balanophoraceae
- Genus: Langsdorffia; Mart.

Species
- See text

Synonyms
- Senftenbergia Klotzsch & H.Karst.

= Langsdorffia =

Genus of Balanophoraceae plants

Langsdorffia are a genus of flowering plants in the family Balanophoraceae, native to Central America, South America, Madagascar and New Guinea. They are parasites on the roots of other plants, with no chlorophyll or stomata of their own.

== Species ==
Currently accepted species include:

- Langsdorffia heterotepala L.J.T.Cardoso, R.J.V.Alves & J.M.A.Braga
- Langsdorffia hypogaea Mart.
- Langsdorffia malagasica (Fawc.) B.Hansen
- Langsdorffia papuana R.Geesink
