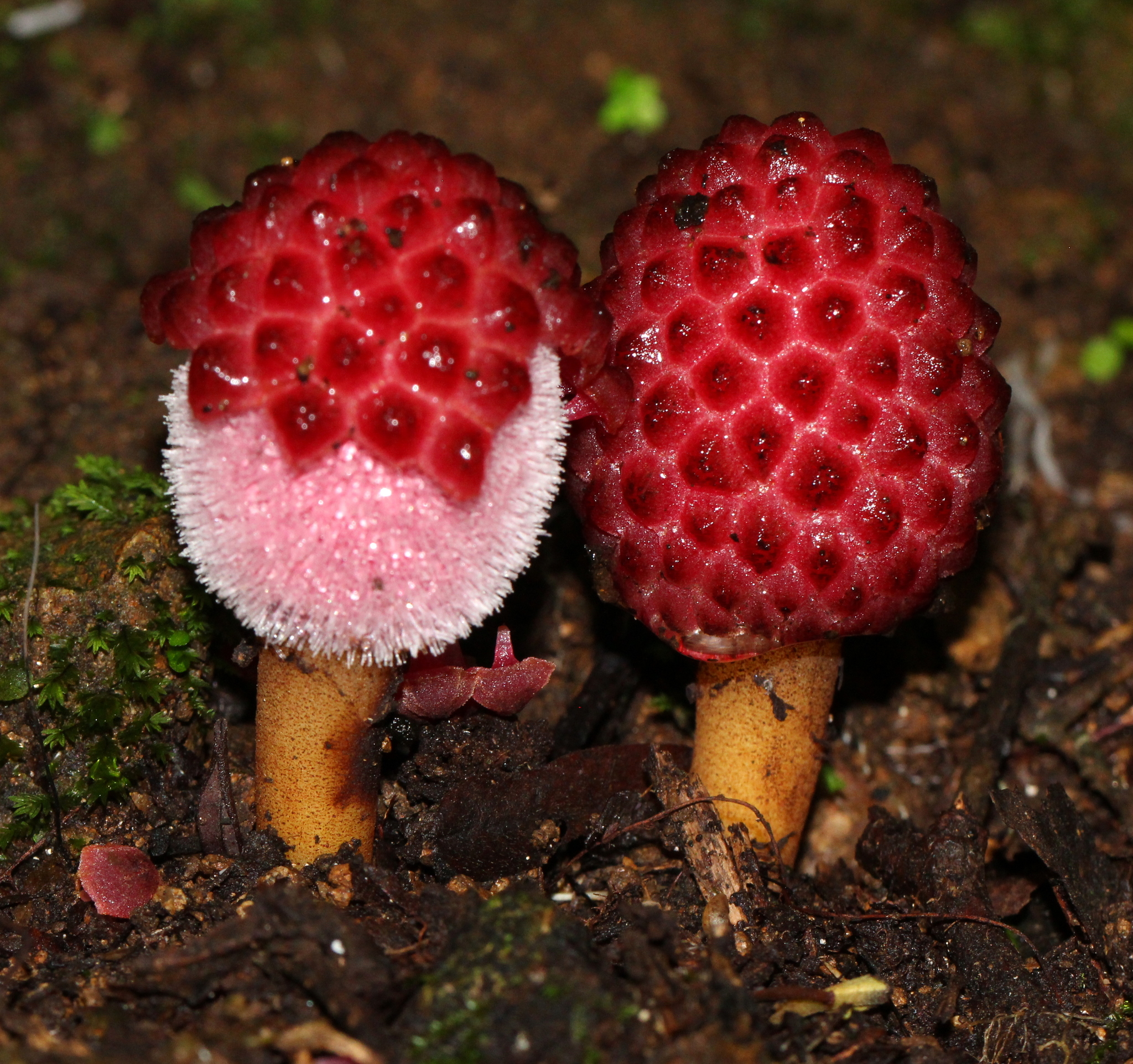
- Helosis cayennensis

Scientific classification
- Kingdom: Plantae
- Clade: Embryophytes
- Clade: Tracheophytes
- Clade: Angiosperms
- Clade: Eudicots
- Order: Santalales
- Family: Balanophoraceae
- Genus: Helosis; Rich.

= Helosis =

Genus of plants

Helosis is a genus of flowering plants belonging to the family Balanophoraceae.

Its native range is Peninsular Malaysia, Mexico to Tropical America.

Species:

- Helosis antillensis L.J.T.Cardoso & J.M.A.Braga
- Helosis cayennensis (Sw.) Spreng.
- Helosis ruficeps (Ridl.) Eberwein
