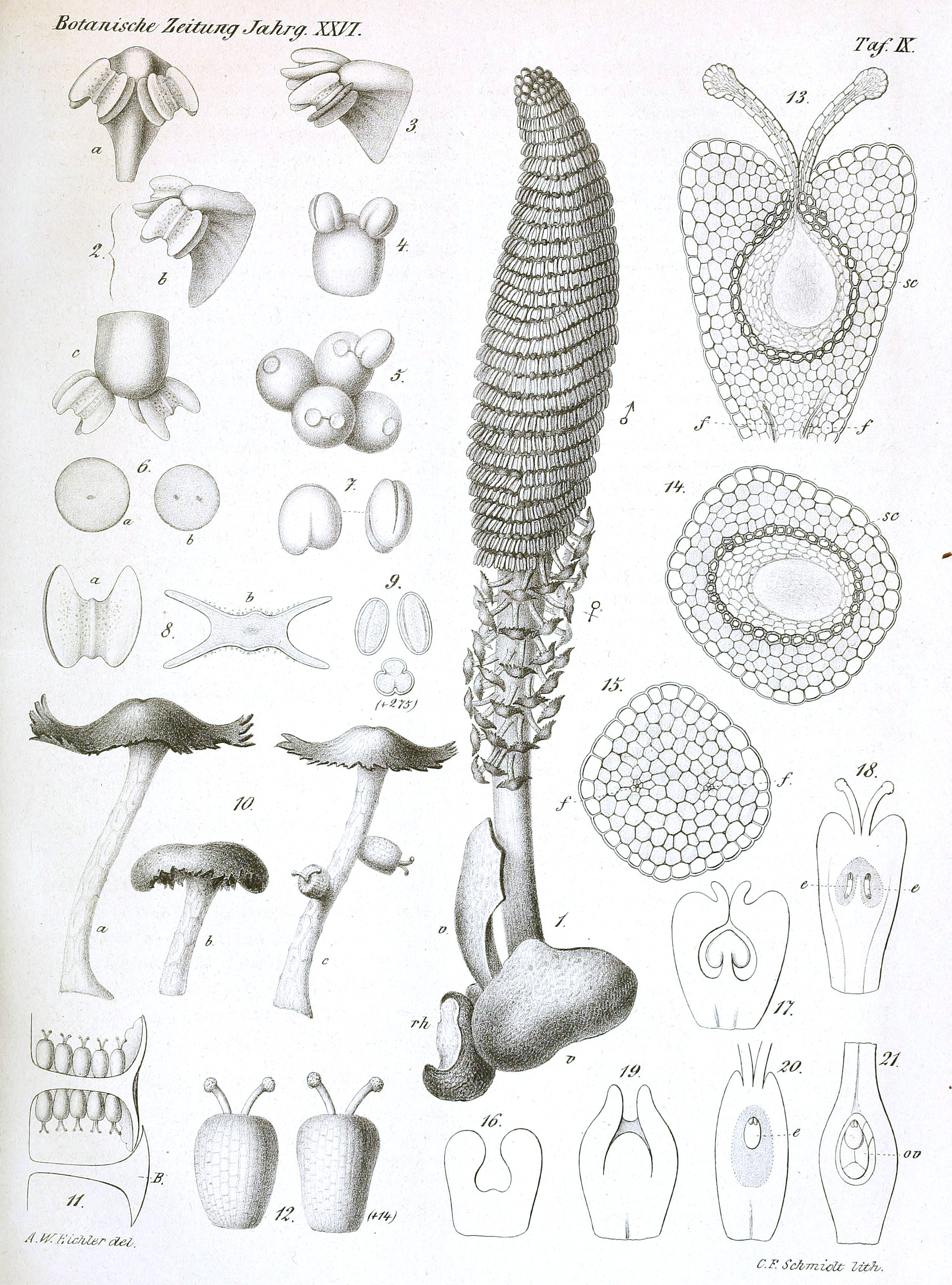
- Lathrophytum peckoltii 1868

Scientific classification
- Kingdom: Plantae
- Clade: Tracheophytes
- Clade: Angiosperms
- Clade: Eudicots
- Order: Santalales
- Family: Balanophoraceae
- Genus: Lathrophytum; Eichler
- Species: L. peckoltii

Binomial name
- Lathrophytum peckoltii Eichler

= Lathrophytum =

Genus of flowering plants

Lathrophytum is a monotypic genus of flowering plants belonging to the family Balanophoraceae. The only species is Lathrophytum peckoltii.

The species is found in Costa Rica, Brazil.
