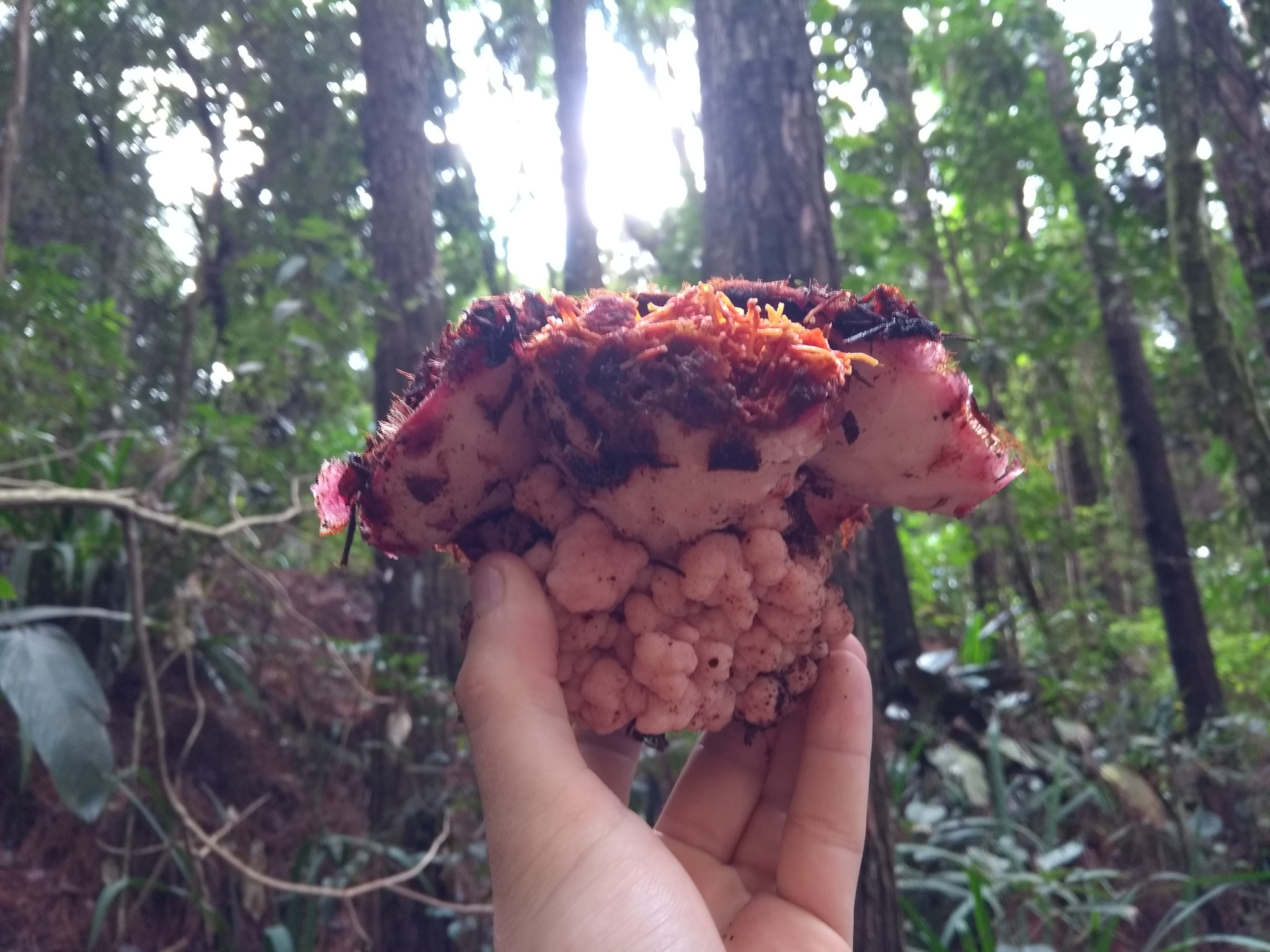
- Scybalium fungiforme

Scientific classification
- Kingdom: Plantae
- Clade: Tracheophytes
- Clade: Angiosperms
- Clade: Eudicots
- Order: Santalales
- Family: Balanophoraceae
- Genus: Scybalium; Schott & Endl.

= Scybalium =

Genus of plants

Scybalium is a genus of flowering plants belonging to the family Balanophoraceae.

Its native range is Caribbean, Western South America to Brazil.

Species:

- Scybalium depressum (Hook.f.) Eichler
- Scybalium fungiforme Schott & Endl.
- Scybalium glaziovii Eichler
- Scybalium jamaicense (Sw.) Schott & Endl.
