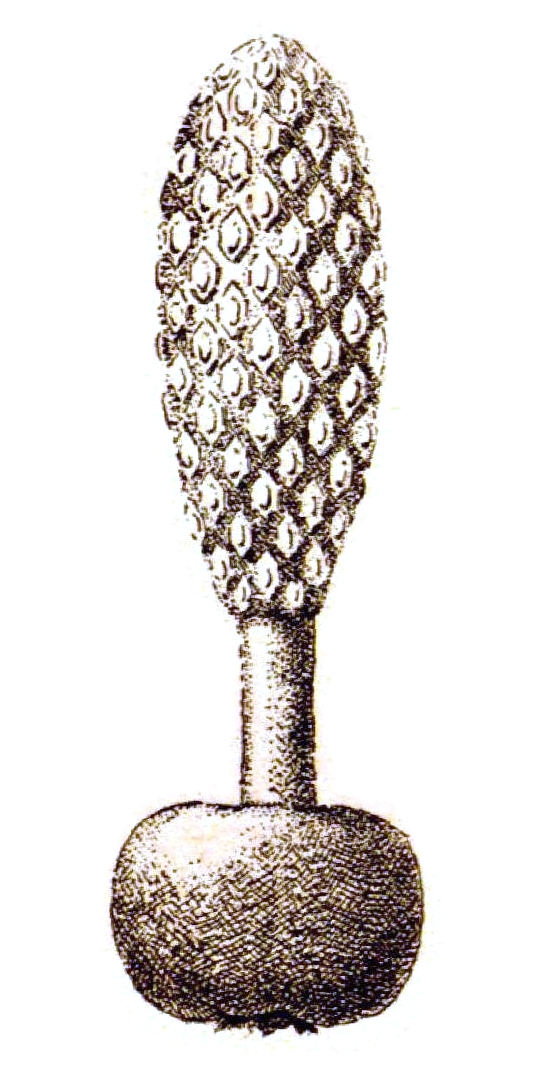
- Ditepalanthus malagasicus sketch circa 1912

Scientific classification
- Kingdom: Plantae
- Clade: Tracheophytes
- Clade: Angiosperms
- Clade: Eudicots
- Order: Santalales
- Family: Balanophoraceae
- Genus: Ditepalanthus; Fagerl.

= Ditepalanthus =

Genus of plants

Ditepalanthus is a genus of flowering plants belonging to the family Balanophoraceae.

Its native range is Madagascar.

Species:

- Ditepalanthus afzelii Fagerl.
- Ditepalanthus malagasicus (Jum. & H.Perrier) Fagerl.
