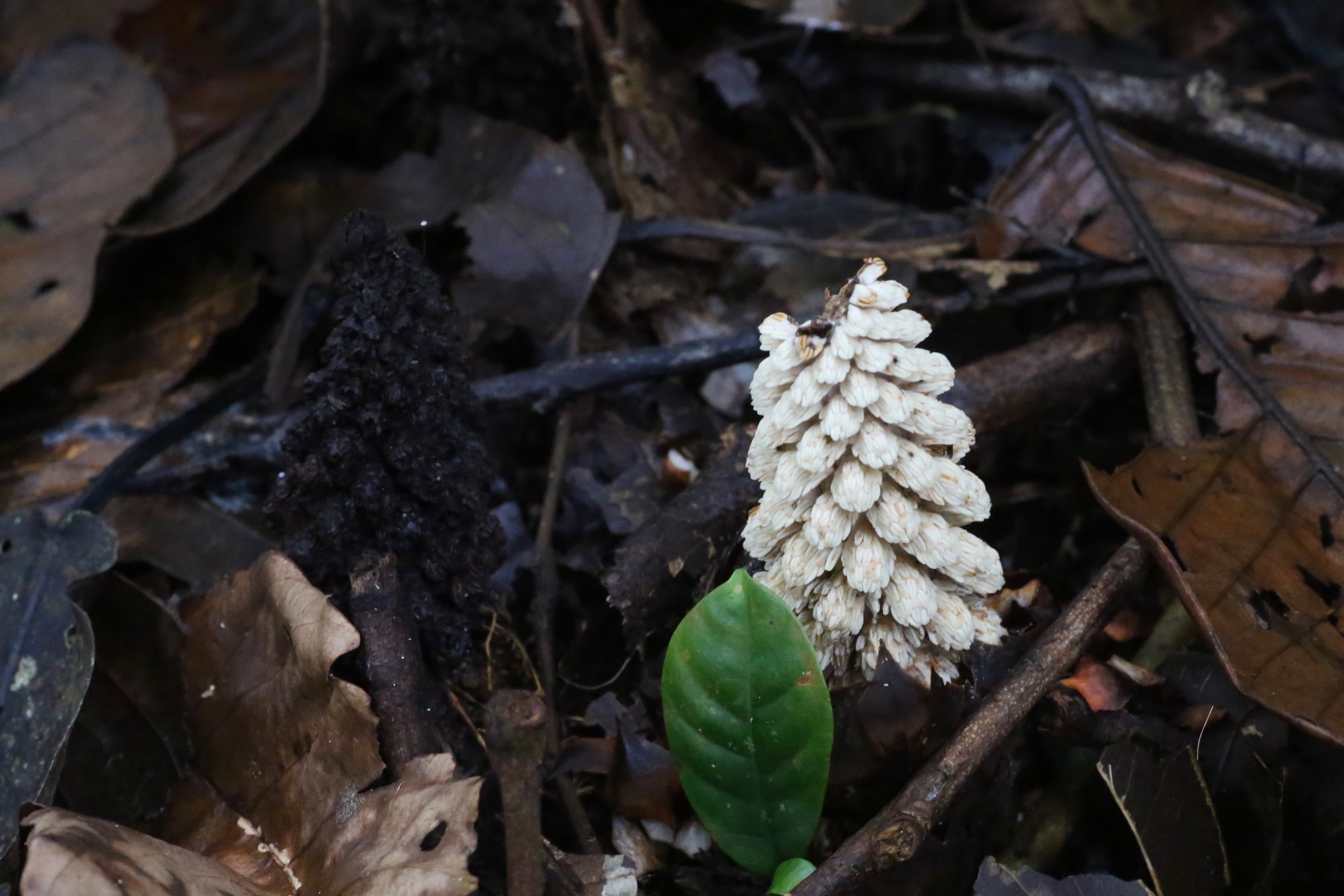
- Lophophytum mirabile

Scientific classification
- Kingdom: Plantae
- Clade: Embryophytes
- Clade: Tracheophytes
- Clade: Angiosperms
- Clade: Eudicots
- Order: Santalales
- Family: Balanophoraceae
- Genus: Lophophytum; Schott & Endl.

= Lophophytum =

Genus of plants

Lophophytum is a genus of parasitic plants belonging to the family Balanophoraceae.

Its native range is Western South America to Brazil and Northern Argentina.

Like all species of Lophophytum, L. mirabile is a root holoparasite: it does not photosynthesize and takes its nutrients via vascular connection to a host plant, using an organ called a haustorium.

Species:

- Lophophytum mirabile Schott & Endl.
- Lophophytum pyramidale (Leandro) L.J.T.Cardoso & J.M.A.Braga
- Lophophytum rizzoi Delprete
- Lophophytum weddelii Hook.f.

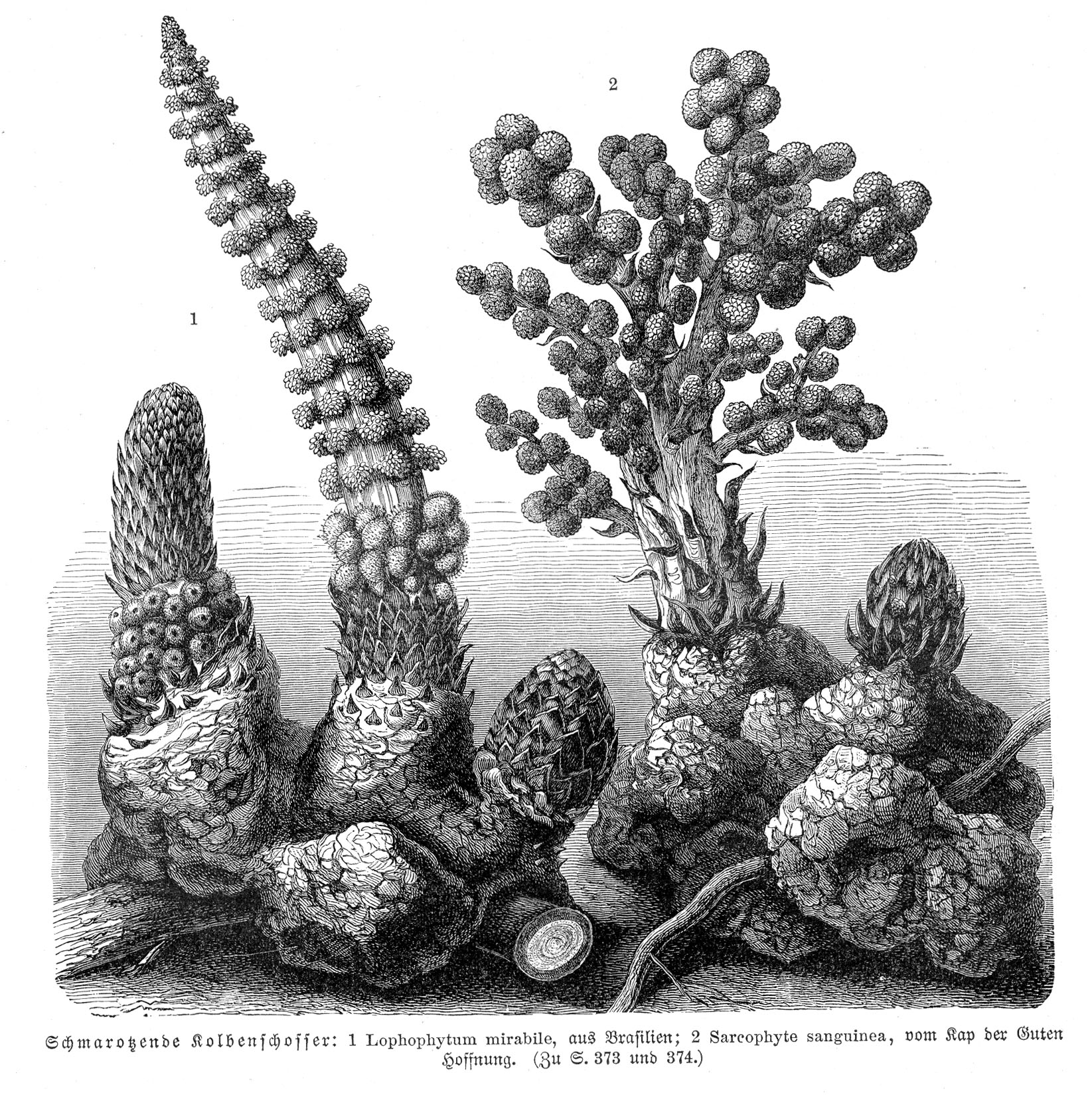
Lophophytum with Sarcophyte
