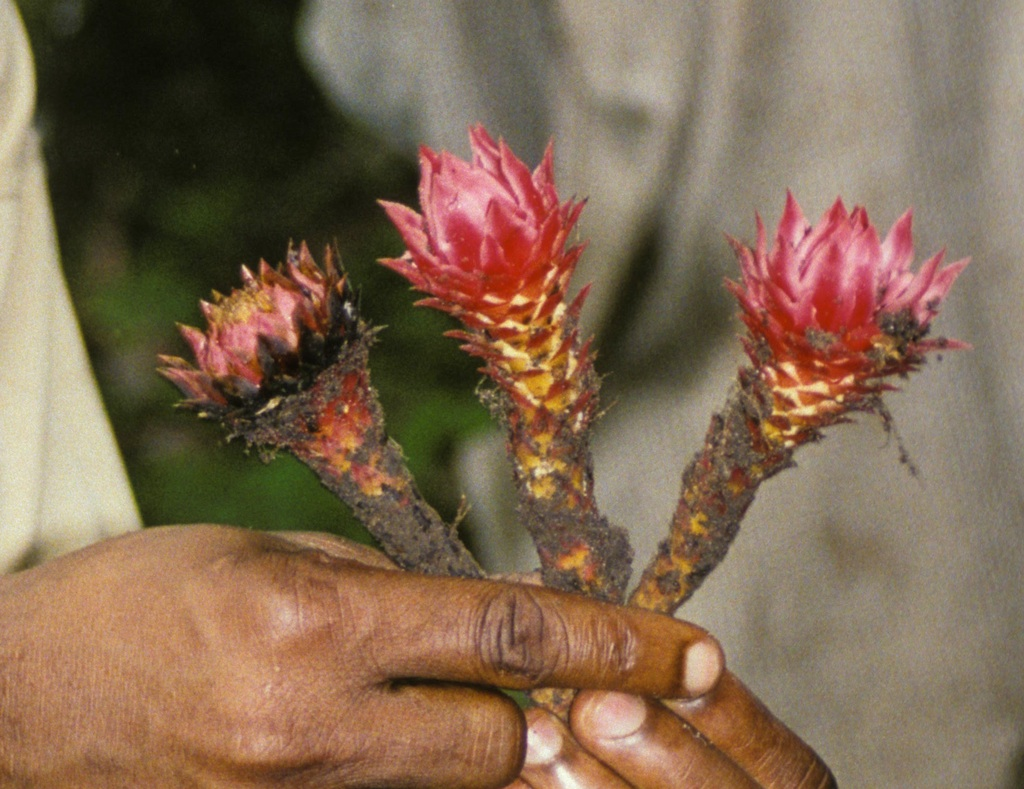

Scientific classification
- Kingdom: Plantae
- Clade: Tracheophytes
- Clade: Angiosperms
- Clade: Eudicots
- Order: Santalales
- Family: Balanophoraceae
- Genus: Thonningia; Vahl
- Species: T. sanguinea

Binomial name
- Thonningia sanguinea Vahl

Synonyms
- Thonningia coccinea Thonningia dubia Thonningia elegans

= Thonningia =

Genus of flowering plants

Thonningia is a monotypic genus of flowering plants in the family Balanophoraceae containing the single species Thonningia sanguinea. It is distributed throughout much of southern and western Africa, particularly the tropical regions. Common names for the plant include ground pineapple. A familiar plant to humans, it has an extremely long list of common names in many African languages. Many names are inspired by the resemblance of the plant's inflorescence to a pineapple or palm tree. Some of the names can be translated as pineapple of the bush (from Anyi), duiker's kolanut (from Igala), and crown of the ground (from Yoruba).

== Description ==
This species is a fleshy dioecious herb growing from an underground tuber. It is parasitic on other plants via its tuber. The branching, yellowish tuber extends horizontally up to 10 or 15 centimeters through the soil. It forms bulb-like swellings at the points where it attaches to the roots of its host plants. These swellings, or galls, can reach over 18 centimeters wide. The tuber can resemble a rhizome, but there is no true rhizome. The stem is coated with spirals of scale-like leaves. The leaves are not green; there is no chlorophyll, as the plant obtains nutrients from hosts and does not need to photosynthesize. The flowering stem emerges from the ground to produce a bright red or pink inflorescence containing male and female flowers. The crowded flower heads are covered in scales. The inflorescence is up to 15 to 20 centimeters long.

== Habitat, distribution, and ecology ==
This plant grows in forests and other habitat. It can often be found in plantations, where it parasitizes such crop trees as Hevea brasiliensis (rubber), Phoenix dactylifera (date), and Theobroma cacao (cocoa).

This species is pollinated by flies and ants. Flies of the families Muscidae and Calliphoridae and ants of genus Technomyrmex visit the flowers to obtain nectar, pollinating the flowers as they enter. Muscid flies of genus Morellia lay eggs in the flowers and the larvae feed on the male flowers when they emerge. This could be an example of mutualism; as the fly pollinates the plant, it provides a site for egg-laying and nutrition for the larvae.

== Uses ==
The plant is used as a traditional remedy in many African cultures. This includes in those with sexually transmitted diseases in Ghana. In those with diarrhea in the Congo. A portion of the leaves is used in those with worms. Mixed with Capsicum, it is used topically on hemorrhoids and torticollis. It is used for leprosy, skin infections and abscesses, dental caries, gingivitis, and heart disease. In Zaire, it is said to prevent incontinence and bedwetting.

The other uses for the plant include as an ingredient in the poison applied to hunting arrows by peoples of Côte d'Ivoire. It is also known as a flavoring for soup. In some areas, the flower heads are considered to be an aphrodisiac. In Ghana and Côte d'Ivoire, the spiky flower heads are tied to the ankles of toddlers to encourage them to learn to walk; the spikes keep them from sitting down. All parts of the plant are used.

The plant is considered a weed in some places, such as rubber plantations, where it can become abundant.
