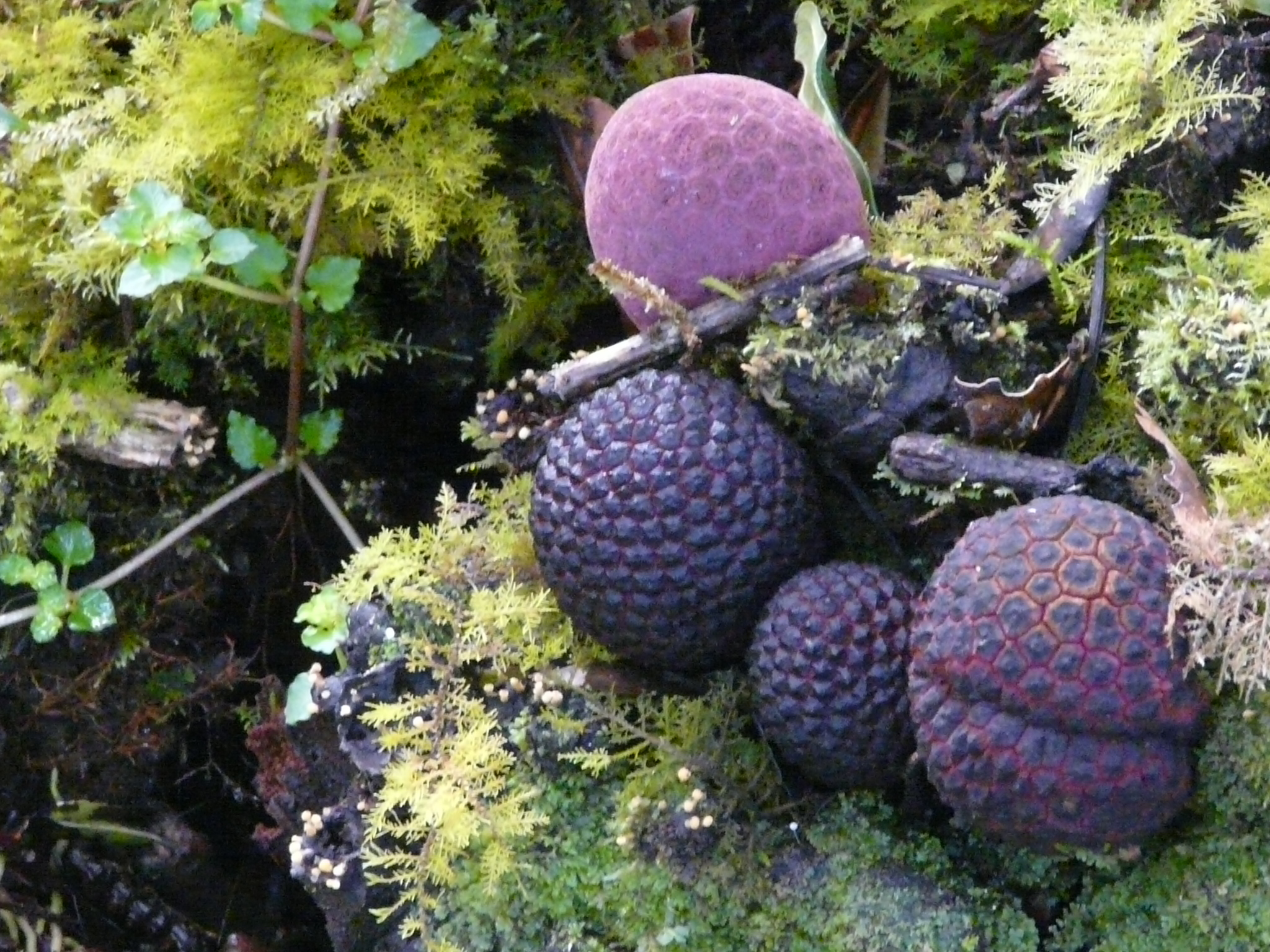

Scientific classification
- Kingdom: Plantae
- Clade: Tracheophytes
- Clade: Angiosperms
- Clade: Eudicots
- Order: Santalales
- Family: Balanophoraceae
- Genus: Corynaea; Hook.f.
- Species: C. crassa

Binomial name
- Corynaea crassa Hook.f.

Synonyms
- Corynabutilon crassa Hook.f. Corynabutilon sphaerica Hook.f. Corynaea purdiei Hook.fil. Corynaea sphaerica Hook.fil. Itoasia crassa (Hook.f.) Kuntze; Itoasia purdiaei (Hook.fil.) Kuntze; Itoasia sphaerica (Hook.fil.) Kuntze

= Corynaea crassa =

Genus of plant

Corynaea crassa, commonly known as Peruvian Viagra or huanarpo macho is a species of parasitic flowering plant in the family Balanophoraceae found in South and Central America. Described in 1856 by Joseph Dalton Hooker, it is the sole member of the monotypic genus Corynaea.

It is not specialized for a single host species, with a broad variety of plant species that can serve as a host. Across its broad distribution, it has been known to parasitize at least four separate families of plants and grow in association with various other plants depending on its location. Consisting of a single underground haustorial tuber which is physically connected to the host plant, the inflorescences emerge from the ground seasonally. In Peru, its tubers often find use in the context of folk medicine as an anti-inflammatory and aphrodisiac.

== Taxonomy ==
First described by Joseph Dalton Hooker in 1856, its initial description was published in Transactions of the Linnean Society of London. It was originally split into three separate species under Hooker's classification, C. crassa being described from Nova Granada, C. sphaerica being listed as "Ibid.", or same as the previous, and C. purdiei being described from Peru. These names later became synonyms for C. crassa under the monotypic genus Corynaea, as its sole member.

It is commonly known in English as "Peruvian Viagra", with the local name in Peru being Huanarpo macho, translating to "huanarpo male". This name of Huanarpo macho is shared with the unrelated Jatropha macrantha. These names directly contrast with the colloquial name of Cnidoscolus peruvianus, Huanarpo hembra, which serves as a female aphrodisiac. The colloquial names given to C. crassa refers to its alleged properties as an aphrodisiac for men.

Two varieties are currently recognized:

- Corynaea crassa var. crassa Hook.f.
- Corynaea crassa var. sprucei (Eichler) B.Hansen

== Description ==
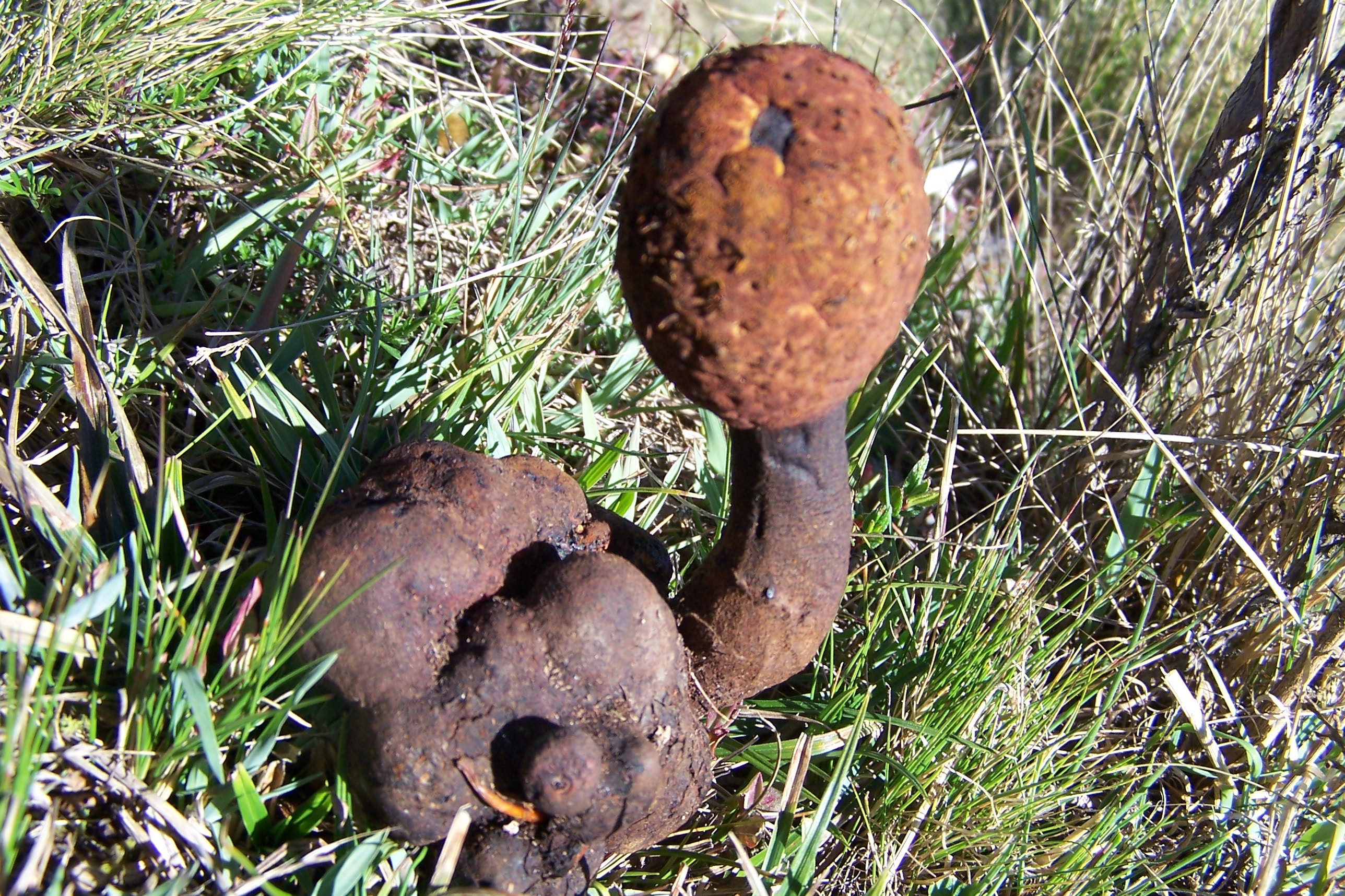
Corynaea crassa showing an exposed haustorial tuber and inflorescence

Corynaea crassa is a root hemiparasite of a broad variety of plants, thus requiring no sunlight to gather nutrients and lacking leaves. The vegetative body of the plant, and akin other members of the family Balanophoraceae, consist of an accretion of plant tissue known as a haustorial tuber. It is this haustorial tuber where the inflorescences of the plant develop from. The size of the haustorial tuber is directly correlated to the diameter of the host root from which the tuber derives its nutrients. In addition, the number of inflorescences the tuber produces is directly correlated to the diameter of the tuber itself. The emergence of the inflorescence is seasonal. The individual flowers are pollinated by insects of the orders Hymenoptera and Diptera. The rhizome of C. crassa is irregular in shape, with multiple lobes. It turns a rusty color when dried. The inflorescence is typically pink in color, ranging between a yellowish-brown to an intense purple, with the peduncle, or stalk of the plant, having an irregular short and lobed sheath at its base and having a length of 1.5–2.5 centimetres (0.59–0.98 in). The flower head is globose in shape, tapering to become fusiform in shape. The flower heads have a length of between 2–4 centimetres (0.79–1.57 in) and a diameter of between 1.5–2.0 centimetres (0.59–0.79 in). The individual fruits are obovoid, or egg shape, and around 1.5 millimetres (0.059 in) in length and 1 millimetre (0.039 in) in width.

Host plants include: Bocconia frutescens, Cayaponia sp., Palicourea sp., and Verbesina sp. in a study conducted in Costa Rica. With B. fructescens being the most commonly parasitized amongst the species studied, with 79.4 percent of the total tubers found. Another source notes Myrcia as a host plant in Costa Rica. It has been additionally known to parasitize bamboo shoots and Eupatorium angulare. The genera of plants parasitized span at least four separate plant families: Asteraceae, Cucurbitaceae, Papaveraceae, and Rubiaceae. In Guaramacal, Venezuela, it has been found growing in association with Renealmia (Zingiberaceae), but its relationship with the plant is currently unknown.

== Human uses ==
Corynaea crassa is often used within Peruvian folk medicine as an aphrodisiac and as an anti-inflammatory. It has a strict use as a male aphrodisiac, and is thought to have anti-aphrodisiac properties if used by women. The tubers of the plant are often sold dry or in a powder form at markets. Ethanolic extracts from Corynaea crassa have shown biological activity against the bacteria Staphylococcus aureus. The Philippine Food and Drug Administration has listed an advisory for products containing C. crassa extracts, due to the presence of adulterated Tadalafil.

Chemical analysis of dried tubers through chromatography, steroid elucidation, and X-ray crystallography revealed a variety of compounds such as: anthocyanins, cardiotonics, flavonoids, tannins, triterpenes, and steroids, with a lack of alkaloids. The formation of the Triterpenes Lupenone with Β-amyrone and Lupeol with B-Amyrine in a 1:1 ratio that had been uncovered by the survey had never been observed prior. The individual compounds uncovered had been found in other plants with purported aphrodisiac properties. The chemical composition of the tuber can differ based on the host species, with differing hosts across its broad range contributing to different chemical compositions of tubers found in Peru and Ecuador.

== Ecology ==
=== Distribution ===
Corynaea crassa is found in South and Central America, specifically within the countries of Bolivia, Colombia, Costa Rica, Ecuador, Panama, Peru, and Venezuela.

Corynaea crassa is found in the Peruvian provinces of Amazonas, Cajamarca, Cusco, La Libertad, Lambayeque, and Pasco.

=== Habitat ===
Corynaea crassa inhabits primary forest and secondary forests, cloud forests, oak forests, and stream banks in its native range.

Corynaea crassa is found, in one specific locality in Colombia, to be located between elevations of 1,300 metres (4,300 ft) and 3,000 metres (9,800 ft). A separate locality in Volcán Barú, Panama, found the plants at between the elevations of 3,500–4,000 metres (11,500–13,100 ft). One estimate puts the elevation the plant can be found at around 1,250–3,600 metres (4,100–11,810 ft).

== Threats and conservation ==
Corynaea crassa is uncommon in its native range, due in part to its underground nature making sightings uncommon. One report described the species as "vulnerable". This is likely due in part to conversion of its native forest habitat into agricultural and pastoral land. Additional factors, specific to the parasitic nature of the plant, are due to its dependency onto a host plant. These include the quality of the host, resistance to parasitism by the host, and preferences of the parasite itself, can serve as factors as to why it is uncommon in its native range.

== Gallery ==
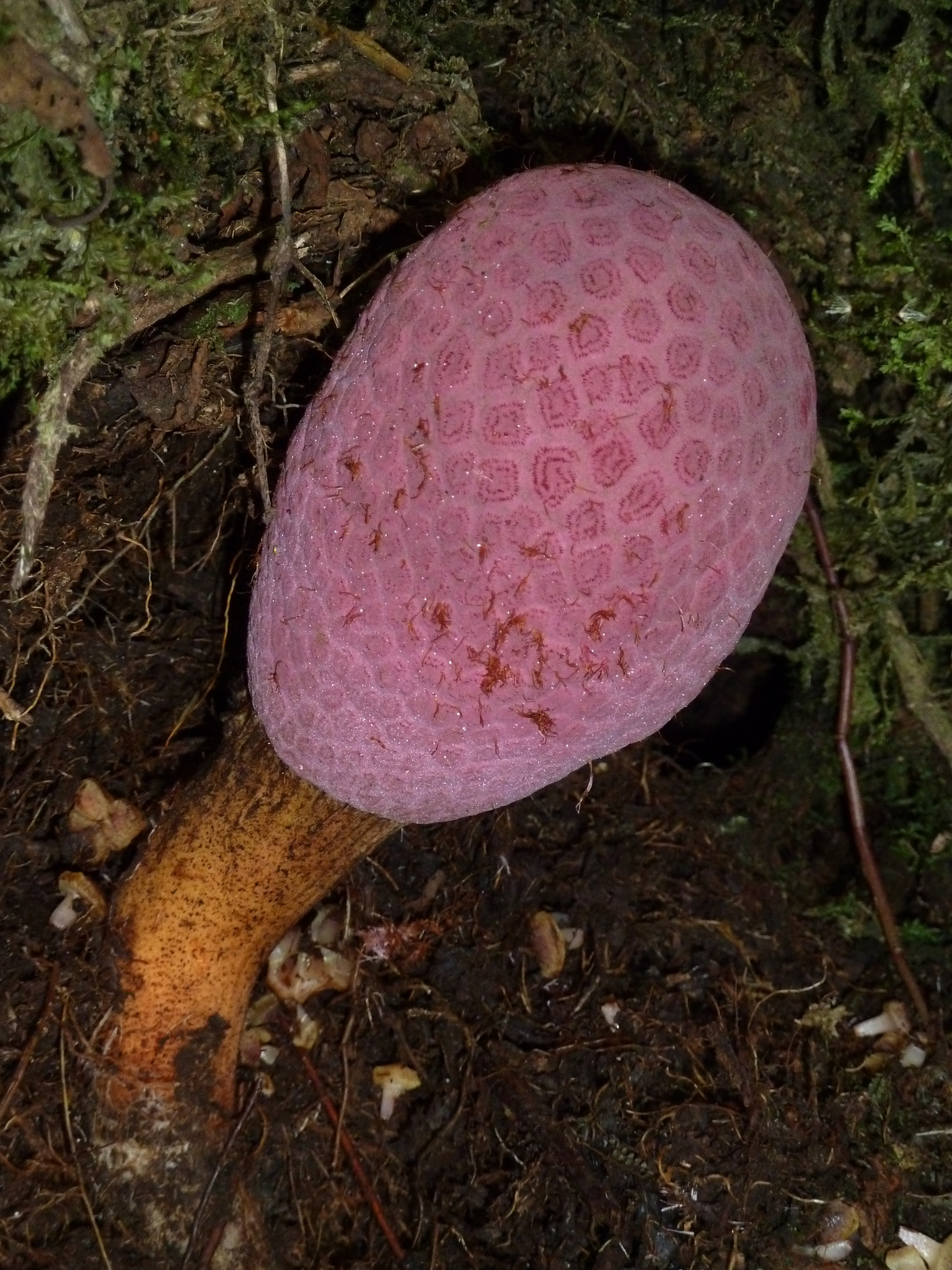

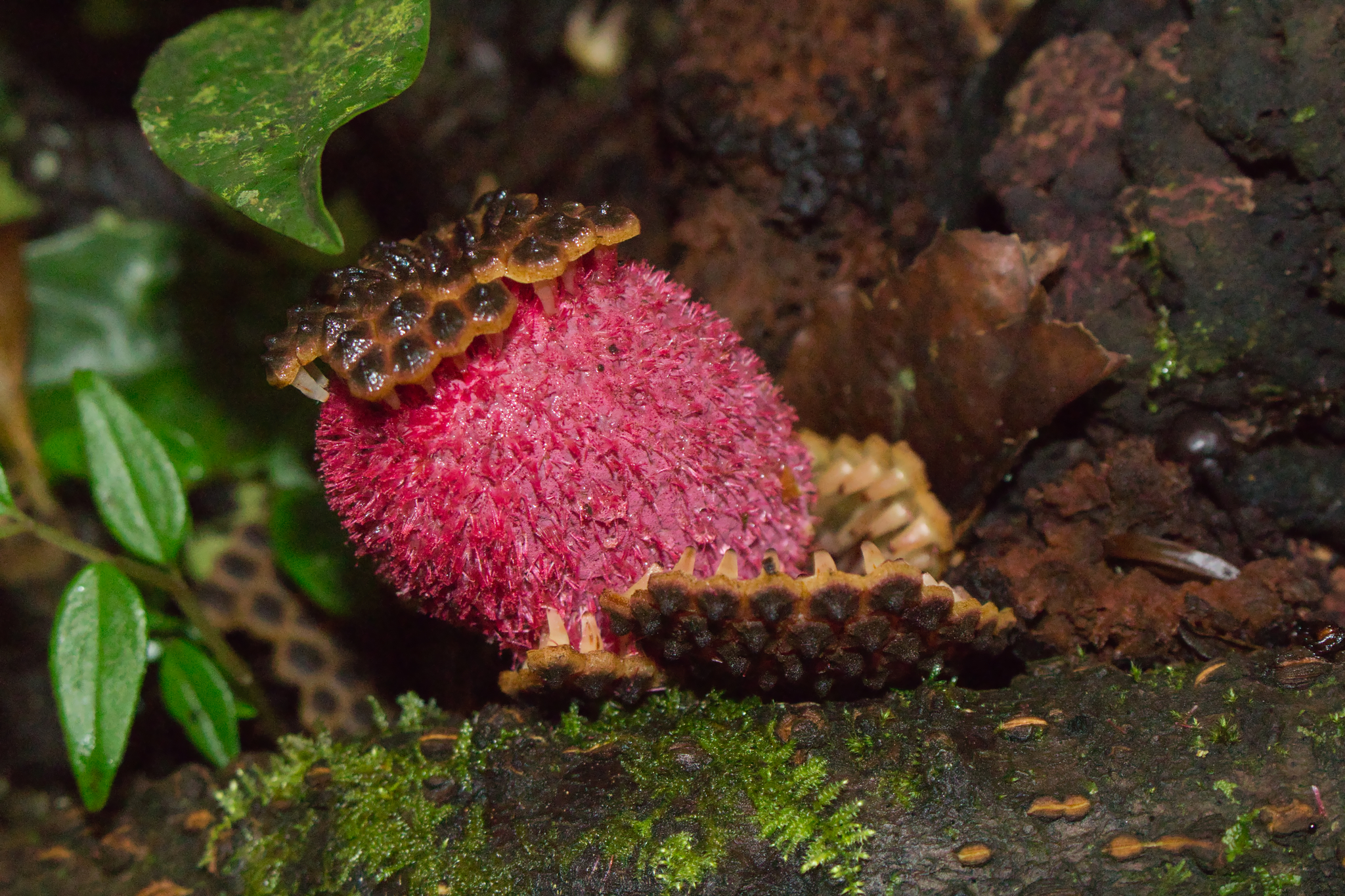

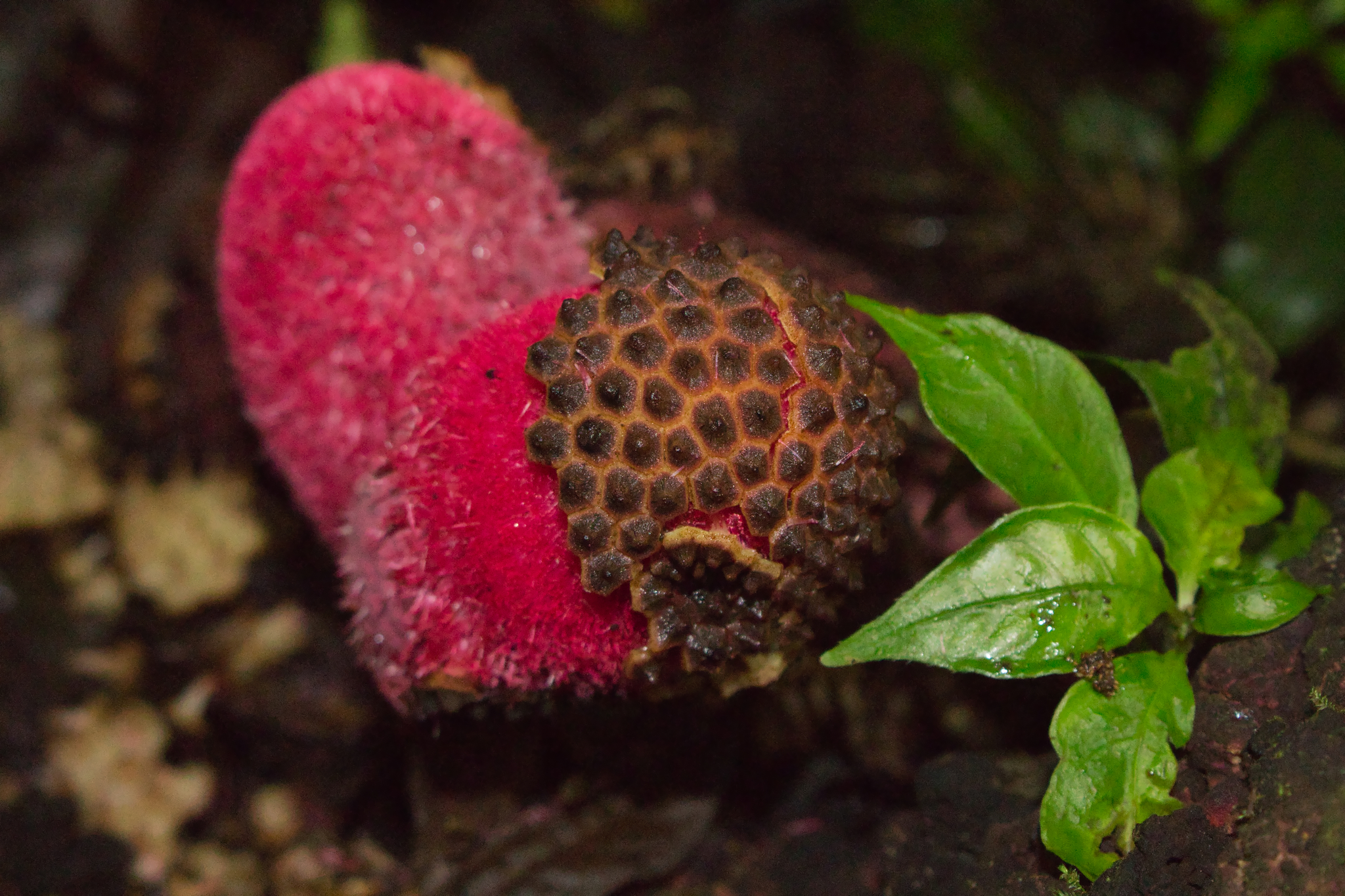

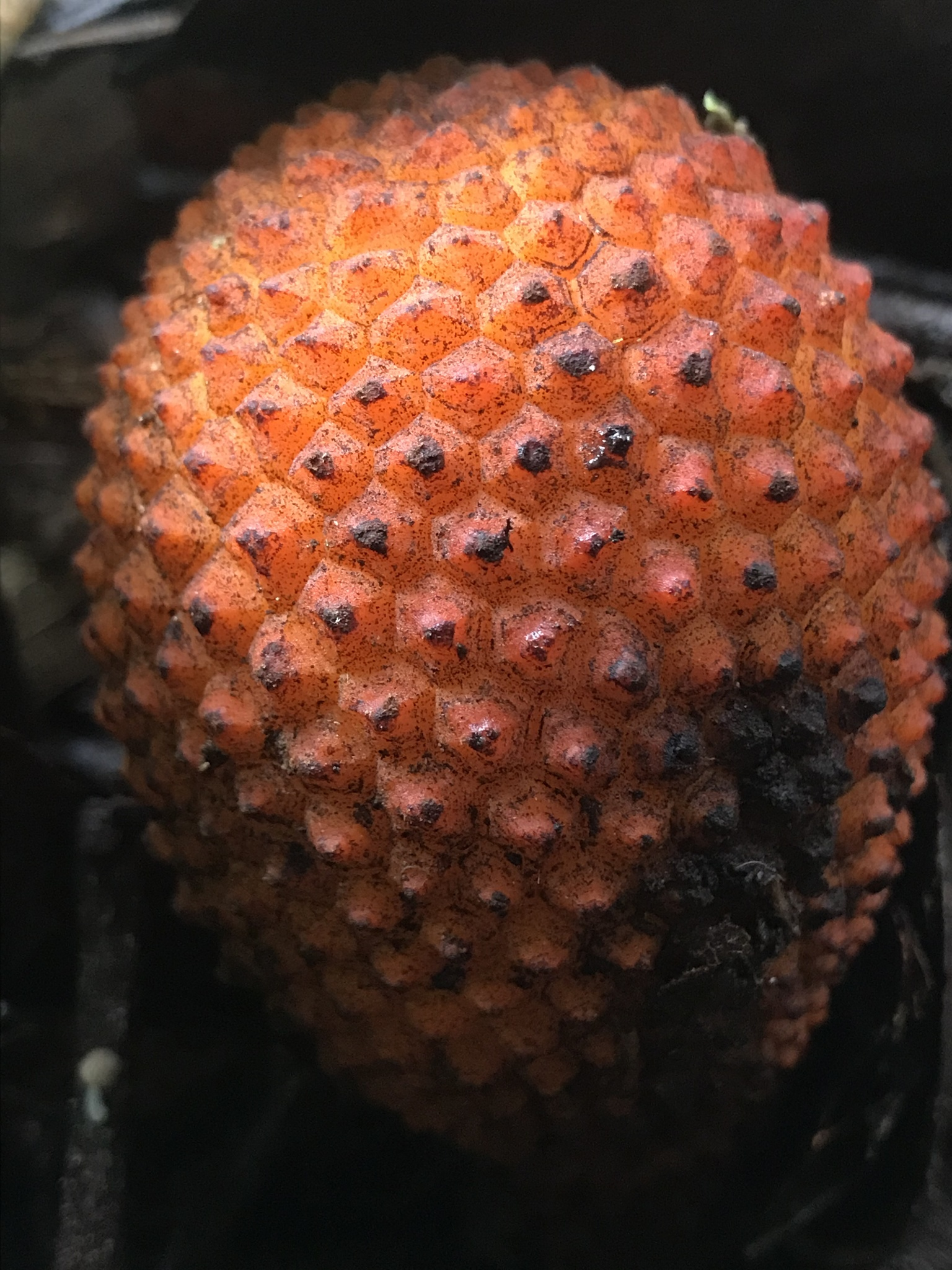

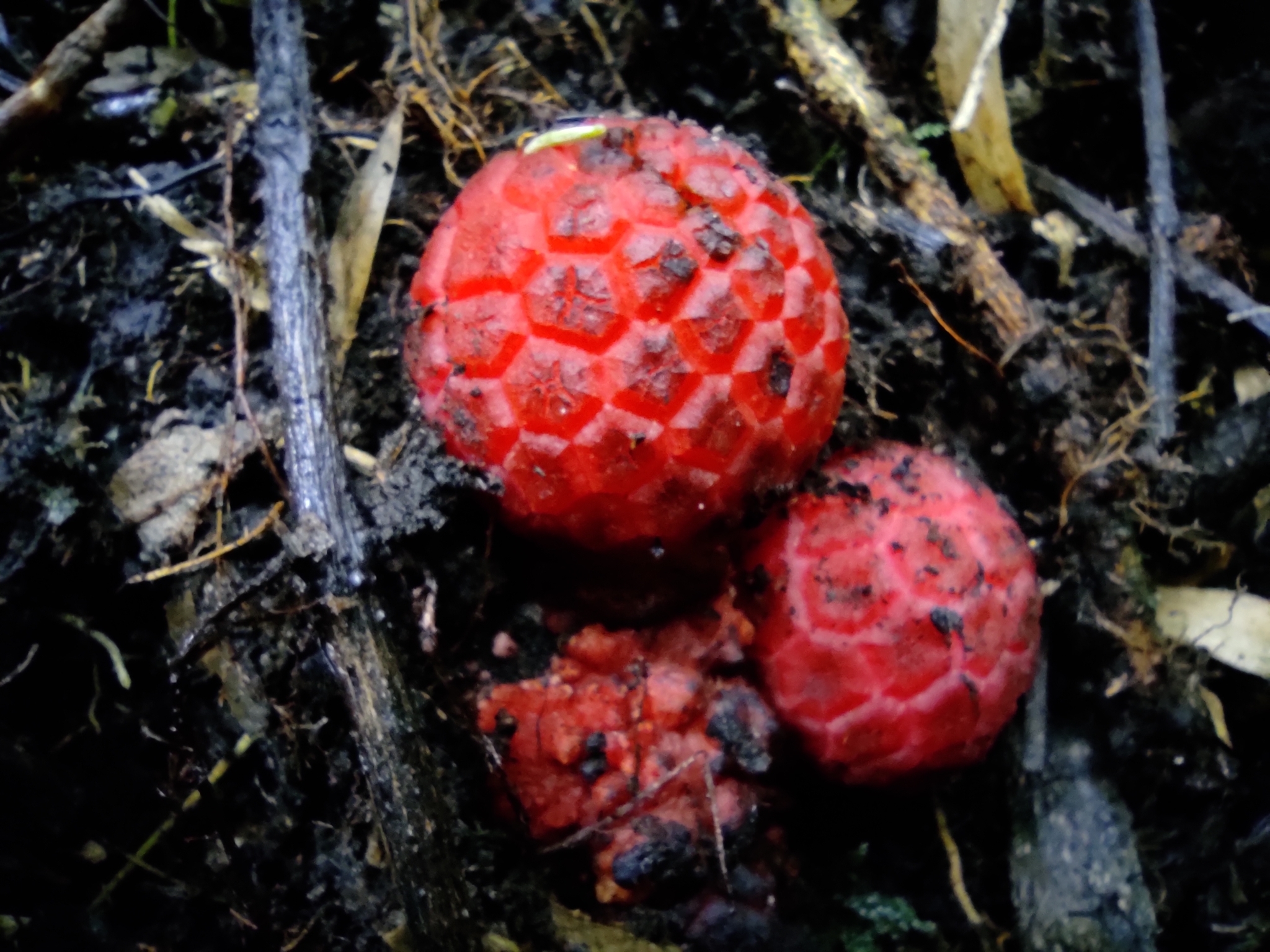

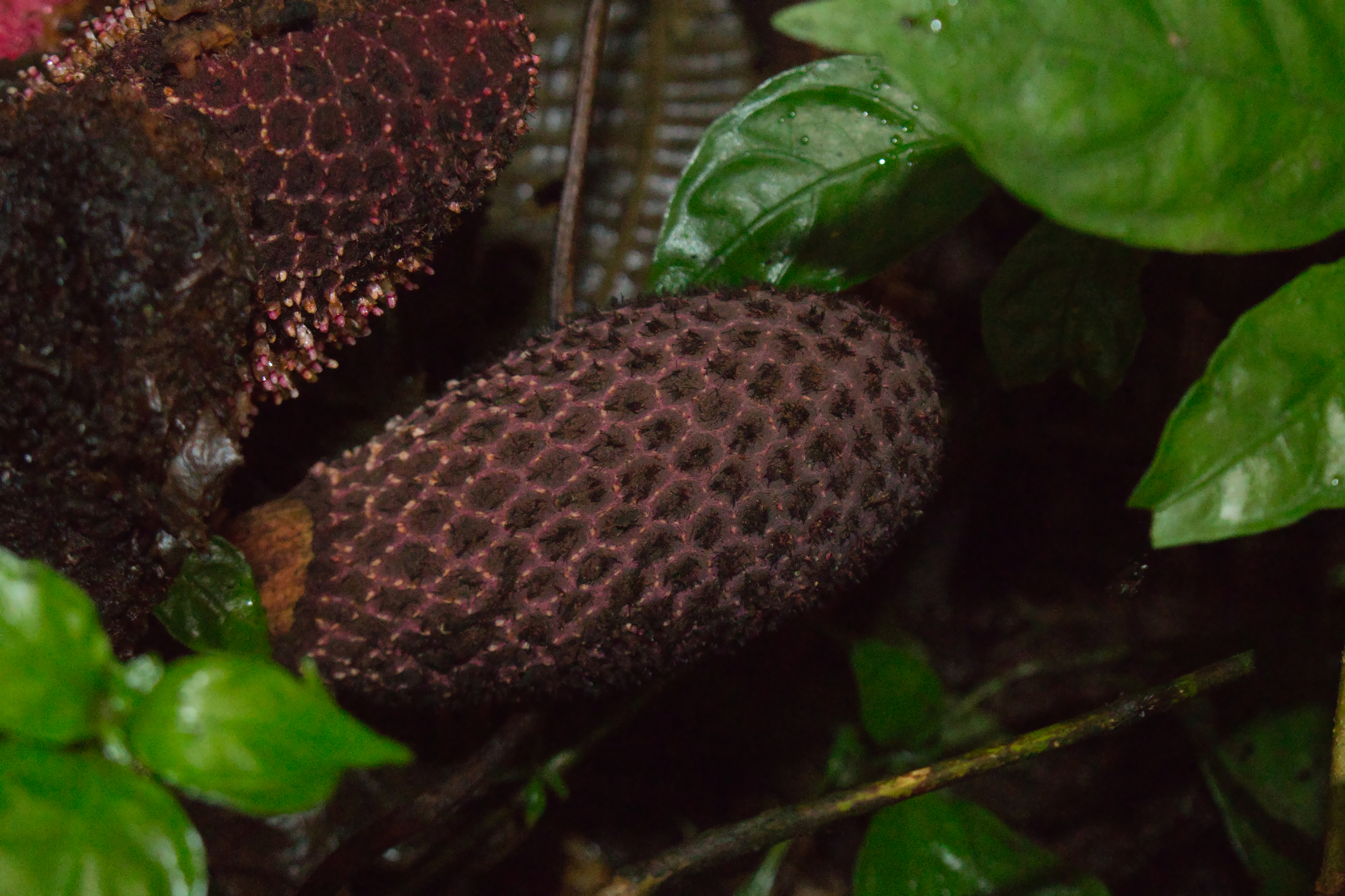
