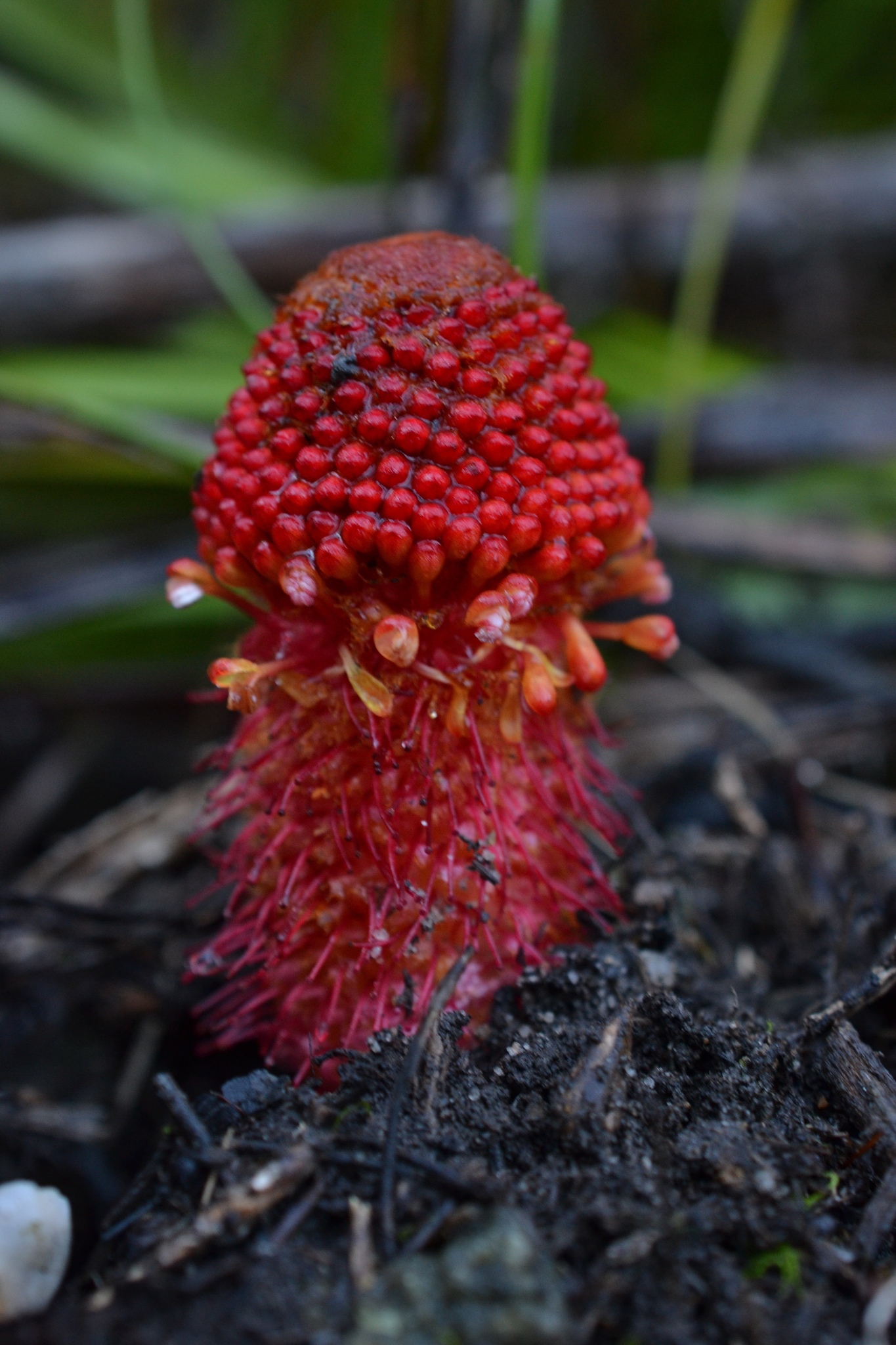

Scientific classification
- Kingdom: Plantae
- Clade: Tracheophytes
- Clade: Angiosperms
- Clade: Eudicots
- Order: Santalales
- Family: Balanophoraceae
- Genus: Mystropetalon; Harv.

Synonyms
- Blepharochlamys C.Presl

= Mystropetalon =

Genus of plants

Mystropetalon is a genus of flowering plants belonging to the family Balanophoraceae. Its native range is South Africa.

== Species ==
Species:

- Mystropetalon thomii Harv.
