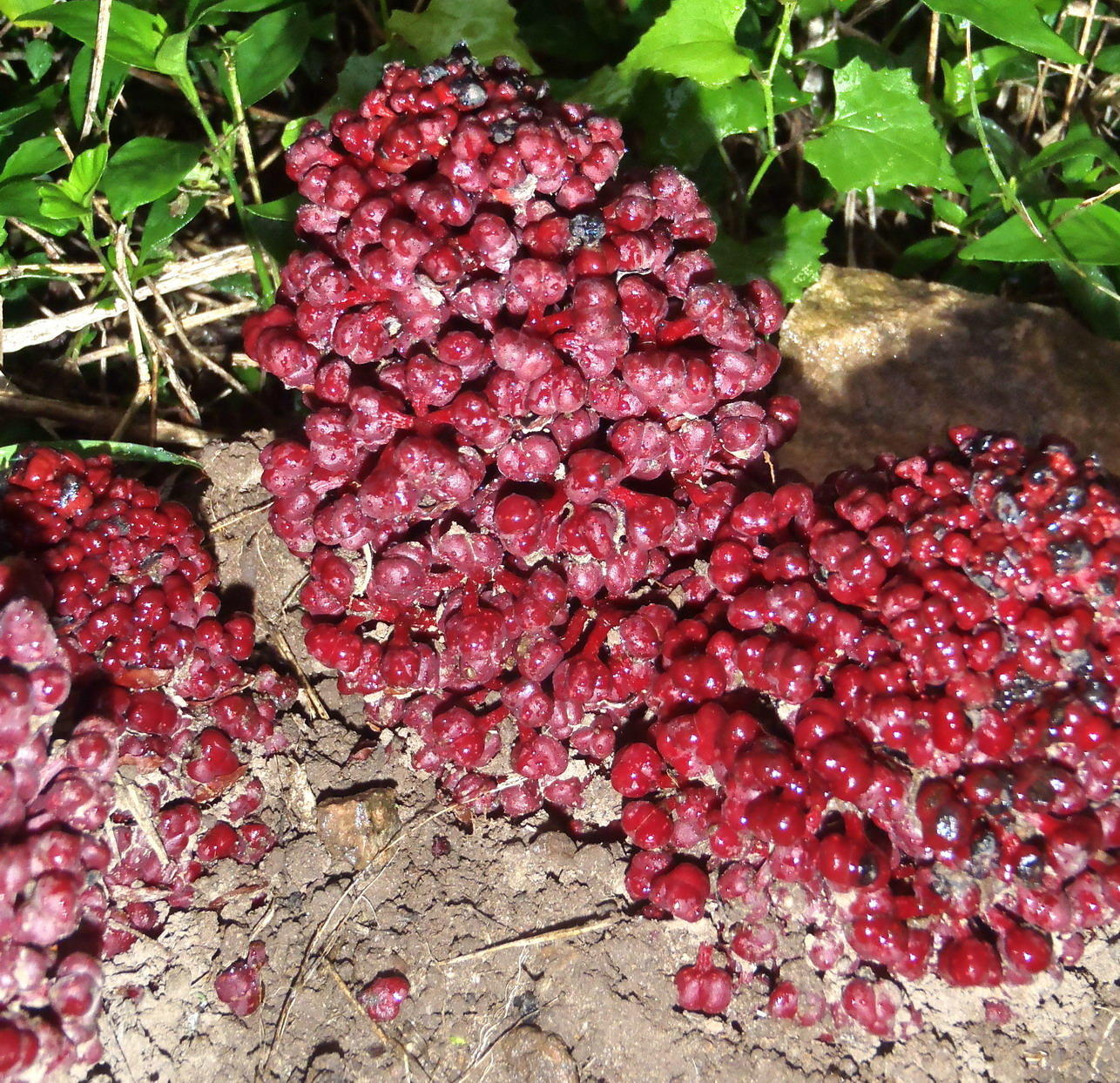
- Sarcophyte sanguinea

Scientific classification
- Kingdom: Plantae
- Clade: Tracheophytes
- Clade: Angiosperms
- Clade: Eudicots
- Order: Santalales
- Family: Balanophoraceae
- Genus: Sarcophyte; Sparrm.

= Sarcophyte =

Genus of plants

Sarcophyte is a genus of flowering plants belonging to the family Balanophoraceae.

Its native range is Ethiopia to Southern Africa.

== Species ==
Species:

- Sarcophyte piriei Hutch.
- Sarcophyte sanguinea Sparrm.
