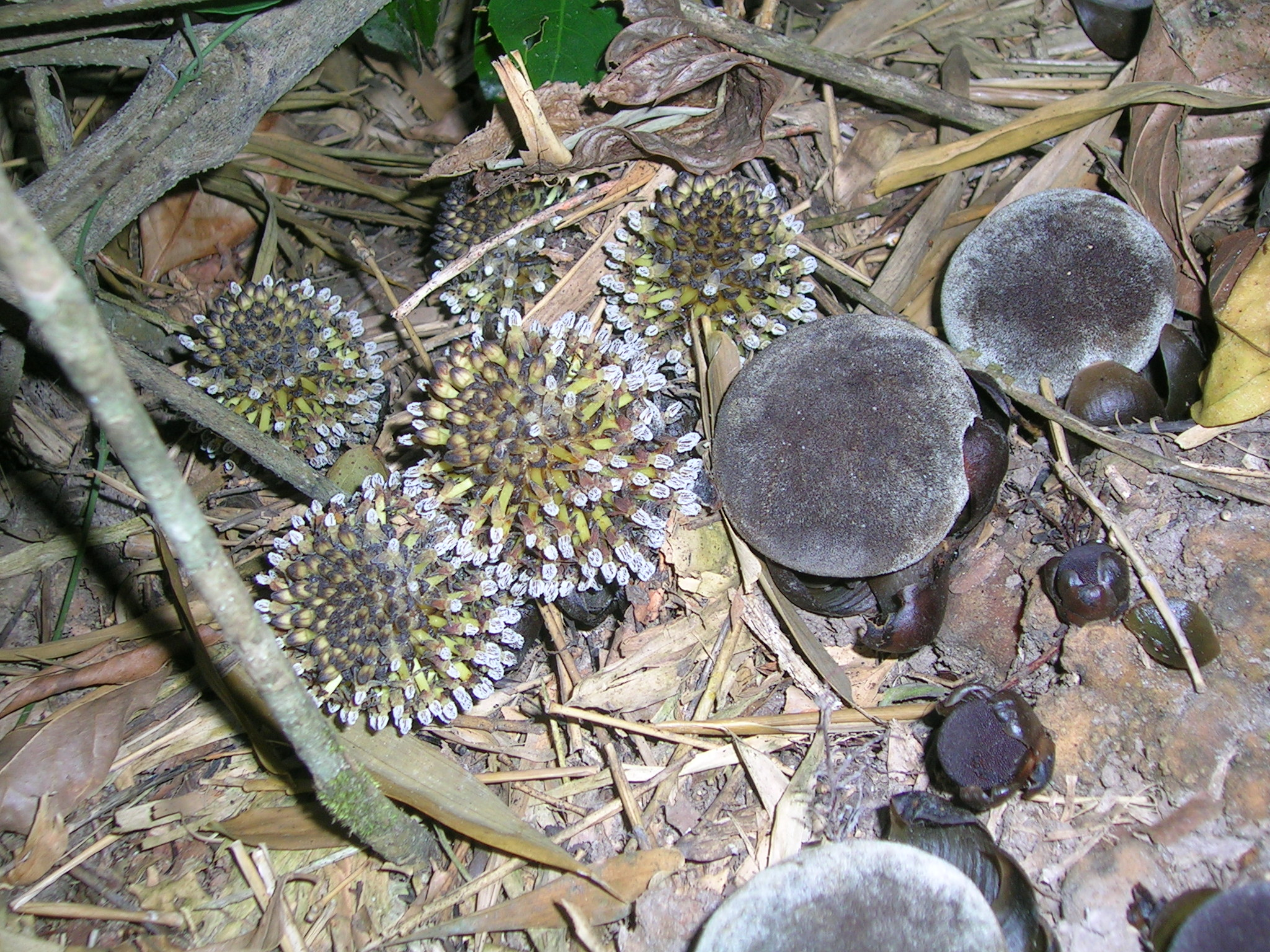
- A Balanophora sp. from the Western Ghats

Scientific classification
- Kingdom: Plantae
- Clade: Tracheophytes
- Clade: Angiosperms
- Clade: Eudicots
- Order: Santalales
- Family: Balanophoraceae; Rich.

Genera
- See text.

= Balanophoraceae =

Family of flowering plants

The Balanophoraceae are a subtropical to tropical family of obligate parasitic flowering plants, notable for their unusual development and formerly obscure affinities. In the broadest circumscription, the family consists of 16 genera. Alternatively, three genera may be split off into the segregate family Mystropetalaceae.

The plants are normally found growing on tree roots in moist inland forests and have an above ground inflorescence with the overall appearance of a fungus, composed of numerous minute flowers. The inflorescences develop inside the tuberous underground part of the plant, before rupturing it and surfacing. The plants are monoecious or dioecious, and the fruits are indehiscent drupes or nuts. The underground portion, which attaches itself to the host, looks like a tuber, and is not a proper root system. The plants contain no chlorophyll. Balanophora means "bearing an acorn" (from the shape of the female inflorescence).

== Taxonomy ==
In the classification system of Dahlgren, the Balanophoraceae were placed in the order Balanophorales in the superorder Balanophoriflorae (also called Balanophoranae). The APG IV system of 2016 (unchanged from the APG III system of 2009), also recognizes this family, including it in the order Santalales, where it was also placed by the Cronquist system (1981).

A 2015 molecular phylogenetic suggested that as circumscribed in the APG IV system, Balanophoraceae is not monophyletic. The authors of the study proposed dividing Balanophoraceae s.l. into Balanophoraceae s.s. and the family Mystropetalaceae, containing three monotypic genera, Dactylanthus, Hachettea and Mystropetalon. The cladogram below shows the relationships obtained (using the broad APG IV circumscriptions of Olacaceae and Santalaceae).

- Santalales
  - Olacaceae s.l.
  - - Balanophoraceae s.s.
    - - - - Mystropetalaceae
          - Loranthaceae
        - - Misodendraceae
          - Schoepfiaceae
      - - Opiliaceae
        - Santalaceae s.l.

=== Genera ===
As of July 2021, the broadly circumscribed family was accepted by Plants of the World Online, which included the following genera. Other sources place three of the genera in the segregate family Mystropetalaceae.

- Balanophora J.R.Forst. & G.Forst.
- Chlamydophytum Mildbr.
- Corynaea Hook.f.
- Dactylanthus Hook.f. [Mystropetalaceae]
- Ditepalanthus Fagerl.
- Hachettea Baill. [Mystropetalaceae]
- Helosis Rich.
- Langsdorffia Mart.
- Lathrophytum Eichler
- Lophophytum Schott & Endl.
- Mystropetalon Harv. [Mystropetalaceae]
- Ombrophytum Poepp. ex Endl.
- Rhopalocnemis Jungh.
- Sarcophyte Sparrm.
- Scybalium Schott & Endl.
- Thonningia Vahl
