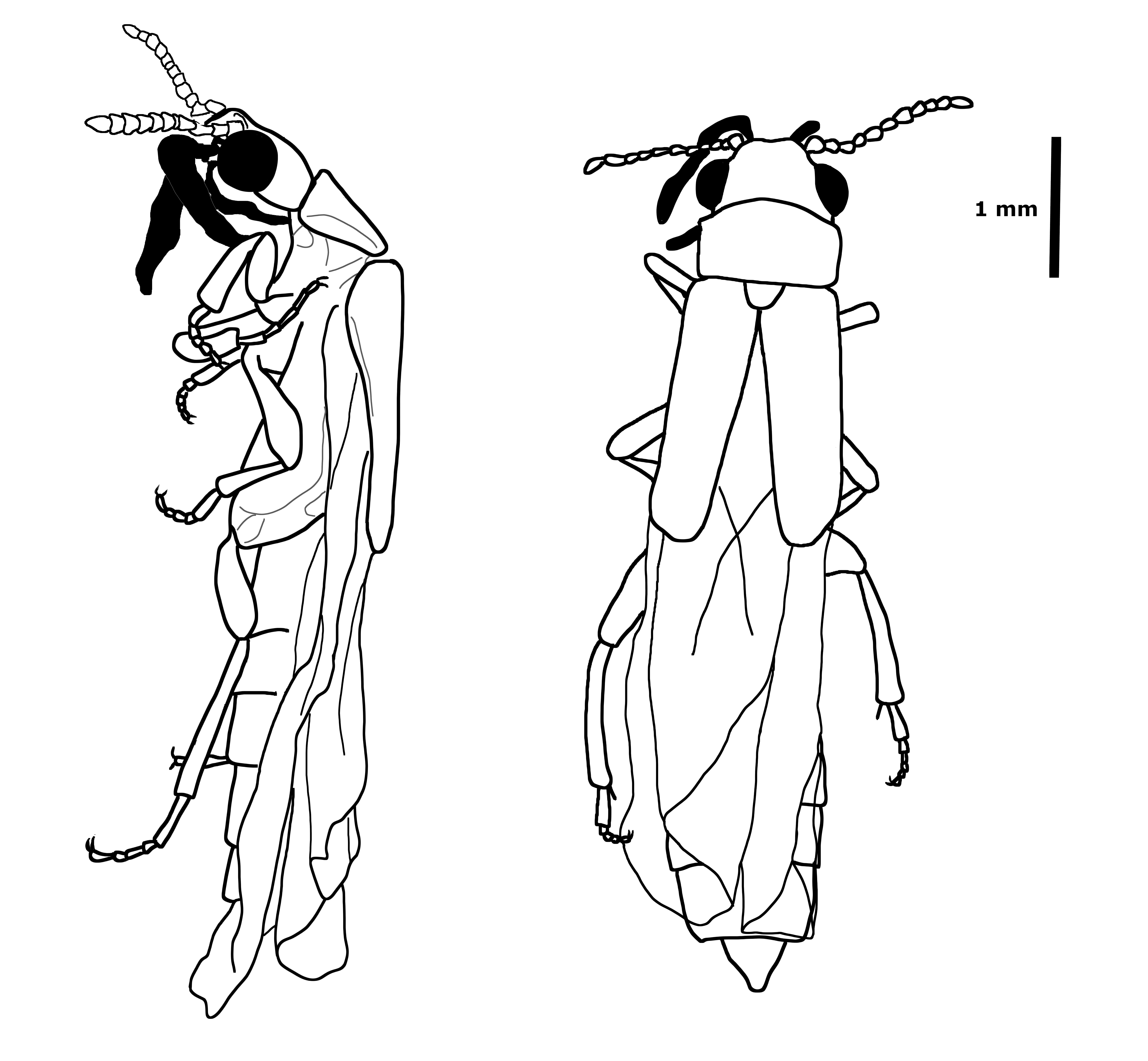
- Telegeusis sp.

Scientific classification
- Kingdom: Animalia
- Phylum: Arthropoda
- Clade: Pancrustacea
- Class: Insecta
- Order: Coleoptera
- Suborder: Polyphaga
- Infraorder: Elateriformia
- Family: Omethidae
- Subfamily: Telegeusinae

= Telegeusinae =

Subfamily of beetles

Telegeusinae (common name long-lipped beetles) is a small subfamily of beetles in the family Omethidae recognizable by enlarged palpi found in males. Though relatively rare, males are sometimes found in large numbers in black light traps. Females are not known in this group, but it is theorized that females are larviform as found in many closely related taxa.

== Description ==
The most recognizable features of Telegeusinae are the extremely long labial and maxillary palpi with enlarged terminal segments. All species are small, 3.5 to 8 mm in length. The body of these beetles is flattened dorsally, the elytra are short, the antennae are filiform with 11 segments, and the tarsi are 5 segmented.

== Taxonomy ==
The genus Telegeusis was first described in 1895 by Horn, and later placed within Drilidae by Leng in 1910. In 1920, Telegeusis was made its own family, Telegeusidae. This placement of Telegeusis was controversial at the time with some authors suggesting placement within Lymexylidae due to morphological similarities with Atractocerus, and others placing it into Cantharidae. In 2014, molecular data supported treating the group as a subset of Omethidae, but a 2015 study based on morphological data placed Telegeusidae as the sister group of Phengodidae. The taxonomic placement of this group remains unclear.

=== Genera ===
- Platydrilus López-Pérez & Zaragoza-Caballero, 2021 (1 species) (a junior homonym of Platydrilus Michaelsen, 1891)
- Pseudokarumia Pic, 1931 (1 species)
- Pseudotelegeusis Wittmer, 1976 (4 species)
- Stenodrilus López-Pérez & Zaragoza-Caballero, 2021 (1 species)
- Telegeusis Horn, 1895 (16 species)

== Life history ==
Little is known about the life history of Telegeusinae. Males have been collected from March to July with most specimens collected in passive flight traps. These collections are concentrated to two hours before sunset, which is theorized to be the time period that females are receptive to mating. Many species have orange and black aposematic coloration, but it is unknown if they are toxic. There is one possible observation of a male associating with a milkweed plant.

== Habitat and range ==
Species are found from the Southwestern United States through Peru. They are found in a variety of ecosystems including prairies, deserts, and tropical rainforest. The highest diversity is found in Mexico.
