= Melittomma pervagum =

Scientific classification
- Kingdom: Animalia
- Phylum: Arthropoda
- Class: Insecta
- Order: Coleoptera
- Suborder: Polyphaga
- Infraorder: Cucujiformia
- Family: Lymexylidae
- Genus: Melittomma
- Species: M. pervagum

Binomial name
- Melittomma pervagum Olliff, 1889

Species of beetle

Melittomma pervagum is a species of beetle in the family Lymexylidae. It was described by Arthur Sidney Olliff in 1889. It is known from Australia, from Lord Howe Island.
