= Ginglymocladus discoidea =

Scientific classification
- Domain: Eukaryota
- Kingdom: Animalia
- Phylum: Arthropoda
- Class: Insecta
- Order: Coleoptera
- Suborder: Polyphaga
- Infraorder: Elateriformia
- Family: Omethidae
- Genus: Ginglymocladus
- Species: G. discoidea

Binomial name
- Ginglymocladus discoidea Van Dyke, 1918

Species of beetle

Ginglymocladus discoidea is a species of false soldier beetle in the family Omethidae. It is found in North America.
