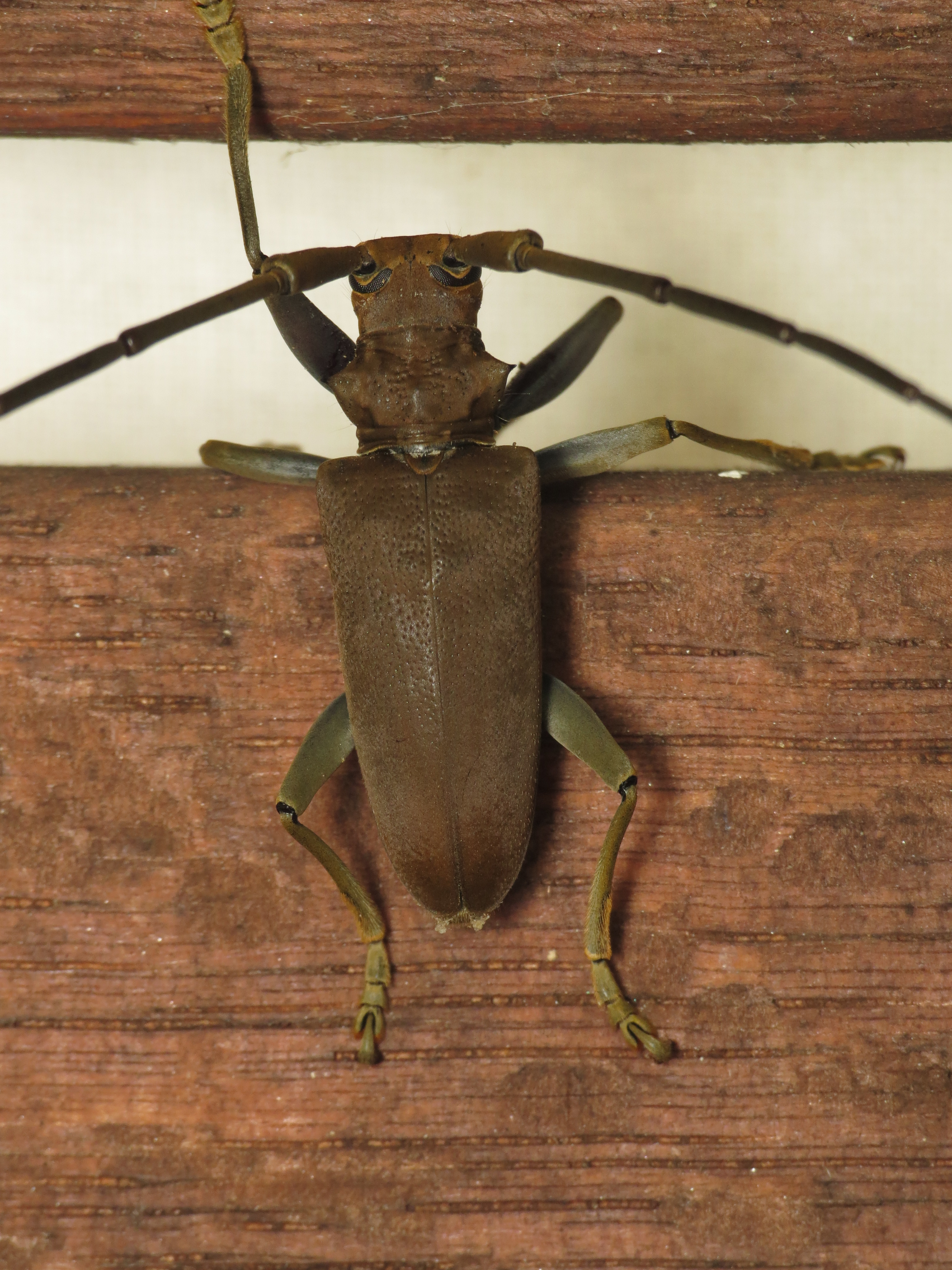

Scientific classification
- Domain: Eukaryota
- Kingdom: Animalia
- Phylum: Arthropoda
- Class: Insecta
- Order: Coleoptera
- Suborder: Polyphaga
- Infraorder: Cucujiformia
- Family: Cerambycidae
- Tribe: Lamiini
- Genus: Acalolepta
- Species: A. aesthetica

Binomial name
- Acalolepta aesthetica (Olliff, 1890)

Synonyms
- Dihammus aestheticus (Olliff, 1890); Haplohammus aestheticus (Olliff, 1890); Monochamus aestheticus Olliff, 1890

= Acalolepta aesthetica =

Species of beetle

Acalolepta aesthetica is a species of beetle in the family Cerambycidae. It was described by Arthur Sidney Olliff in 1890. It is known from Australia. It has recently been documented as an invasive pest in Hawaii, attacking candlenut, various citrus trees, cycads, and cacao, despite the fact that it is not known to attack the same or similar species in its native Queensland, Australia.
