= Telegeusis nubifer =

Scientific classification
- Domain: Eukaryota
- Kingdom: Animalia
- Phylum: Arthropoda
- Class: Insecta
- Order: Coleoptera
- Suborder: Polyphaga
- Infraorder: Elateriformia
- Family: Omethidae
- Genus: Telegeusis
- Species: T. nubifer

Binomial name
- Telegeusis nubifer Martin, 1932

Synonyms
- Telegeusis nunifer Zaragoza-Caballero & Rodriguez-Velez, 2011 (misspelling)

Species of beetle

Telegeusis nubifer is a species of long-lipped beetle in the family Omethidae. It is found in North America.
