= Troglomethes leechi =

Scientific classification
- Domain: Eukaryota
- Kingdom: Animalia
- Phylum: Arthropoda
- Class: Insecta
- Order: Coleoptera
- Suborder: Polyphaga
- Infraorder: Elateriformia
- Family: Omethidae
- Genus: Troglomethes
- Species: T. leechi

Binomial name
- Troglomethes leechi Wittmer, 1970

Species of beetle

Troglomethes leechi is a species of false soldier beetle in the family Omethidae. It is found in North America.
