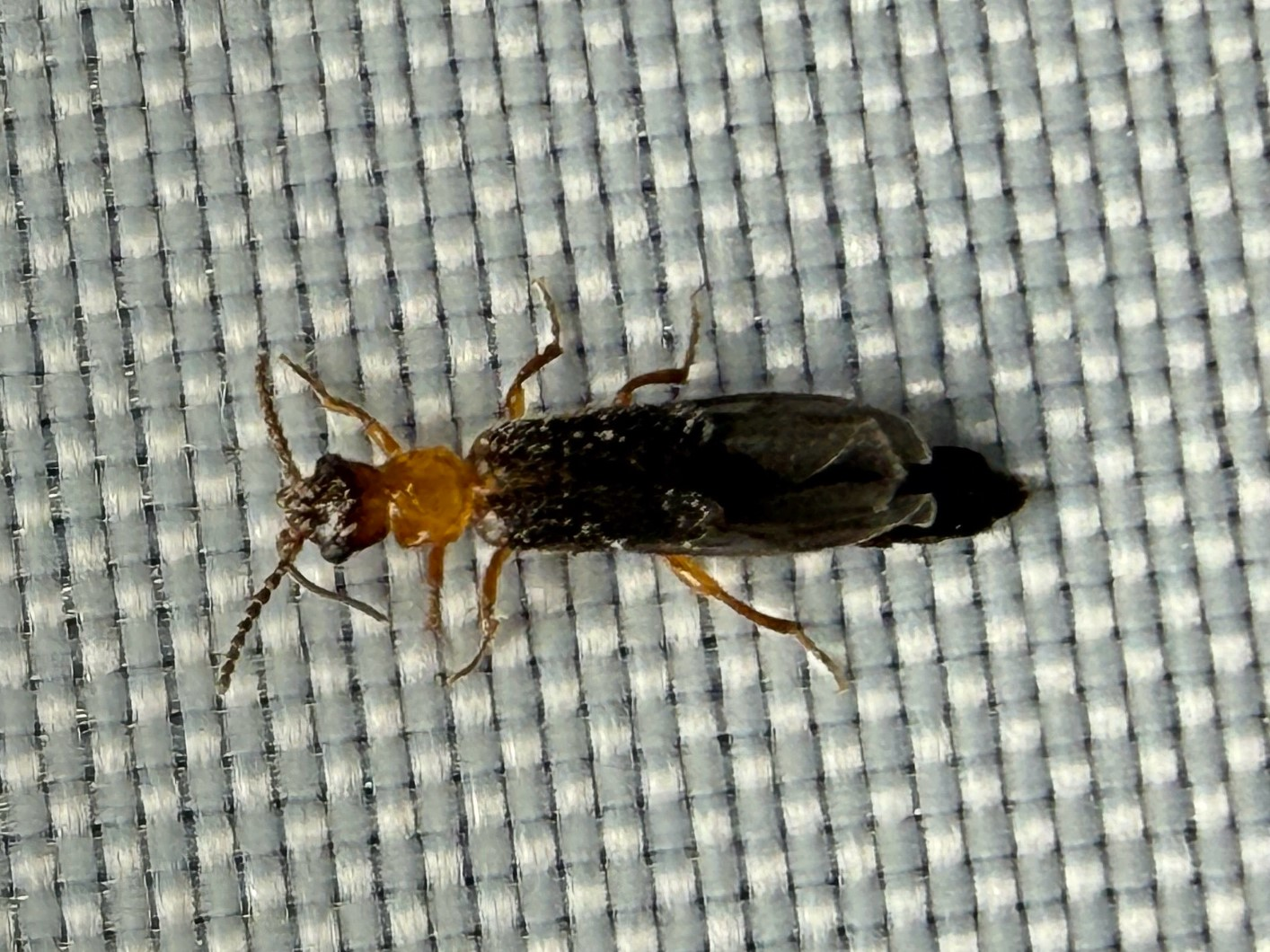

Scientific classification
- Kingdom: Animalia
- Phylum: Arthropoda
- Clade: Pancrustacea
- Class: Insecta
- Order: Coleoptera
- Suborder: Polyphaga
- Infraorder: Elateriformia
- Family: Omethidae
- Genus: Telegeusis
- Species: T. texensis

Binomial name
- Telegeusis texensis Fleenor & Taber, 2001

= Telegeusis texensis =

Species of beetle

Telegeusis texensis, commonly known as the Texas long-lipped beetle, is a species of long-lipped beetle in the family Omethidae. It is found in North America.
