= Matheteus =

Scientific classification
- Kingdom: Animalia
- Phylum: Arthropoda
- Class: Insecta
- Order: Coleoptera
- Suborder: Polyphaga
- Infraorder: Elateriformia
- Family: Omethidae
- Subfamily: Matheteinae
- Genus: Matheteus; LeConte, 1874
- Species: M. theveneti

Binomial name
- Matheteus theveneti LeConte, 1874

Genus of beetles

Matheteus is a genus of beetles in the family Omethidae containing a single described species, M. theveneti.
