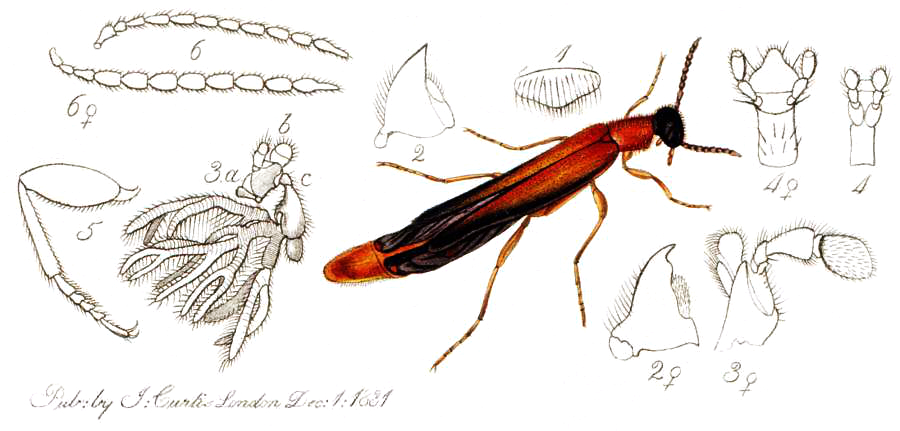
- Lymexylon navale

Scientific classification
- Kingdom: Animalia
- Phylum: Arthropoda
- Class: Insecta
- Order: Coleoptera
- Suborder: Polyphaga
- Infraorder: Cucujiformia
- Family: Lymexylidae
- Genus: Lymexylon; Fabricius, 1775

= Lymexylon =

Genus of beetles

Lymexylon is a genus of beetles in the family Lymexylidae, containing the following species:

- Lymexylon amamianum Kurosawa, 1985
- Lymexylon miyakei Nakane, 1985
- Lymexylon navale (Linnaeus, 1758)
- Lymexylon persicum Fursov, 1935
- Lymexylon ruficolle Kurosawa, 1949
