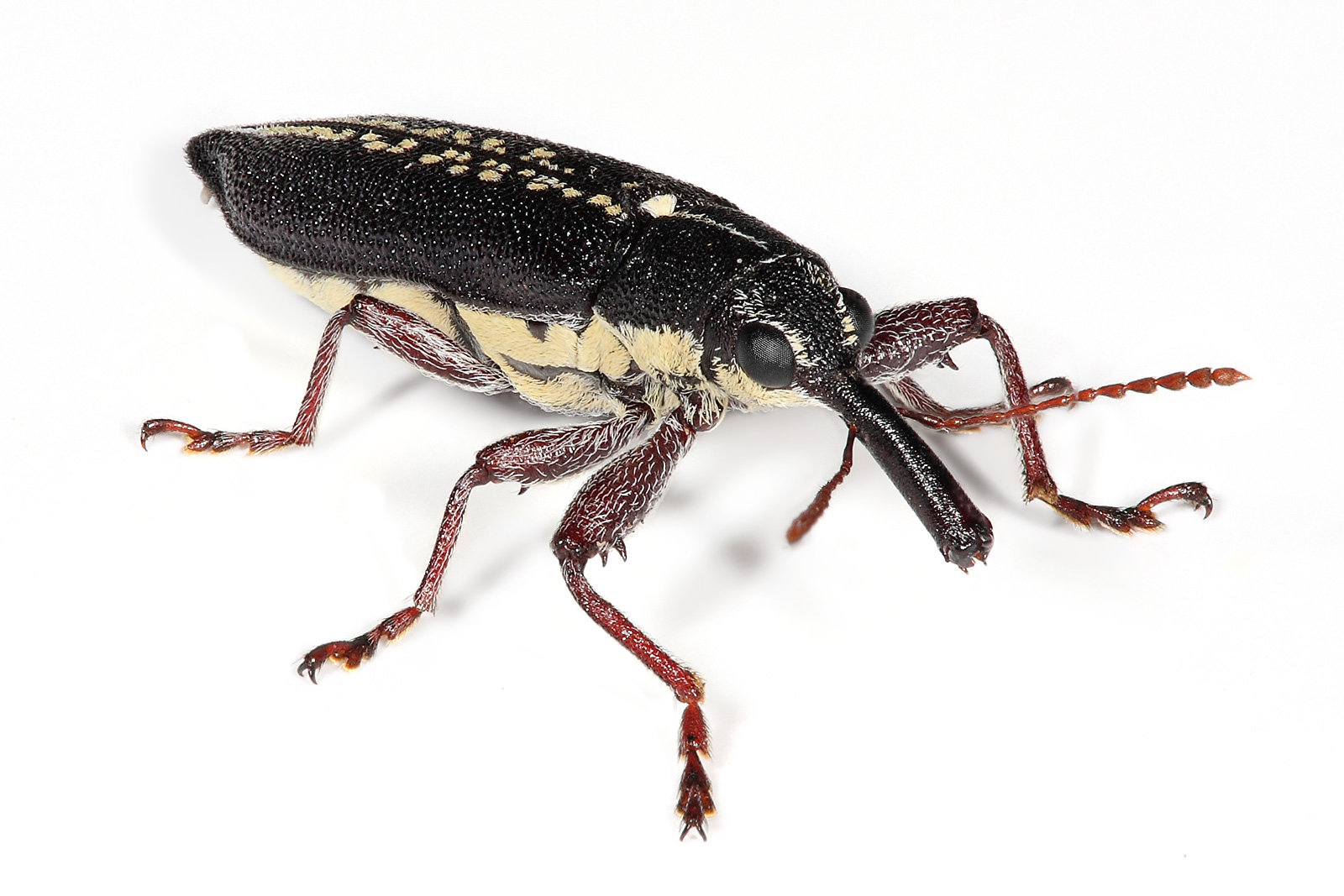

Scientific classification
- Domain: Eukaryota
- Kingdom: Animalia
- Phylum: Arthropoda
- Class: Insecta
- Order: Coleoptera
- Suborder: Polyphaga
- Infraorder: Cucujiformia
- Family: Belidae
- Subfamily: Belinae
- Genus: Rhinotia
- Species: R. hemisticta

Binomial name
- Rhinotia hemisticta (Germar, 1848)

= Rhinotia hemisticta =

Long-nosed weevil

Species of beetle

Rhinotia hemisticta is a species of weevil in the family Belidae, commonly referred to as the long-nosed weevil, or long nosed weevil. It is found in Australia, is about 1 inch (2.5 cm) long, and is found in wooded areas.

It was first described by Ernst Friedrich Germar in 1848 as Belus hemistictus.

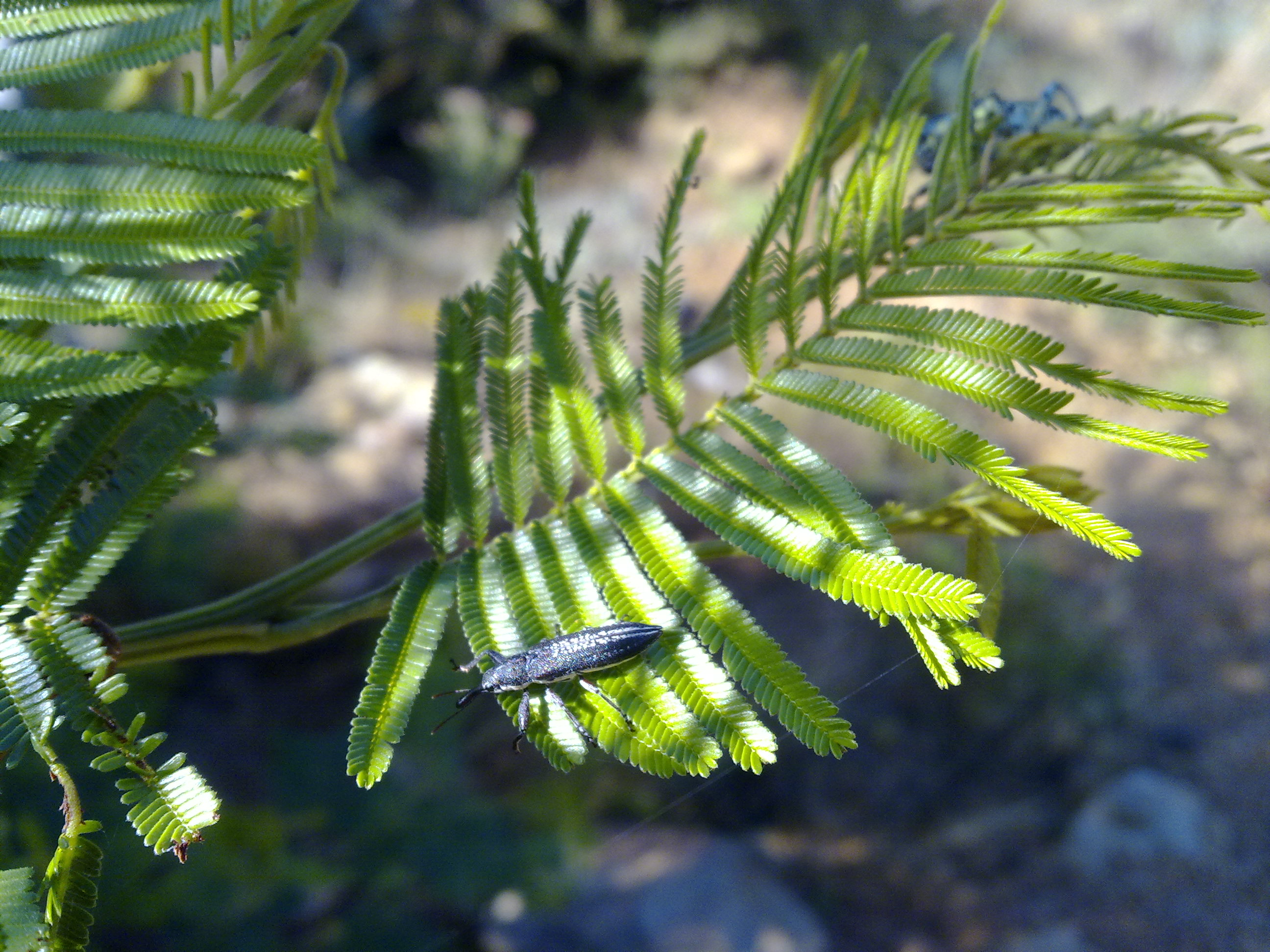
A long-nosed weevil feeding on acacia leaves in south east New South Wales

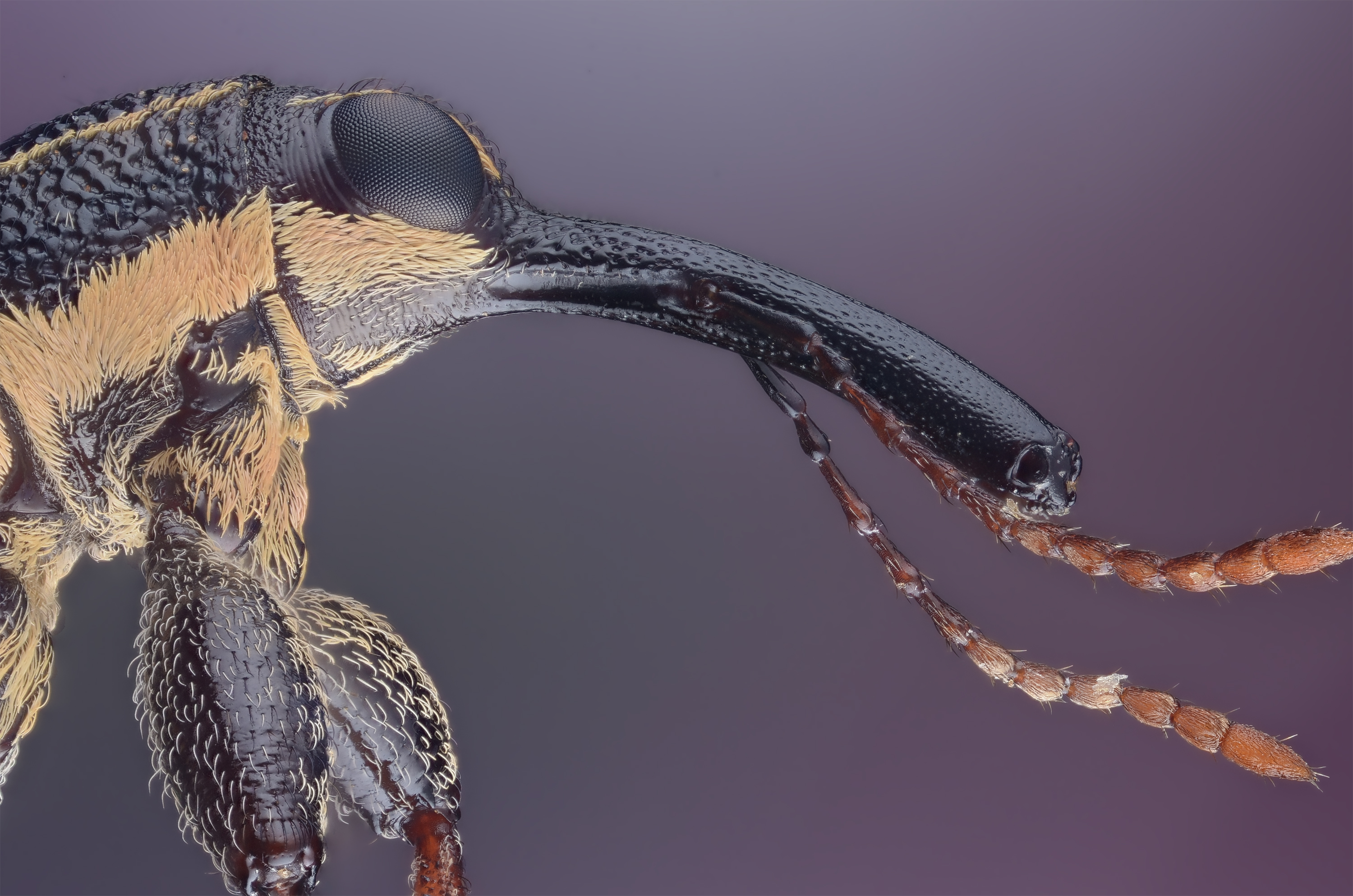
High magnification image of a long nosed weevil showing head detail

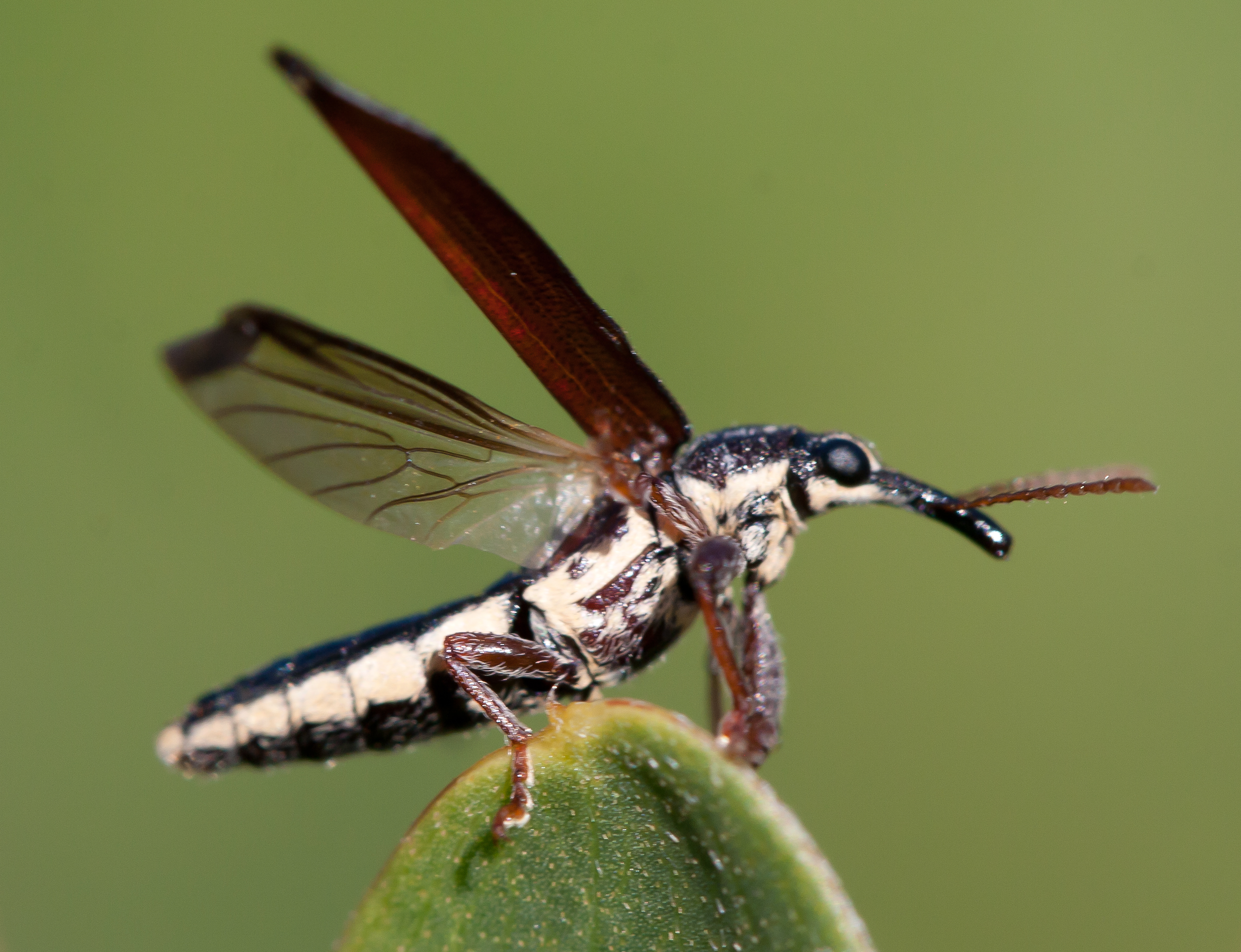
Taking flight
