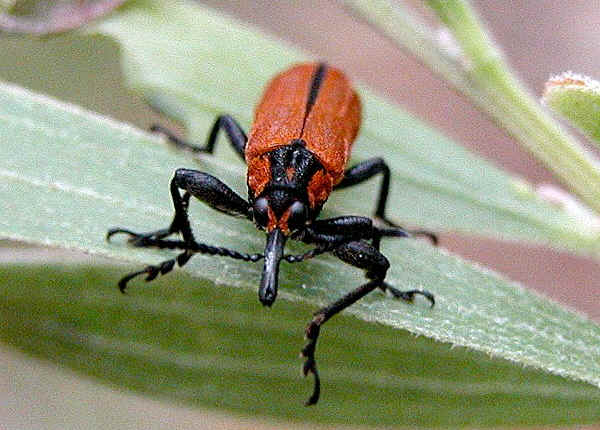

Scientific classification
- Domain: Eukaryota
- Kingdom: Animalia
- Phylum: Arthropoda
- Class: Insecta
- Order: Coleoptera
- Suborder: Polyphaga
- Infraorder: Cucujiformia
- Family: Belidae
- Genus: Rhinotia
- Species: R. haemoptera

Binomial name
- Rhinotia haemoptera Kirby, 1819

= Rhinotia haemoptera =

Species of beetle

Rhinotia haemoptera, the red weevil, is a weevil species in the family Belidae found in Australia. They resemble net-winged beetles (Lycidae) in colour and are thought to mimic them.
