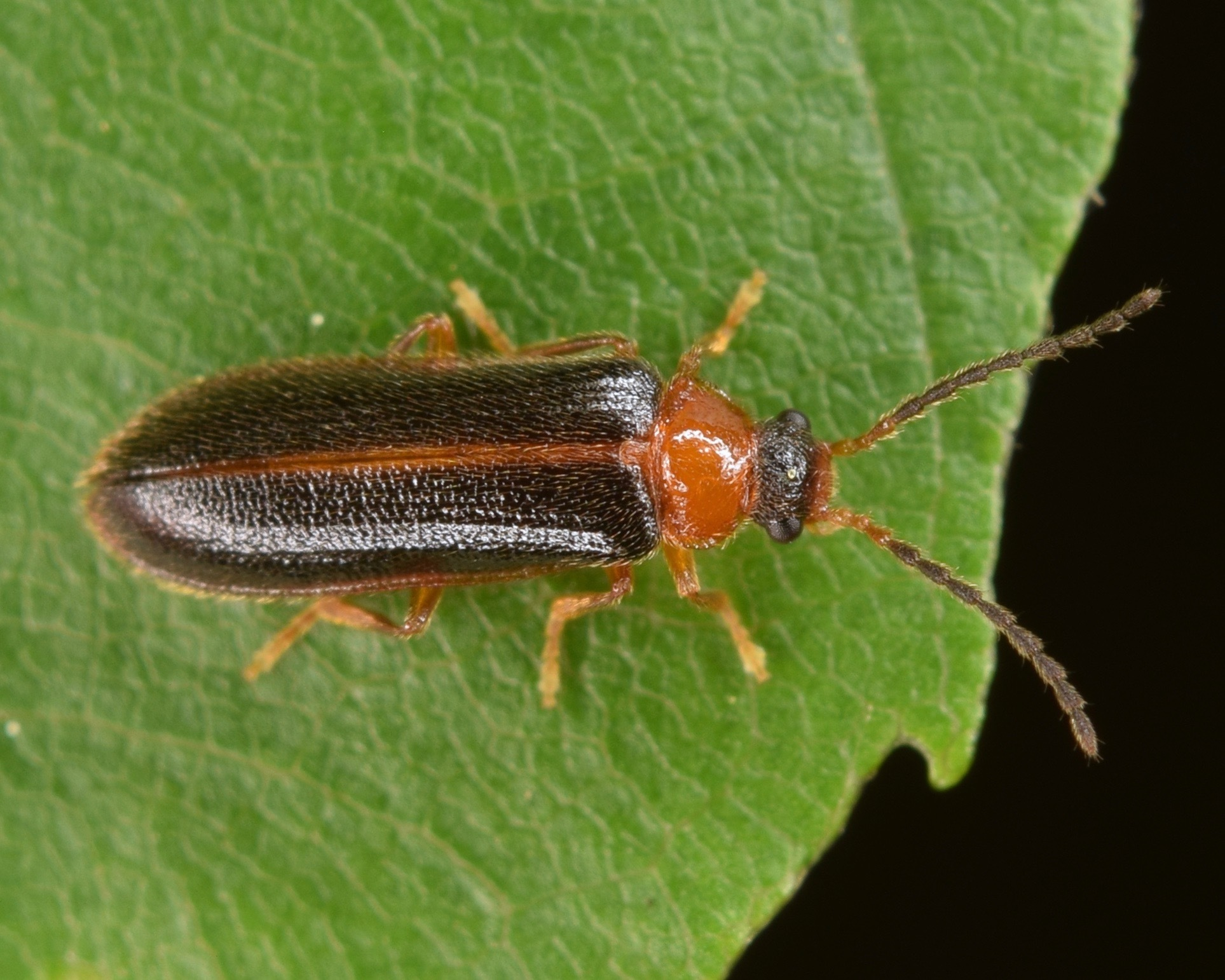
- Omethes marginatus

Scientific classification
- Kingdom: Animalia
- Phylum: Arthropoda
- Class: Insecta
- Order: Coleoptera
- Suborder: Polyphaga
- Infraorder: Elateriformia
- Family: Omethidae
- Subfamily: Omethinae
- Genus: Omethes; LeConte, 1861

Synonyms
- Elianus Lewis, 1895

= Omethes =

Genus of beetles

Omethes is a genus of false soldier beetles in the family Omethidae. There are at least two described species in Omethes.

== Species ==
- Omethes rugiceps (Lewis, 1895)
- Omethes marginatus LeConte, 1861
