= Melittommopsis =

Scientific classification
- Kingdom: Animalia
- Phylum: Arthropoda
- Class: Insecta
- Order: Coleoptera
- Suborder: Polyphaga
- Infraorder: Cucujiformia
- Family: Lymexylidae
- Genus: Melittommopsis; Lane, 1955

Genus of beetles

Melittommopsis is a genus of beetles in the family Lymexylidae, containing the following species:

- Melittommopsis abdominalis (Pic, 1936)
- Melittommopsis juquiensis Lane, 1955
- Melittommopsis nigra Lane, 1955
- Melittommopsis ruficollis (Pic, 1936)
- Melittommopsis valida (Schenkling, 1914)
