= Rhinotia acrobeles =

Scientific classification
- Domain: Eukaryota
- Kingdom: Animalia
- Phylum: Arthropoda
- Class: Insecta
- Order: Coleoptera
- Suborder: Polyphaga
- Infraorder: Cucujiformia
- Family: Belidae
- Subfamily: Belinae
- Genus: Rhinotia
- Species: R. acrobeles

Binomial name
- Rhinotia acrobeles (Olliff, 1889)

Synonyms
- Belus acrobeles Olliff, 1889

Species of beetle

Rhinotia acrobeles is a species of weevil in the family Belidae. It was first described by Arthur Sidney Olliff in 1889 as Belus acrobeles, from specimens found on Lord Howe Island.
