= Malthomethes =

Scientific classification
- Kingdom: Animalia
- Phylum: Arthropoda
- Class: Insecta
- Order: Coleoptera
- Suborder: Polyphaga
- Infraorder: Elateriformia
- Family: Omethidae
- Subfamily: Omethinae
- Genus: Malthomethes; Fender, 1975
- Species: M. oregonus

Binomial name
- Malthomethes oregonus Fender, 1975

Genus of beetles

Malthomethes is a genus of false soldier beetles in the family Omethidae, containing a single described species, Malthomethes oregonus.
