= Urtea =

Urtea graeca

Scientific classification
- Kingdom: Animalia
- Phylum: Arthropoda
- Class: Insecta
- Order: Coleoptera
- Suborder: Polyphaga
- Infraorder: Cucujiformia
- Family: Lymexylidae
- Genus: Urtea; Paulus, 2004
- Species: U. graeca

Binomial name
- Urtea graeca Paulus, 2004

Genus of beetles

Urtea graeca is a species of beetles in the family Lymexylidae, the only species in the genus Urtea.
