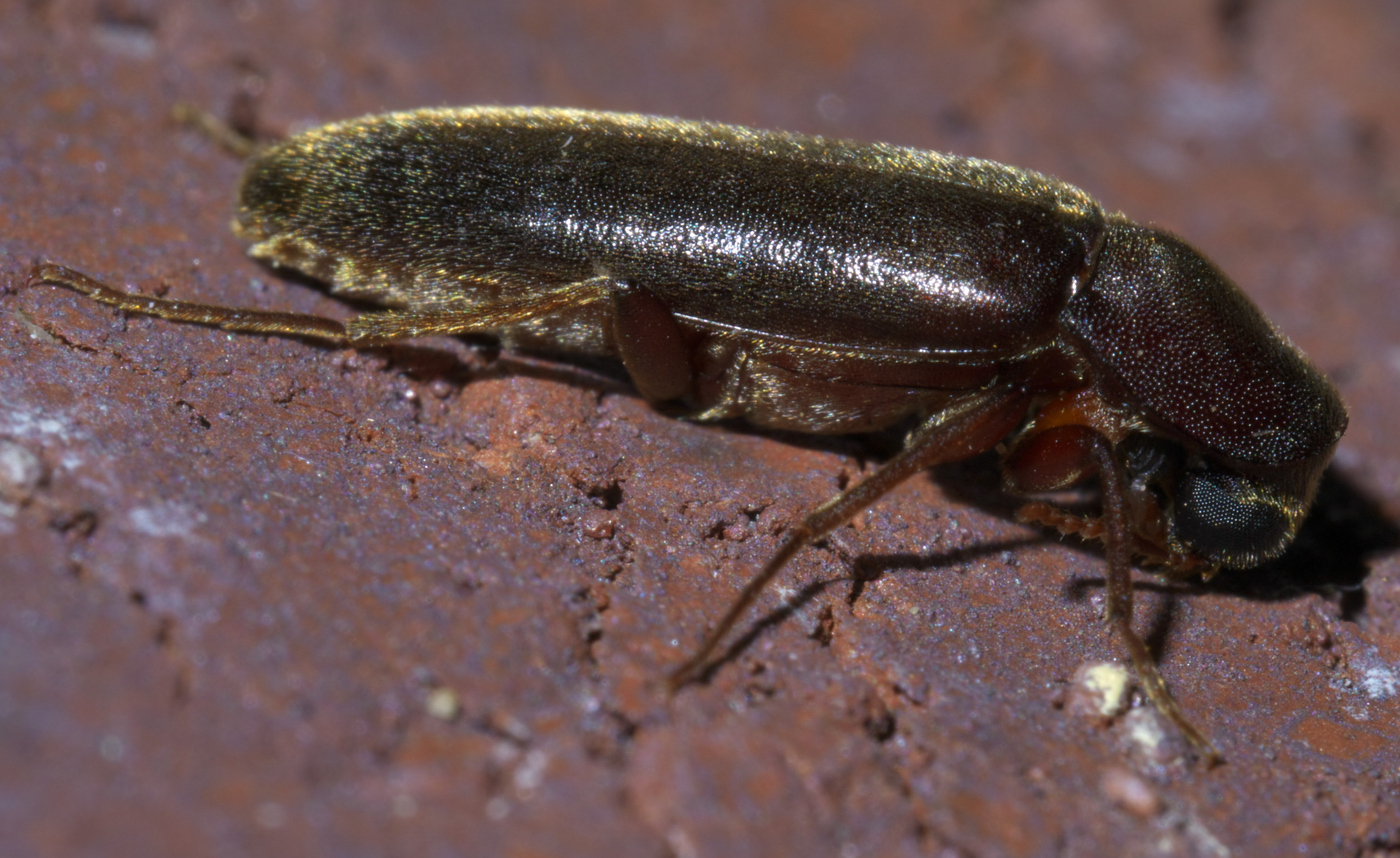
- Melittomma sericeum

Scientific classification
- Kingdom: Animalia
- Phylum: Arthropoda
- Class: Insecta
- Order: Coleoptera
- Suborder: Polyphaga
- Infraorder: Cucujiformia
- Family: Lymexylidae
- Subfamily: Melittommatinae
- Genus: Melittomma; Murray, 1867

= Melittomma =

Genus of beetles

Melittomma is a genus of beetles in the family Lymexylidae, containing the following species:

- Melittomma africanum (Thomson, 1858)
- Melittomma albitarse Blair, 1936
- Melittomma auberti Fairmaire, 1891
- Melittomma benitonum Fairmaire, 1901
- Melittomma brasiliense (Laporte, 1832)
- Melittomma brunneum Fonseca & Vieira, 2001
- Melittomma coomani Pic, 1945
- Melittomma javanicum (Chevrolat, 1829)
- Melittomma lateritium Fairmaire, 1887
- Melittomma marginellum Schenkling, 1914
- Melittomma nanum Fonseca & Vieira, 2001
- Melittomma oculare (Nakane, 1963)
- Melittomma panamense Fonseca & Vieira, 2001
- Melittomma perrieri Fairmaire, 1901
- Melittomma pervagum (Olliff, 1889)
- Melittomma pilzi Orozco & Díaz, 2018
- Melittomma pubicolle Pic, 1944
- Melittomma sericeum (Harris, 1841)
- Melittomma sicardi Pic, 1939b
- Melittomma vigilans (Lea, 1912)
