= Troglomethes =

Scientific classification
- Domain: Eukaryota
- Kingdom: Animalia
- Phylum: Arthropoda
- Class: Insecta
- Order: Coleoptera
- Suborder: Polyphaga
- Infraorder: Elateriformia
- Family: Omethidae
- Subfamily: Omethinae
- Genus: Troglomethes; Wittmer, 1970

Genus of beetles

Troglomethes is a genus of false soldier beetles in the family Omethidae. There are at least two described species in Troglomethes.

== Species ==
- Troglomethes leechi Wittmer, 1970
- Troglomethes oregonensis Wittmer, 1970
