= Australymexylon =

Scientific classification
- Kingdom: Animalia
- Phylum: Arthropoda
- Class: Insecta
- Order: Coleoptera
- Suborder: Polyphaga
- Infraorder: Cucujiformia
- Family: Lymexylidae
- Genus: Australymexylon; Wheeler, 1986

Genus of beetles

Australymexylon is a genus of beetles in the family Lymexylidae, containing the following species:

- Australymexylon australe Erichson, 1842
- Australymexylon fuscipenne (Lea, 1912)
