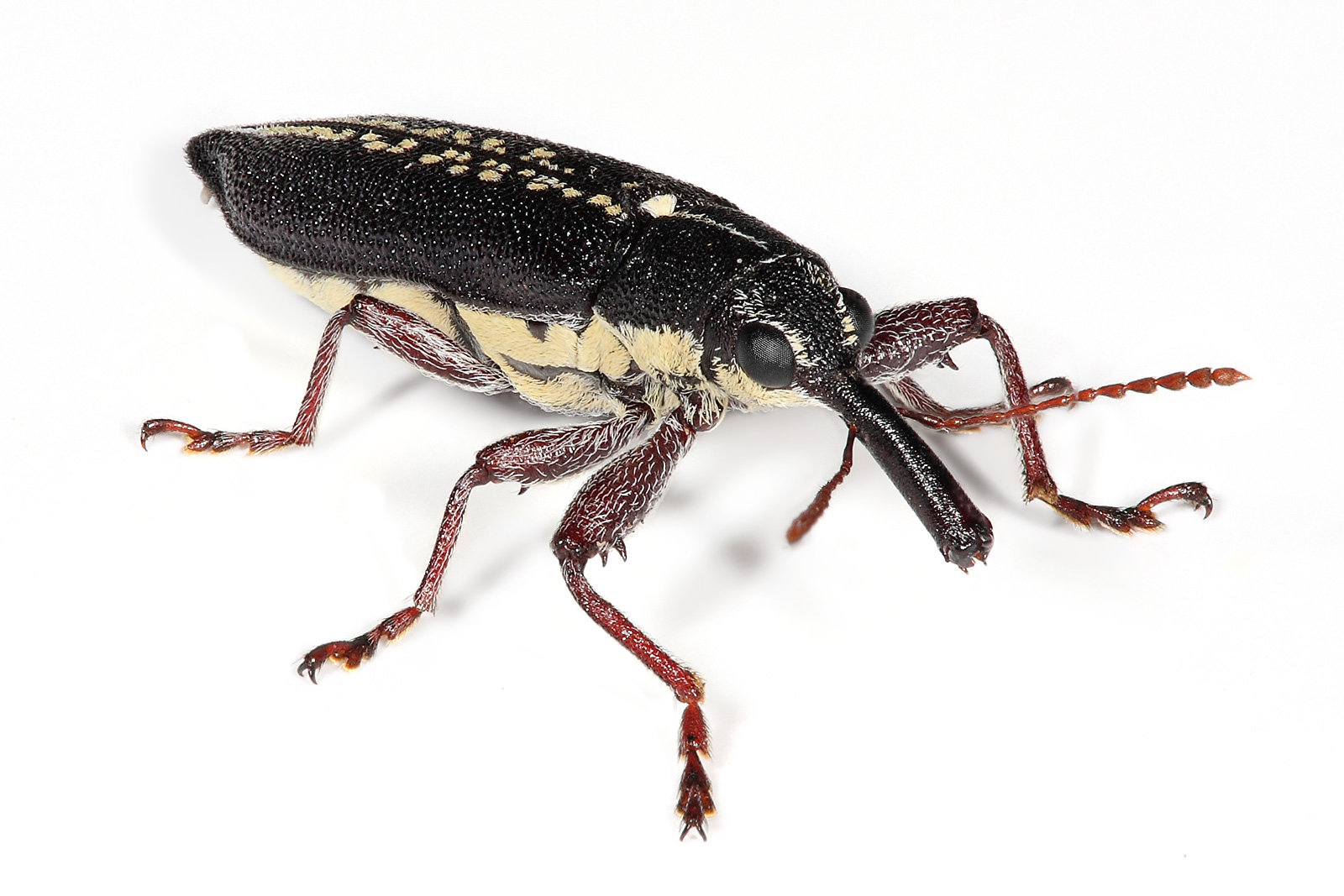
- Rhinotia hemistictus

Scientific classification
- Domain: Eukaryota
- Kingdom: Animalia
- Phylum: Arthropoda
- Class: Insecta
- Order: Coleoptera
- Suborder: Polyphaga
- Infraorder: Cucujiformia
- Family: Belidae
- Subfamily: Belinae
- Genus: Rhinotia; Kirby, 1819

species
- see text

= Rhinotia =

Genus of beetles

Rhinotia is a genus of weevils in the family Belidae. There are more than 50 described species in the genus Rhinotia, all found in Australia.

== Species ==
- Rhinotia acaciae (Lea, 1899)
- Rhinotia acanthoptera (Lea, 1910)
- Rhinotia acrobeles (Olliff, 1889)
- Rhinotia acutipennis (Lea, 1917)
- Rhinotia adelaidae (Blackburn, 1893)
- Rhinotia affinis (Perroud, 1853)
- Rhinotia amplicollis (Jekel, 1860)
- Rhinotia anguinea (Pascoe, 1872)
- Rhinotia angustata (Lea, 1917)
- Rhinotia angustula (Germar, 1848)
- Rhinotia aphthosa (Pascoe, 1872)
- Rhinotia apicalis Zimmerman, 1994
- Rhinotia bassiae (Marshall, 1936)
- Rhinotia bidentata (Donovan, 1805)
- Rhinotia bimaculata (Pascoe, 1871)
- Rhinotia bispinosa (Perroud, 1853)
- Rhinotia brevipes (Lea, 1908)
- Rhinotia brunnea (Guérin-Méneville, 1838)
- Rhinotia centralis (Pascoe, 1872)
- Rhinotia corallina Pascoe, 1872
- Rhinotia cristata (Lea, 1908)
- Rhinotia cruenta Pascoe, 1870
- Rhinotia cylindrica (Lea, 1917)
- Rhinotia difficilis (Blackburn, 1893)
- Rhinotia distincta (Blackburn, 1893)
- Rhinotia divisa (Pascoe, 1885)
- Rhinotia edentula (Lea, 1899)
- Rhinotia elegans (Blackburn, 1893)
- Rhinotia exigua (Pascoe, 1873)
- Rhinotia exilis (Lea, 1917)
- Rhinotia farinaria (Pascoe, 1872)
- Rhinotia filiformis (Germar, 1848)
- Rhinotia flindersi (Blackburn, 1893)
- Rhinotia frater (Blackburn, 1893)
- Rhinotia granicollis (Lea, 1908)
- Rhinotia haemoptera Kirby, 1819
- Rhinotia halmaturina (Lea, 1917)
- Rhinotia helmsi (Blackburn, 1893)
- Rhinotia hemisticta (Germar, 1848)
- Rhinotia inconstans (Lea, 1908)
- Rhinotia insipida (Blackburn, 1889)
- Rhinotia irrorata (Jekel, 1860)
- Rhinotia lacustris (Lea, 1917)
- Rhinotia lineata (Donovan, 1805)
- Rhinotia marginella Boheman, 1839
- Rhinotia melanocephala (Boheman, 1839)
- Rhinotia mimica (Lea, 1917)
- Rhinotia multimaculata (Lea, 1917)
- Rhinotia niveopilosa (Lea, 1908)
- Rhinotia orthodoxa (Lea, 1917)
- Rhinotia parallela (Pascoe, 1872)
- Rhinotia parva Lea, 1908
- Rhinotia perplexa (Blackburn, 1893)
- Rhinotia pica (Jekel, 1860)
- Rhinotia pictirostris (Lea, 1908)
- Rhinotia plagiata (Pascoe, 1870)
- Rhinotia podagrosa (Lea, 1917)
- Rhinotia povera (Lea, 1917)
- Rhinotia princeps Zimmerman, 1994
- Rhinotia pruinosa Pascoe, 1871
- Rhinotia pudica (Lea, 1899)
- Rhinotia pulverulenta (Lea, 1908)
- Rhinotia regalis (Blackburn, 1893)
- Rhinotia ruficornis (Lea, 1908)
- Rhinotia scalaris (Germar, 1848)
- Rhinotia semipunctata (Fabricius, 1775)
- Rhinotia serpens (Pascoe, 1870)
- Rhinotia simplicipennis Lea, 1908
- Rhinotia sparsa (Germar, 1848)
- Rhinotia subparallela (Jekel, 1860)
- Rhinotia subsuturalis (Lea, 1908)
- Rhinotia suturalis (MacLeay, 1826)
- Rhinotia tenuis (Lea, 1899)
- Rhinotia ursa (Lea, 1910)
- Rhinotia variabilis (Lea, 1917)
- Rhinotia venusta Pascoe, 1872
- Rhinotia vetusta (Pascoe, 1870)
- Rhinotia villosa (Lea, 1917)
