= Symphyomethes =

Scientific classification
- Domain: Eukaryota
- Kingdom: Animalia
- Phylum: Arthropoda
- Class: Insecta
- Order: Coleoptera
- Suborder: Polyphaga
- Infraorder: Elateriformia
- Family: Omethidae
- Subfamily: Omethinae
- Genus: Symphyomethes; Wittmer, 1970

Genus of beetles

Symphyomethes is a genus of false soldier beetles in the family Omethidae, containing two described species.

== Species ==
- Symphyomethes blandulus Wittmer, 1970
- Symphyomethes californicus Wittmer, 1970
