= Protomelittomma =

Protomelittomma insulare

Scientific classification
- Kingdom: Animalia
- Phylum: Arthropoda
- Clade: Pancrustacea
- Class: Insecta
- Order: Coleoptera
- Suborder: Polyphaga
- Infraorder: Cucujiformia
- Family: Lymexylidae
- Genus: Protomelittomma; Wheeler, 1986
- Species: P. insulare

Binomial name
- Protomelittomma insulare (Fairmaire, 1893)

Genus of beetles

Protomelittomma insulare is a species of beetle in the family Lymexylidae, the only species in the genus Protomelittomma.
