= Elateroides =

Scientific classification
- Kingdom: Animalia
- Phylum: Arthropoda
- Class: Insecta
- Order: Coleoptera
- Suborder: Polyphaga
- Infraorder: Cucujiformia
- Family: Lymexylidae
- Genus: Elateroides; Schaeffer, 1766

Synonyms
- Hylecoetus Latreille, 1806; Hylicetus Berthold, 1827 (Lapsus calami); Xylecoethus Gyllenhal, 1827 (Lapsus calami); Hyloceotus Melsheimer, 1853 (Lapsus calami); Hyloecotus Lacordaire, 1857 (Lapsus calami); Hylecerus Jacquelin du Val, 1863 (Lapsus calami)

Genus of beetles

Elateroides is a genus of rarely found beetles in the family Lymexylidae, containing the following species:

== Species ==
- Elateroides dermestoides (Linnaeus, 1761)
- Elateroides flabellicornis (Schneider, 1791)
- Elateroides lugubris (Say, 1835)

== Taxonomy ==
Nardi 2019 writes (p. 597) "Bollow (1940: 867) described Hylecoetus dermestoides L. ab. nigrocephalus, H. dermestoides L. ab. Reitteri and H. dermestoides L. ab. Stoeckleini from Germany, but they are unavailable infrasubspecific names."
