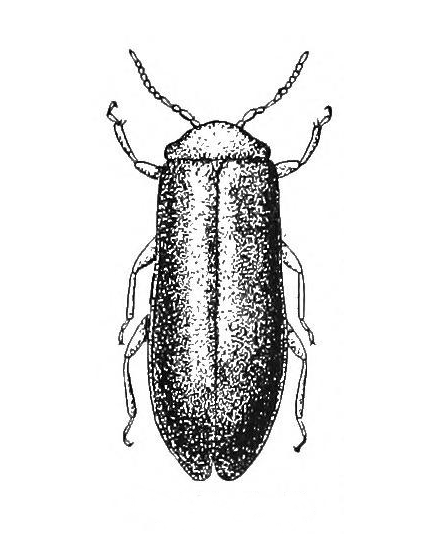
- Blatchleya gracilis

Scientific classification
- Domain: Eukaryota
- Kingdom: Animalia
- Phylum: Arthropoda
- Class: Insecta
- Order: Coleoptera
- Suborder: Polyphaga
- Infraorder: Elateriformia
- Family: Omethidae
- Subfamily: Omethinae
- Genus: Blatchleya; Knab, 1910
- Species: B. gracilis

Binomial name
- Blatchleya gracilis (Blatchley, 1910)

Synonyms
- Blanchardia gracilis Blatchley, 1910

= Blatchleya =

Genus of beetles

Blatchleya is a genus of false soldier beetles in the family Omethidae, containing a single described species, B. gracilis.
