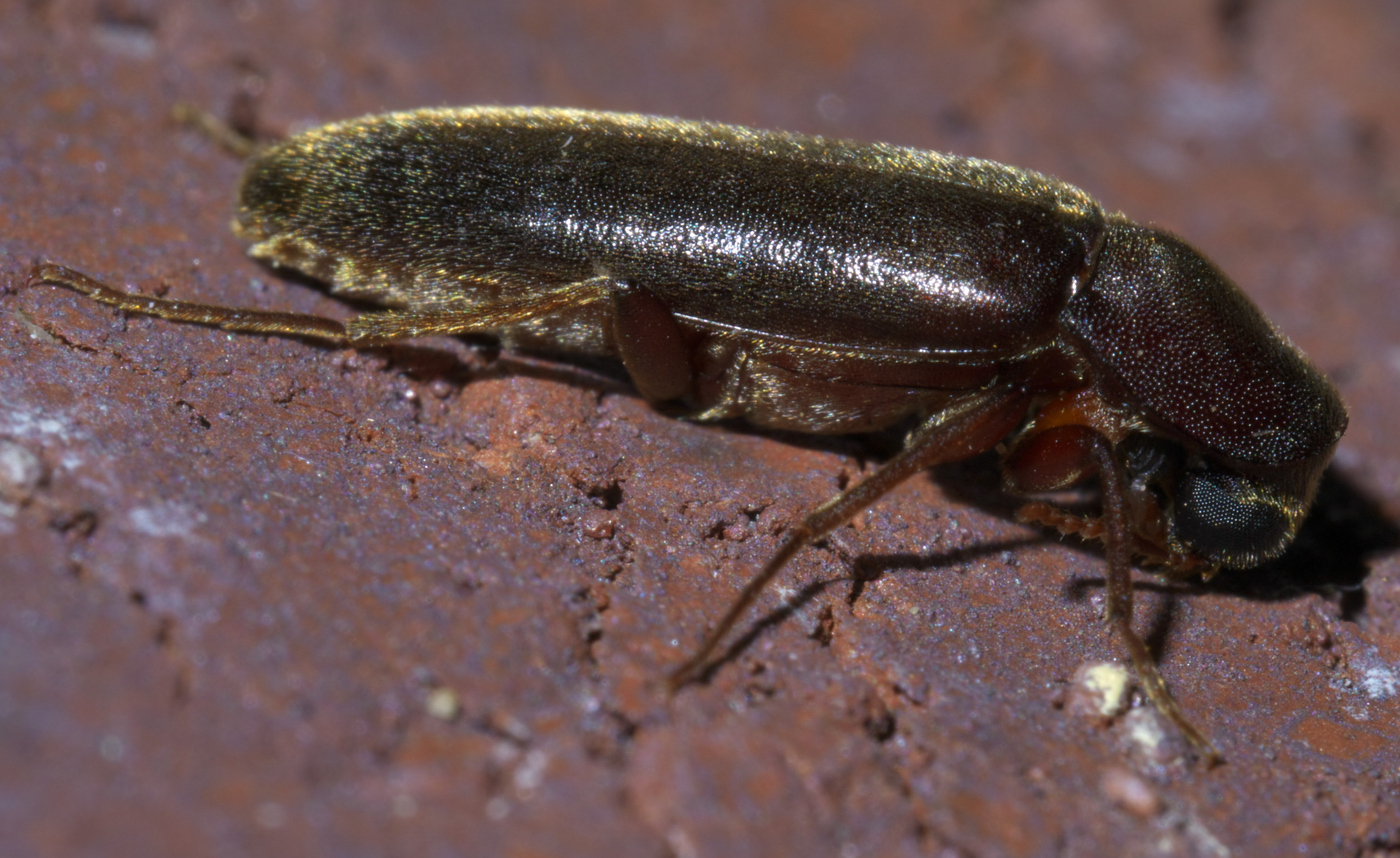

Scientific classification
- Kingdom: Animalia
- Phylum: Arthropoda
- Class: Insecta
- Order: Coleoptera
- Suborder: Polyphaga
- Infraorder: Cucujiformia
- Family: Lymexylidae
- Genus: Melittomma
- Species: M. sericeum

Binomial name
- Melittomma sericeum (Harris, 1841)

= Melittomma sericeum =

Species of beetle

Melittomma sericeum, the chestnut timberworm, is a species of ship-timber beetle in the family Lymexylidae. It is found in North America.

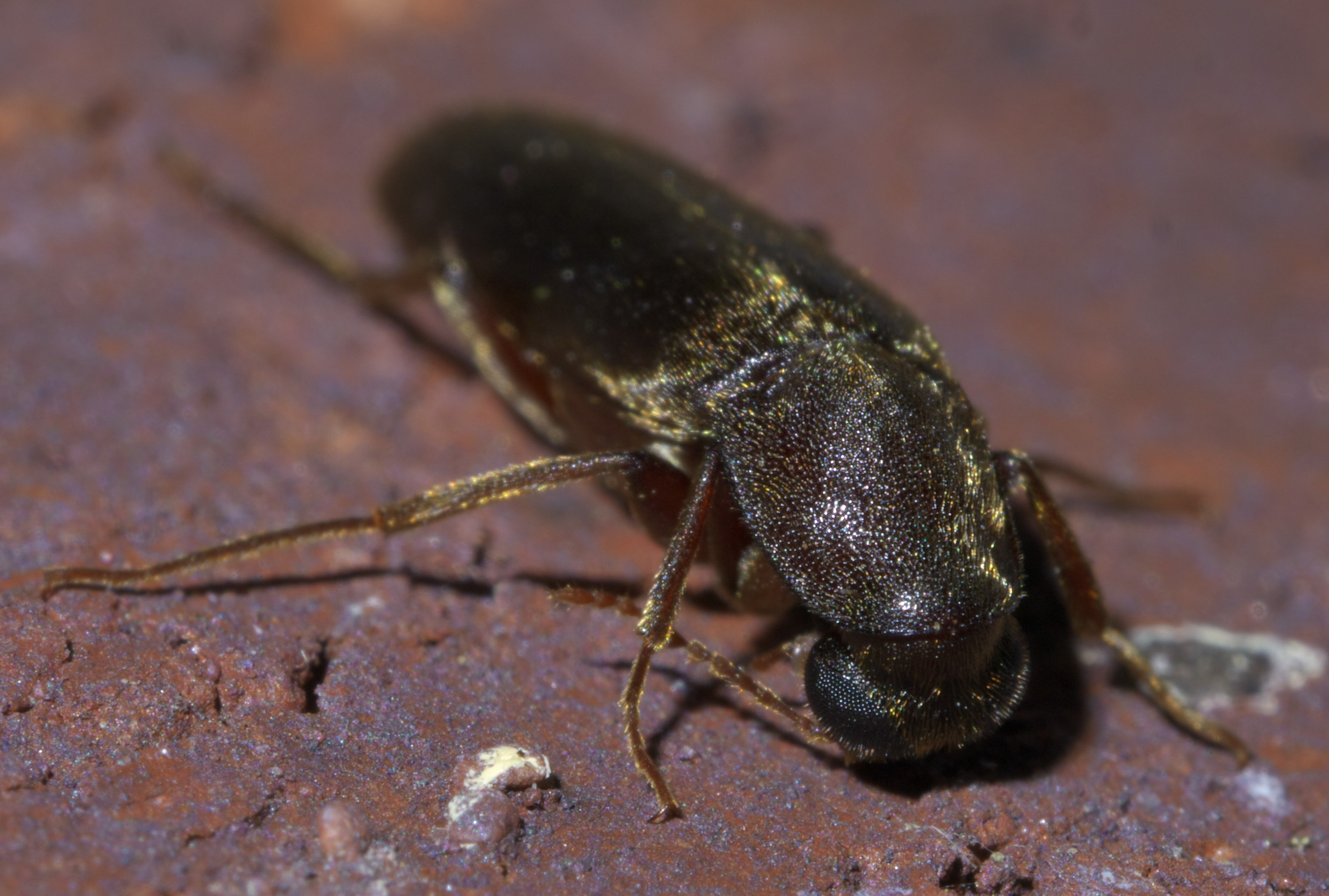
Chestnut Timberworm, Melittomma sericeum, Pryor, OK, USA
