= Ginglymocladus =

Scientific classification
- Kingdom: Animalia
- Phylum: Arthropoda
- Class: Insecta
- Order: Coleoptera
- Suborder: Polyphaga
- Infraorder: Elateriformia
- Family: Omethidae
- Subfamily: Matheteinae
- Genus: Ginglymocladus; Van Dyke, 1918

Genus of beetles

Ginglymocladus is a genus of false soldier beetles in the family Omethidae. There are at least two described species in Ginglymocladus.

== Species ==
- Ginglymocladus discoidea Van Dyke, 1918
- Ginglymocladus luteicollis Van Dyke, 1918
