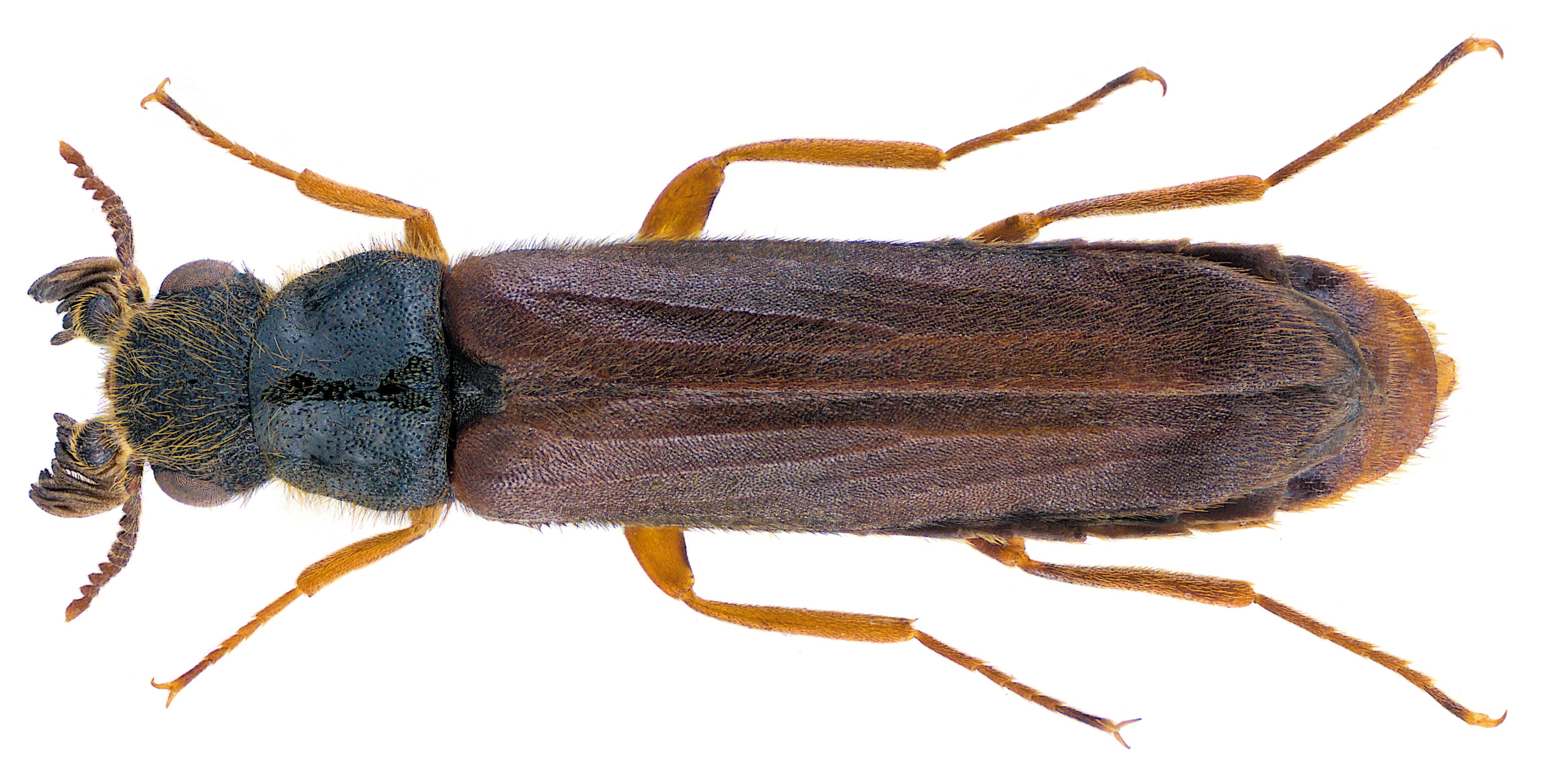
- Elateroides dermestoides

Scientific classification
- Kingdom: Animalia
- Phylum: Arthropoda
- Class: Insecta
- Order: Coleoptera
- Suborder: Polyphaga
- Infraorder: Cucujiformia
- Family: Lymexylidae
- Genus: Elateroides
- Species: E. dermestoides

Binomial name
- Elateroides dermestoides (Linnaeus, 1761)

Synonyms
- Hylecoetus dermestoides (Linnaeus, 1761)

= Elateroides dermestoides =

Species of beetle

Elateroides dermestoides is a species of ship-timber beetles native to Europe.

Eiablage

== Description ==
The beetles are 6 to 18 millimeters (0.24 to 0.71 in) long. The females are yellow-brown. The colouring of the males differ greatly, but the majority are black. The males have characteristic maxillary palpi in which the second segment bears a large outgrowth with many long extensions. This outgrowth and the sensory hairs with cover it may help the males locate females. The pronotum of the beetles is margined.

The larvae are 14 to 20 millimeters (0.55 to 0.79 in) long and have slender, white, soft bodies. Their mandibles are spoon-shaped, and they have no eyes. The prothorax extends forward and is like a hood, and the last abdominal segment forms a long point. This spike distinguishes it from the larvae of Lymexylon navale, which does not have this feature. Hylecoetus flabellicornis is also similar in appearance, but it is rare.

== Distribution ==
The beetles are found throughout Europe and are less common in Southern Europe.

== Living habits ==
The beetles may be found from the beginning of April to July. They live only two to four days.

The larvae live in the vicinity of broad-leaved trees and coniferous trees, especially beech, oak, birch, fir and pine. They feed on the hyphae of the fungus Alloascoidea hylecoeti, which they scrape up with their spoon-like mandibles.

Particularly from May to June, the female lays about 100 eggs in groups of 6 to 40 in the bark or the crevices of trees. She does this on the shady side of newly felled trees or tree stumps that have not dried out. Deposition in living trees is rare, but when it occurs, it greatly damages the tree. The female coats her eggs with fungal spores that are stored in a special pouch on the ovipositor. After 10 to 14 days, the larvae hatch, which usually occurs in June. First, they roll in the fungal spores, coating their bodies with it. Then, they bore into the wood and distribute the spores along the walls of the tunnels. The tunnels start out small and grow with the growth of the larva. The tunnels quickly grow black with the growth of the fungal mycelia, which usually run radially in the stump but sometimes also parallel to the surface and are approximately 30 centimeters long. Using the special abdominal extension, the larvae toss sawdust out of the tunnel so that the fungus can grow. When they overwinter, they close up the bore hole. Typically, the animals pupate after two or three years, occasionally after one year. In April, after one or two overwinterings, the larva digs a pupation chamber near a bore hole covered by bark. The larva seals off the chamber with some bore dust. The adult beetle emerges after 7 days.

== Other information ==
Elateroides dermestoides is important for the removal of dead wood in forests. However, it can be a major source of damage in the timber industry. An infestation can be detected by peeling back the bark and noting holes of various sizes bored by the larvae. Also, the tunnels are coloured black by Endomyces hylecoeti fungus. Infestation can be avoided by promptly removing the wood from the forest and allowing it to dry out.

== Literature ==
- Jiři Zahradník, Irmgard Jung, Dieter Jung et al.: Käfer Mittel- und Nordwesteuropas, Parey Berlin 1985, ISBN 3-490-27118-1 ("Beetles of Central and Northwest Europe")
- Edmund Reitter: Fauna Germanica – Die Käfer des Deutschen Reiches. Band 3 S. 299, K. G. Lutz, Stuttgart 1911 ("Fauna Germanica – The Beetles of the German World", Band 3)
- Edmund Reitter: Fauna Germanica – Die Käfer des Deutschen Reiches. 5 Bände, Stuttgart K. G. Lutz 1908 - 1916, Digitale Bibliothek Band 134, Directmedia Publishing GmbH, Berlin 2006, ISBN 3-89853-534-7 ("Fauna Germanica – The Beetles of the German World", Band 5)
