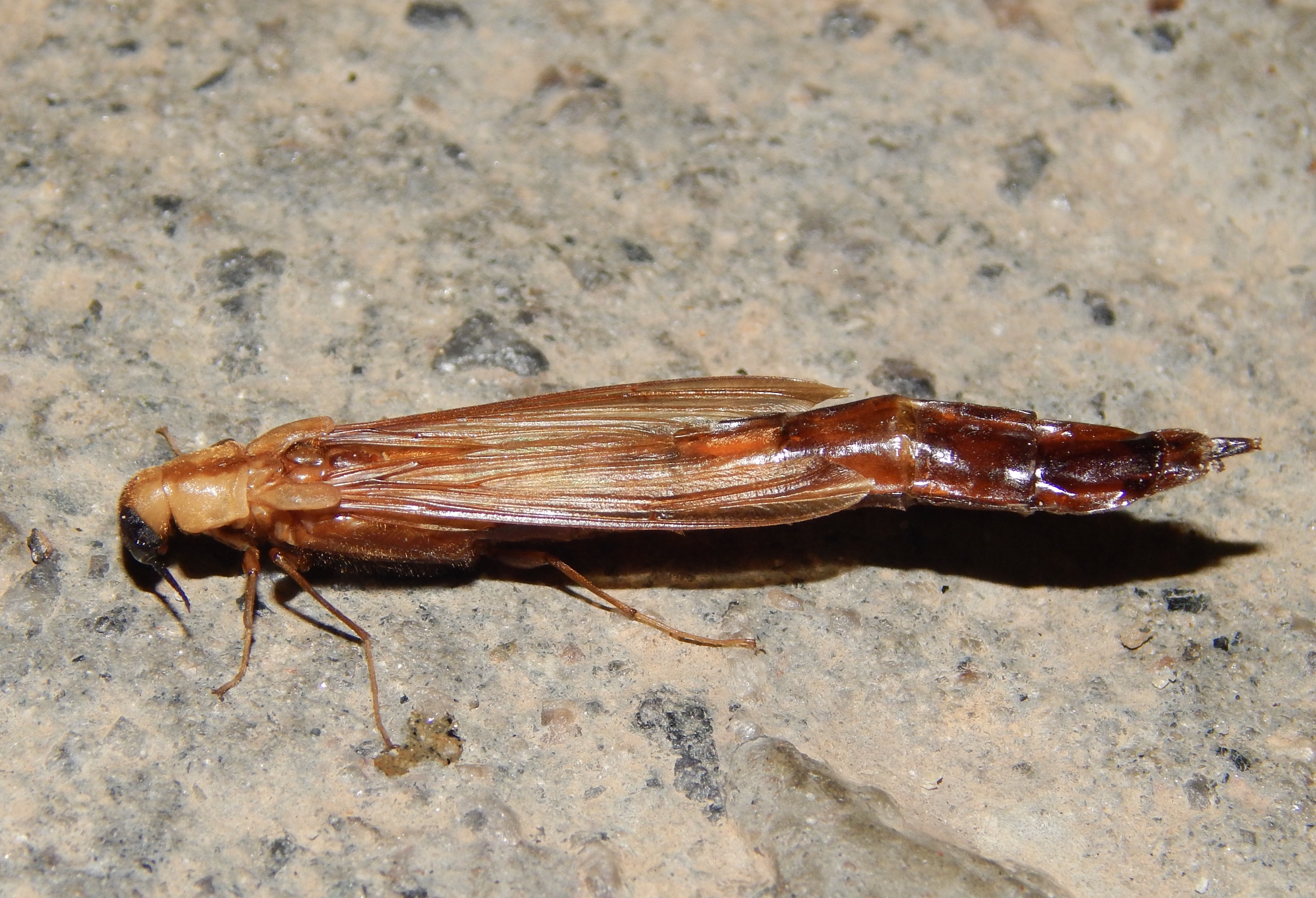
- Atractocerus sp. from Western ghats of India

Scientific classification
- Domain: Eukaryota
- Kingdom: Animalia
- Phylum: Arthropoda
- Class: Insecta
- Order: Coleoptera
- Suborder: Polyphaga
- Infraorder: Cucujiformia
- Superfamily: Lymexyloidea
- Family: Lymexylidae
- Genus: Atractocerus; Palisot de Beauvois, 1801

Synonyms
- Atractourus Palisot de Beauvois, 1801 (Lapsus calami); Fusicornis Philippi, 1866; Arractocetus Kurosawa, 1985; Hymaloxylon Kurosawa, 1985; Raractocetus Kurosawa, 1985

= Atractocerus =

Genus of beetles

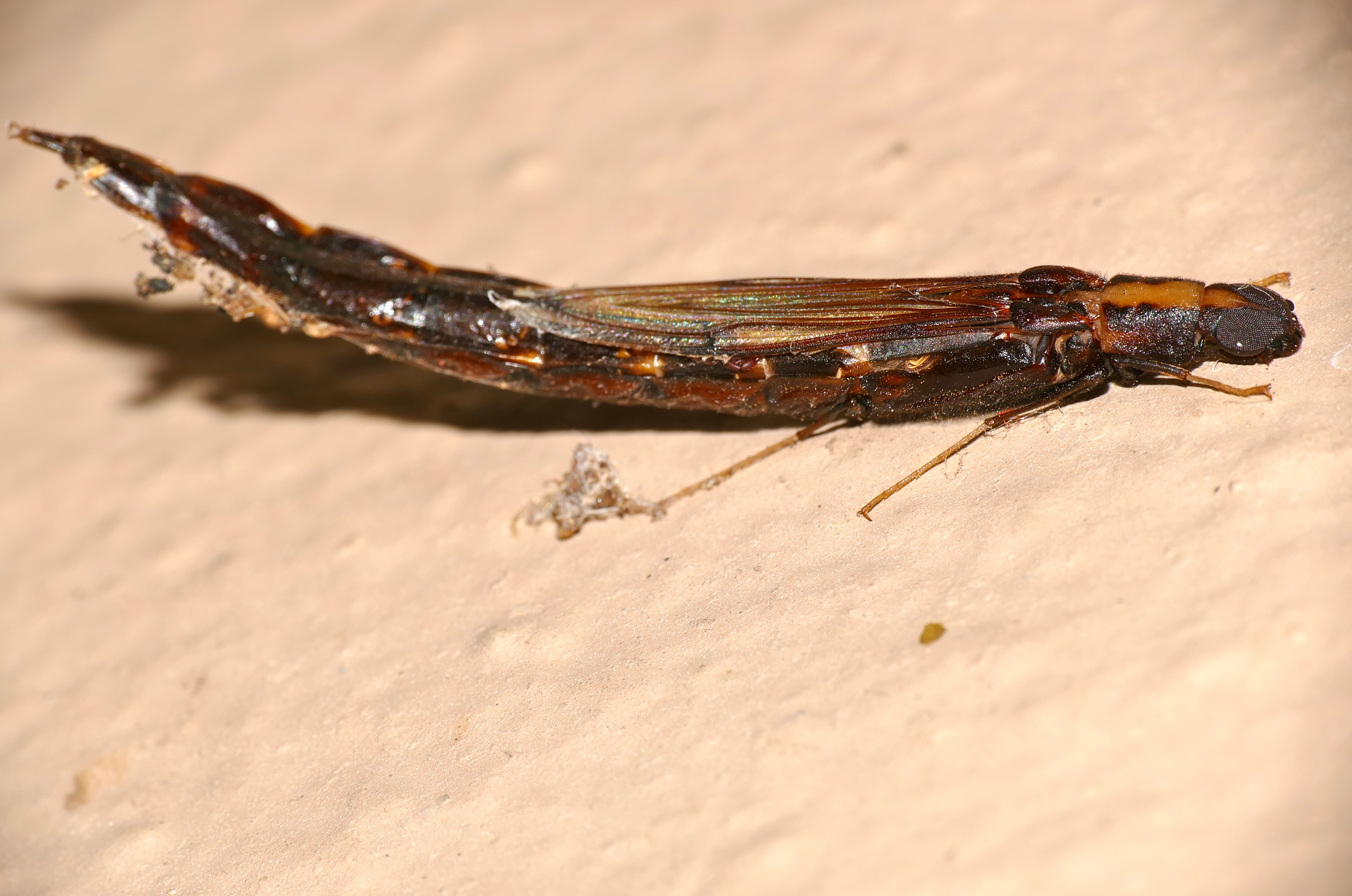
Atractocerus brevicornis, South Africa

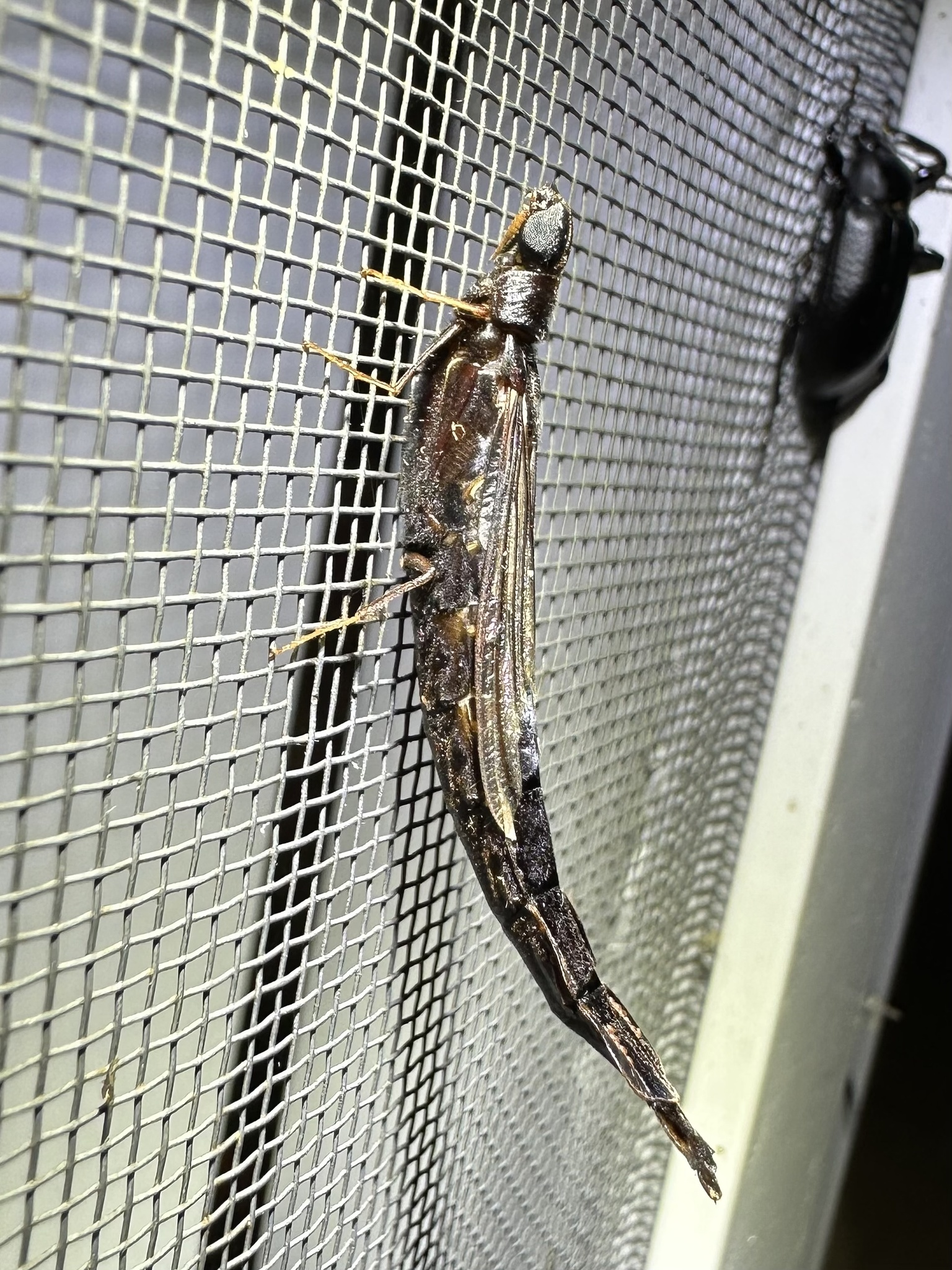
Atractocerus brasiliensis, México

Atractocerus is a genus of ship-timber beetles in the family Lymexylidae.

The most recent revision of the family treats several small or monotypic genera as synonyms of Atractocerus, though some authors continue to use the older generic names (e.g.).

== Species ==
These 26 species belong to the genus Atractocerus:

- Atractocerus aspoecki (Paulus, 2004)
- Atractocerus ater Kraatz, 1895
- Atractocerus atricollis Pic, 1955
- Atractocerus bicolor Strohmeyer, 1910
- Atractocerus bifasciatus Gestro, 1874
- Atractocerus blairi Gardner, 1936
- Atractocerus brasiliensis Lepeletier & Audinet-Serville, 1825
- Atractocerus brevicornis (Linnaeus, 1766)
- Atractocerus bruijni Gestro, 1874
- Atractocerus crassicornis Clark, 1931
- Atractocerus emarginatus Laporte de Castelnau, 1836
- Atractocerus gracilicornis Schenkling, 1914
- Atractocerus kreuslerae Pascoe, 1864
- Atractocerus mirabilis Miwa, 1935
- Atractocerus monticola Kurosawa, 1985
- Atractocerus morio Pascoe, 1860
- Atractocerus niger Strohmeyer, 1910
- Atractocerus nipponicus (Nakane, 1985)
- Atractocerus procerus Schenkling, 1914
- Atractocerus quercus Gardner, 1935
- Atractocerus reversus Walker, 1858
- Atractocerus siebersi Karny, 1922
- Atractocerus tasmaniensis Lea, 1917
- Atractocerus termiticola Wasmann, 1902
- Atractocerus tonkineus Pic, 1948
- Atractocerus victoriensis Blackburn, 1891
