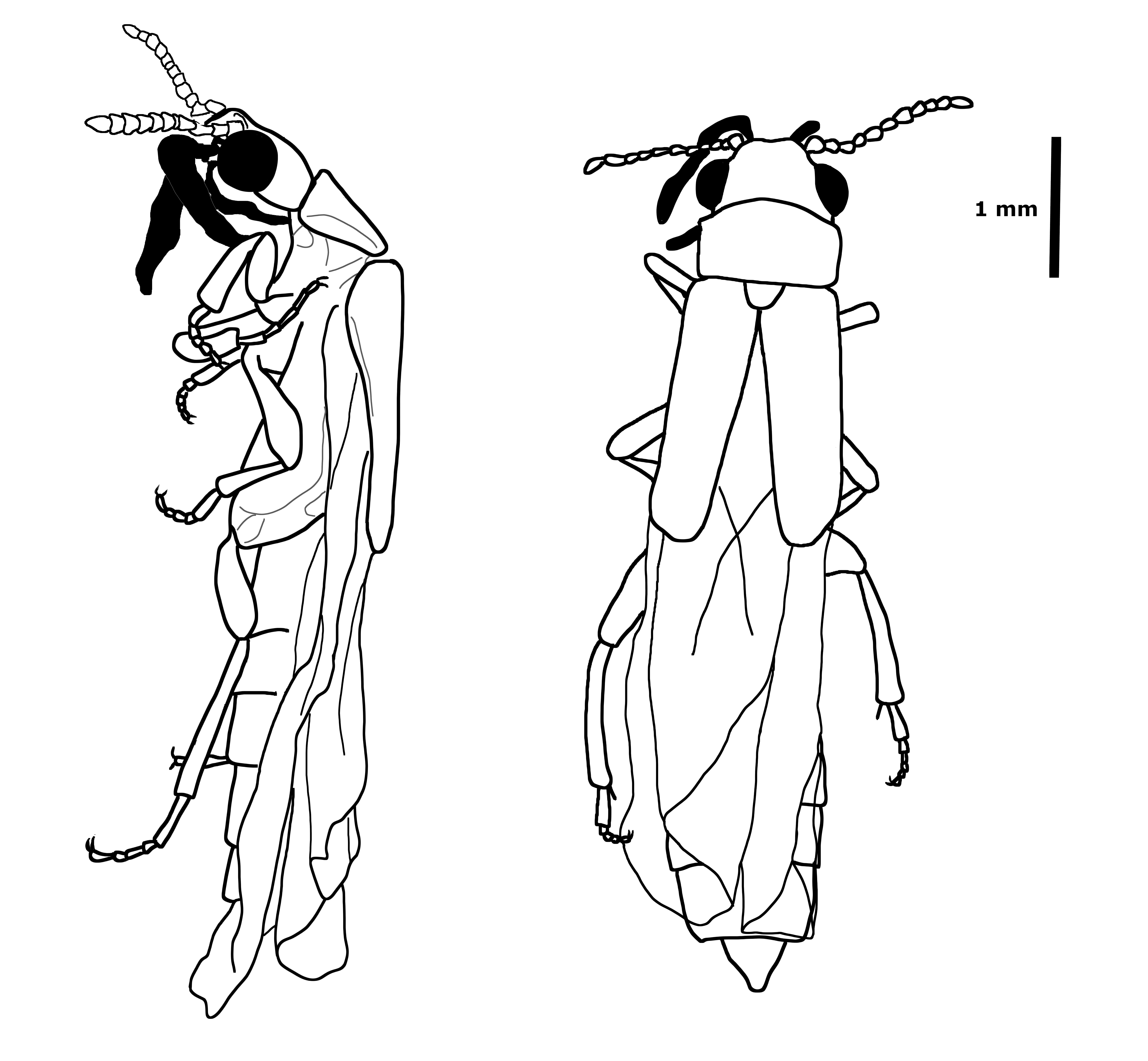
- Illustration of a male Telegeusis, Cornell University Insect Collection

Scientific classification
- Kingdom: Animalia
- Phylum: Arthropoda
- Class: Insecta
- Order: Coleoptera
- Suborder: Polyphaga
- Infraorder: Elateriformia
- Family: Omethidae
- Genus: Telegeusis; Horn, 1895

Species
- See text

= Telegeusis =

Genus of beetles

Telegeusis is a genus of beetles in the family Omethidae, formerly considered to belong in a separate family "Telegeusidae".

== Species ==
- Telegeusis austellus Zaragoza-Caballero & Rodriguez-Velez, 2011
- Telegeusis boreios Zaragoza-Caballero & Rodriguez-Velez, 2011
- Telegeusis chamelensis Zaragoza-Caballero, 1975
- Telegeusis debilis Horn, 1895
- Telegeusis glessum Zaragoza-Caballero & Rodriguez-Velez, 2011
- Telegeusis granulatus Zaragoza-Caballero & Rodriguez-Velez, 2011
- Telegeusis nubifer Martin, 1932
- Telegeusis orientalis Zaragoza-Caballero, 1990
- Telegeusis panamaensis Allen & Hutton, 1969
- Telegeusis schwarzi Barber, 1952
- Telegeusis sonorensis Zaragoza-Caballero & Rodriguez-Velez, 2011
- Telegeusis texensis Fleenor & Taber, 2001 (Texas long-lipped beetle)
