= Arthur Sidney Olliff =

19th century Australian naturalist

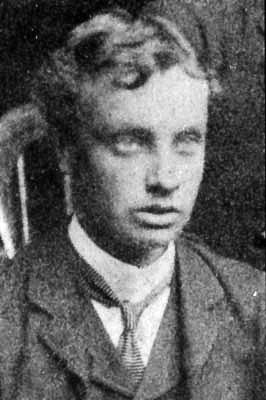
- Born: 21 October 1865; England
- Died: 29 December 1895; Australia
- Scientific career
- Fields: Entomology

Arthur Sidney Olliff (21 October 1865 – 29 December 1895) was an Australian taxonomist who was active as Government entomologist in New South Wales. He came to Australia in December 1884 to work at the Australian Museum.

== Discoveries ==
- Rhinotia acrobeles (1889)

== Publications ==
- A chapter on collecting and preserving insects - Arthur Sidney Olliff (1889)
- Australian butterflies : a brief account of the native families : with a chapter on collecting & preserving insects - Arthur Sidney Olliff (1889)
- The Mesozoic and Tertiary Insects of New South Wales - Robert Etheridge, Junior, Arthur Sidney Olliff (1890)
- Insect pests. The maize moth (Heliothris armigera, Hub.) - Arthur Sidney Olliff (1890)
- Insect pests. The codling moth (Carpocapsa pomonella, Linn.) - Arthur Sidney Olliff (1890)
- Insect friends and foes : [lady-birds, or, Coccinellidae - Arthur Sidney Olliff (1891)
- The codling moth, Carpocapsa pomonella, Linn. : its life-history and habits - Arthur Sidney Olliff (1892)
- Australian Entomophytes Or Entomogenous Fungi, and Some Account of Their Insect Hosts - Arthur Sidney Olliff (1895)
- A.S. Olliff (31 December 1889). "The insect fauna of Lord Howe Island". The Australian Museum Memoir. 2: 77–98. doi:10.3853/J.0067-1967.2.1889.482. ISSN 0067-1967. Wikidata Q103898587.
