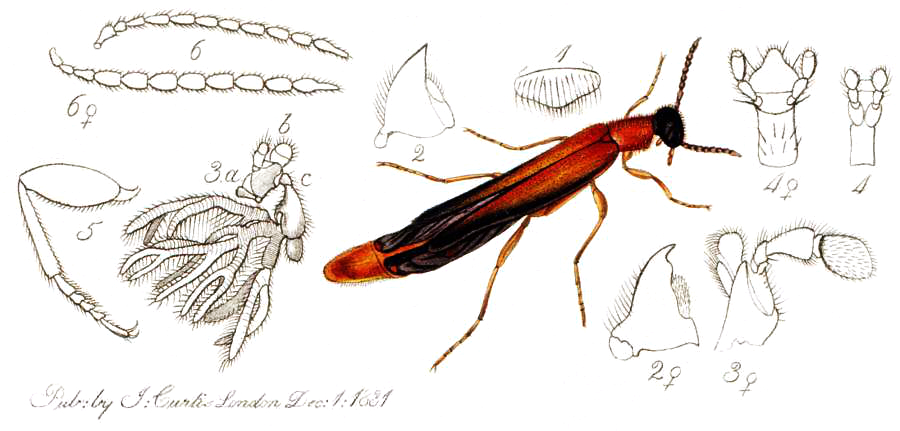
- Lymexylon navale

Scientific classification
- Kingdom: Animalia
- Phylum: Arthropoda
- Clade: Pancrustacea
- Class: Insecta
- Order: Coleoptera
- Suborder: Polyphaga
- Infraorder: Cucujiformia
- Superfamily: Lymexyloidea
- Family: Lymexylidae; Fleming, 1821

Subfamilies
- Atractocerinae; Hylecoetinae; Lymexylinae; Melittommatinae

= Lymexylidae =

Ship-timber beetles Temporal range: Aptian–Recent

Family of wood-boring beetles

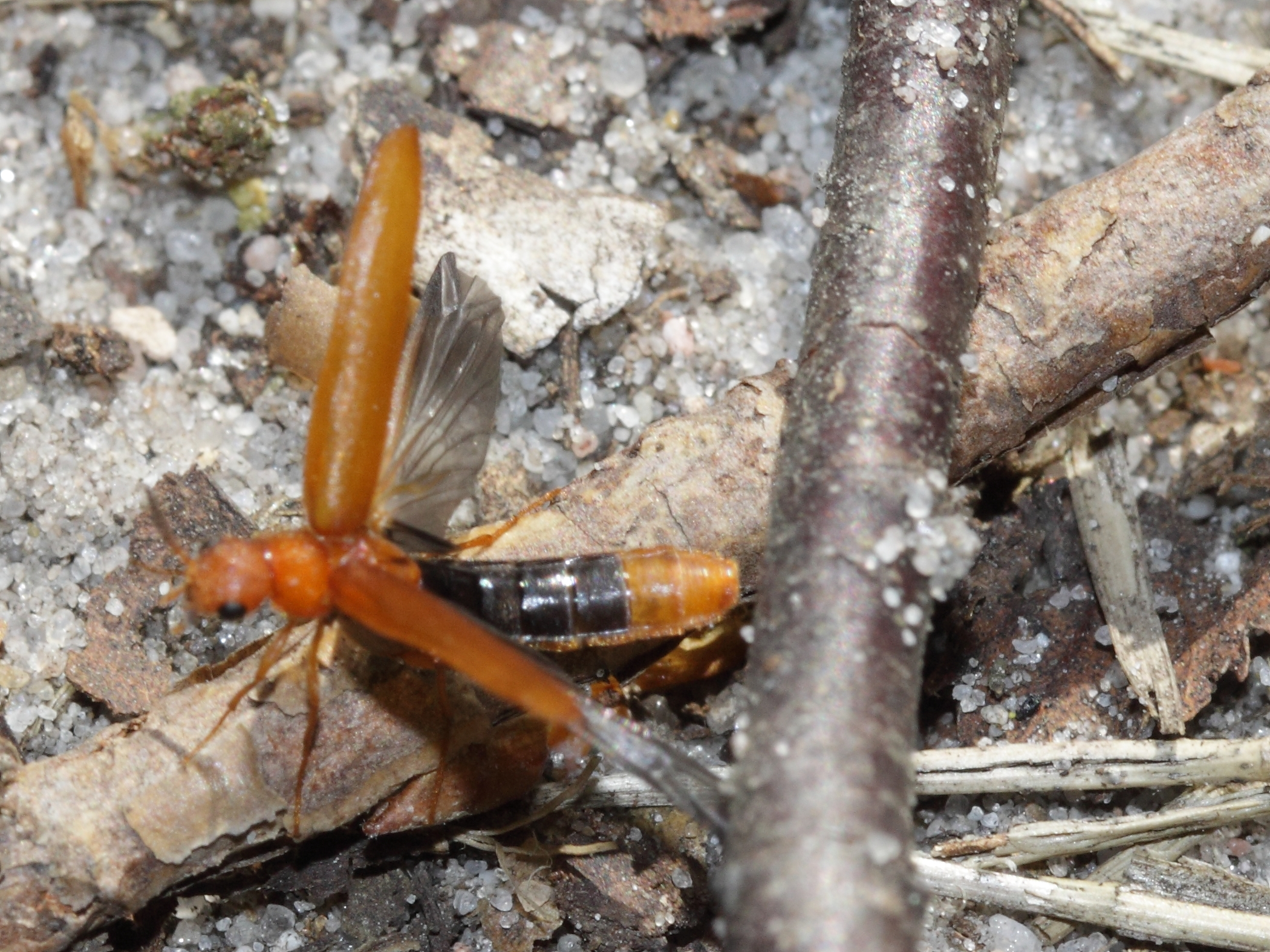
An adult Hylecoetus dermestoides

The Lymexylidae (historically often spelled Lymexylonidae), also known as ship-timber beetles, are a family of wood-boring beetles. Lymexylidae belong to the suborder Polyphaga and are the sole member of the superfamily Lymexyloidea.

== Habitat and behavior ==
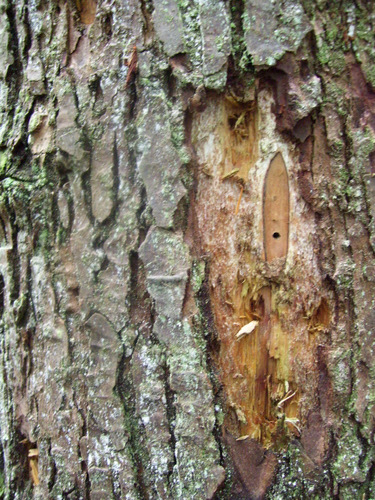
Example of an infested tree

Lymexylon, Elateroides, and Melittomma are pests to forest trees such as chestnut, poplar, and oak, and can be found worldwide. Some species are parasitic, causing decay in living trees and damaging timber structures such as houses and ships. Wood boring activities occur primarily in the larva stage, with the larvae damaging both sapwood and heartwood. Lymexylidae larvae bore into living and decaying wood where they consume the fungus Alloascoidea hylecoeti.

=== Symbiotic relationship with fungi ===
Lymexylidae larvae have a symbiotic association with certain types of fungi. The fungi grow in sheltered environments where they are tended by the larvae, such as the holes burrowed into the wood and, in return, the larvae feed on the fungi.

Elateroides dermestoides lays eggs into boreholes of bark beetles on a fallen beech

Specifically, this species has evolved a relationship with the yeast-like fungus Endomyces hylecoeti. Every egg the female lays is coated with fungal spores from a pouch near her ovipositor. The larvae hatch and subsequently collect some of the spores by remaining close to the egg shells for a period of time, before tunneling further into the wood. The fungi grow on the tunnel walls created by the larvae. The larvae then consume the fungus, rather than the wood itself. As the fungi require air flow to grow, the larvae ensure the tunnels are free of any debris.

== Species and genera ==
Lymexylidae contains the following genera:

- Subfamily Atractocerinae
  - †Anancites Perkovsky, 2022 (= Adamas Chen & Zhang, 2020) – Burmese amber, Myanmar, Late Cretaceous (Cenomanian)
  - Atractocerus Palisot de Beauvois, 1801
  - †Cratoatractocerus Wolf-Schwenninger 2011 – Crato Formation, Brazil, Early Cretaceous (Aptian)
  - †Cretoquadratus Chen 2019 – Burmese amber, Myanmar, Cenomanian
  - †Eoractocetinus Kirejtshuk, 2025 – Burmese amber, Myanmar, Cenomanian
  - †Eoractocetus Kirejtshuk, 2025 – Baltic amber, Eocene
  - †Lymexylopsis Kirejtshuk, 2025 – Baltic amber, Eocene; Rovno amber, Ukraine, Eocene
  - †Paratractocerus Nazarenko & Perkovsky, 2021 – Baltic amber, Eocene
  - Urtea Paulus, 2004
  - †Vetatractocerus Yamamoto 2019 – Burmese amber, Myanmar, Cenomanian
- Subfamily Hylecoetinae
  - Elateroides Schaeffer, 1766
- Subfamily Lymexylinae
  - Lymexylon Fabricius, 1775
- Subfamily Melittommatinae
  - Australymexylon Wheeler, 1986
  - Melittomma Murray, 1867
  - Melittommopsis Lane, 1955
  - †Ponomarenkylon Kirejtshuk 2008 – Baltic amber, Eocene
  - Protomelittomma Wheeler, 1986

There are over 60 species in these genera, including:

- The ship timber beetle, Lymexylon navale
- Two species are located in Eastern US and Canada: the sapwood timberworm Elateroides lugubris (Say) and the chestnut timberworm, Melittomma sericeum

== Morphology ==
Adult morphology:

- 5–40 mm (0.20–1.6 in) long; elongate to slender, parallel-sided, vestiture consisting of fine setae; conspicuously necked to not necked; somewhat waisted.
- Head short, typically narrowed behind large protruding eyes forming a slight neck; surface punctate, with or without epicranial pit.
- Antennae short 11-segmented, filiform/serrate and often sexually dimorphic.
- Maxillary palpi 4-segmented, simple in most females, and with apical segment modified into a complex flabellate or plumose organ in males-palporgan.
- Tarsi 5-5-5 with legs slender, moderately long.
- Hind-leg coxae extending laterally to meet the elytra (Lymexylon), or not markedly extended laterally (Elateroides).
- Elytra individually tapered to their apices to not individually tapered; fairly short, exposing several terminal abdominal 1-3 tergites; all articulated and moveable.
- Wings with fairly complete venation, radial cell short or absent.

Immature Morphology:

- Whitish-yellow, elongate, thin, cylindrical with short but well developed legs.
- Prognathous, stemmata absent or present may have eye spots.
- Abdominal modifications found in older larvae.

== Classification ==
The superfamily Lymexyloidea is currently within series Cucujiformia. The internal phylogeny has not been clearly understood/completed by experts. Morphological data places the family inside the Tenebrionoidea, while molecular data place it as sister taxon to Tenebrionoidea, and polyphyletic.

== See also ==
- Forest pathology
