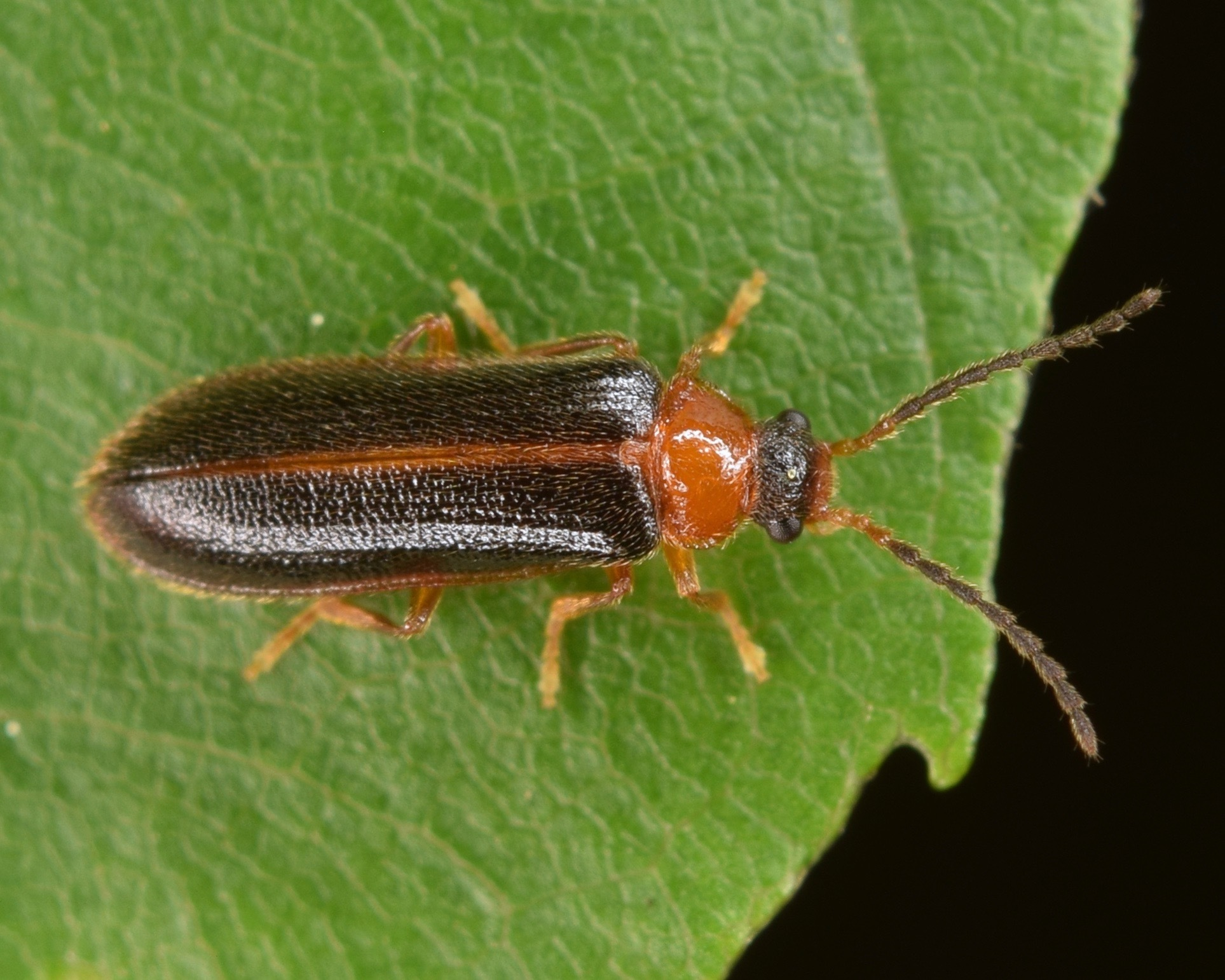
- Omethes marginatus

Scientific classification
- Kingdom: Animalia
- Phylum: Arthropoda
- Clade: Pancrustacea
- Class: Insecta
- Order: Coleoptera
- Suborder: Polyphaga
- Infraorder: Elateriformia
- Superfamily: Elateroidea
- Family: Omethidae; LeConte, 1861

= Omethidae =

Family of beetles

Omethidae is a family of Elateroidea sometimes known as the false soldier beetles. They are native to South, Southeast and Eastern Asia and the Americas. Their biology is obscure and their larvae are unknown. They appear to inhabit vegetation in or surrounding forests, and are probably active during the day.

== Classification and taxonomy ==
There are some 40 species in 11 genera, divided into four subfamilies. Long-lipped beetles (Telegeusinae) were formerly treated as a family Telegeusidae but are most recently treated as a subfamily within Omethidae. According to other recent studies, Phengodidae might possibly include (or be sister taxon to) the telegeusines.

=== Subfamily Driloniinae ===
- Drilonius

=== Subfamily Matheteinae ===
- Ginglymocladus
- Matheteus

=== Subfamily Omethinae ===
- Blatchleya
- Malthomethes
- Omethes
- Symphyomethes
- Troglomethes

=== Subfamily Telegeusinae ===
- Pseudokarumia
- Pseudotelegeusis
- Telegeusis
