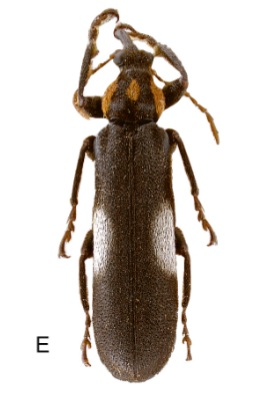

Scientific classification
- Kingdom: Animalia
- Phylum: Arthropoda
- Class: Insecta
- Order: Coleoptera
- Suborder: Polyphaga
- Infraorder: Cucujiformia
- Family: Belidae
- Genus: Homalocerus
- Species: H. bimaculatus

Binomial name
- Homalocerus bimaculatus Vanin, 2014

= Homalocerus bimaculatus =

Species of beetle

Homalocerus bimaculatus is a species of beetle of the family Belidae. This species is found in Brazil (São Paulo).

== Description ==
Adults reach a length of about 11 mm. They have a black head and testaceous antennae. The pronotum has three areas of carmine pubescence and the elytra are black with two lateral, postmedian, oval spots consisting of whitish pubescence.

== Etymology ==
The epithet refers to the two whitish elytral spots.
