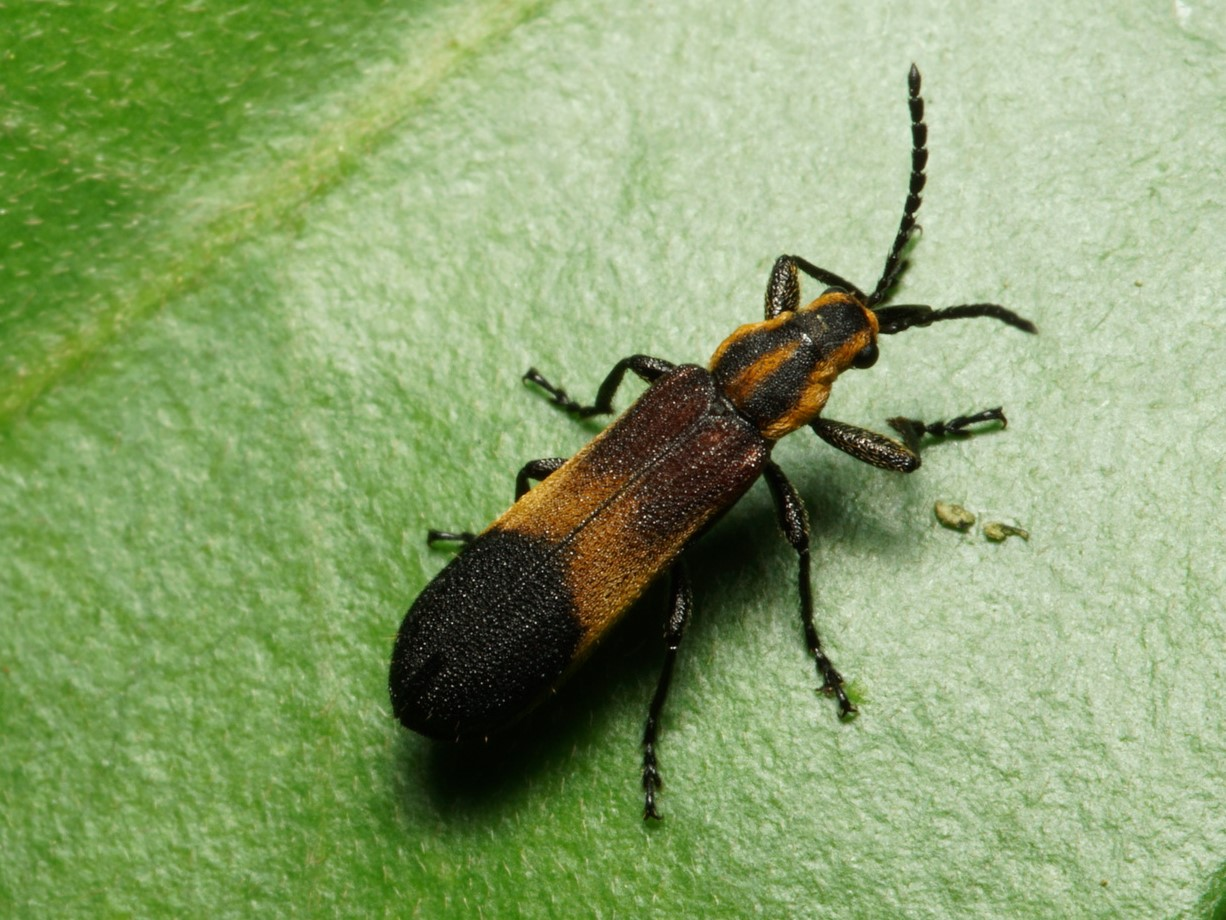
- Homalocerus xixim

Scientific classification
- Kingdom: Animalia
- Phylum: Arthropoda
- Class: Insecta
- Order: Coleoptera
- Suborder: Polyphaga
- Infraorder: Cucujiformia
- Family: Belidae
- Subfamily: Belinae
- Genus: Homalocerus; C.J.Schoenherr, 1839

= Homalocerus =

Genus of beetles

Homalocerus is a genus of beetles in the family Belidae.

== Species ==
The following species are recognised in the genus Homalocerus:

- Homalocerus acuminatus Boheman, 1845
- Homalocerus albidivarius L.Fairmaire & P.Germain, 1860
- Homalocerus antennalis Hustache, 1941
- Homalocerus argus L.Fairmaire & P.Germain, 1860
- Homalocerus balteatus L.Fairmaire & P.Germain, 1860
- Homalocerus bimaculatus Vanin, 2014
- Homalocerus exquisitus L.Fairmaire & P.Germain, 1860
- Homalocerus flavicornis Vanin, 1976
- Homalocerus longirostris Vanin, 1976
- Homalocerus lyciformis Bondar, 1947
- Homalocerus miltomerus Blanchard, 1849
- Homalocerus nigripennis Bondar, 1947
- Homalocerus plaumanni Voss, 1937
- Homalocerus punctum Bondar, 1947
- Homalocerus xixim Bondar, 1947
- Homalocerus zikani Bondar, 1947
