= List of cycad species by country =

Below is a list of cycad species ordered by country.

== Africa ==
=== Southern Africa ===
==== South Africa ====
- Encephalartos aemulans
- Encephalartos afer
- Encephalartos altensteinii
- Encephalartos arenarius
- Encephalartos brevifoliolatus
- Encephalartos cerinus
- Encephalartos cupidus
- Encephalartos cycadifolius
- Encephalartos dolomiticus
- Encephalartos dyerianus
- Encephalartos eugene-maraisii
- Encephalartos ferox
- Encephalartos friderici-guilielmi
- Encephalartos ghellinckii
- Encephalartos heenanii
- Encephalartos hirsutus
- Encephalartos horridus
- Encephalartos humilis
- Encephalartos inopinus
- Encephalartos laevifolius
- Encephalartos lanatus
- Encephalartos latifrons
- Encephalartos lebomboensis
- Encephalartos lehmannii
- Encephalartos longifolius
- Encephalartos middelburgensis
- Encephalartos msinganus
- Encephalartos natalensis
- Encephalartos ngoyanus
- Encephalartos nubimontanus
- Encephalartos paucidentatus
- Encephalartos princeps
- Encephalartos senticosus
- Encephalartos transvenosus
- Encephalartos trispinosus
- Encephalartos villosus
- Encephalartos woodii
- Stangeria eriopus

==== Eswatini ====
- Encephalartos aplanatus
- Encephalartos heenanii
- Encephalartos laevifolius
- Encephalartos lebomboensis
- Encephalartos ngoyanus
- Encephalartos paucidentatus
- Encephalartos relictus
- Encephalartos senticosus
- Encephalartos umbeluziensis
- Encephalartos villosus

==== Mozambique ====
- Cycas thouarsii
- Encephalartos chimanimaniensis
- Encephalartos ferox
- Encephalartos gratus
- Encephalartos lebomboensis
- Encephalartos manikensis
- Encephalartos munchii
- Encephalartos pterogonus
- Encephalartos turneri
- Encephalartos umbeluziensis

==== Malawi ====
- Encephalartos gratus

==== Zimbabwe ====
- Encephalartos chimanimaniensis
- Encephalartos concinnus
- Encephalartos manikensis

==== Zambia ====
- Encephalartos schmitzii

==== Angola ====
- Encephalartos laurentianus

==== Democratic Republic of the Congo ====
- Encephalartos laurentianus
- Encephalartos ituriensis
- Encephalartos marunguensis
- Encephalartos poggei
- Encephalartos schaijesii
- Encephalartos schmitzii

=== East Africa ===
Cycas thouarsii is the most geographically widespread species, and is found in Indian Ocean islands as well.

==== Tanzania ====
- Cycas thouarsii
- Encephalartos bubalinus
- Encephalartos delucanus
- Encephalartos hildebrandtii
- Encephalartos sclavoi

==== Kenya ====
- Cycas thouarsii
- Encephalartos bubalinus
- Encephalartos hildebrandtii
- Encephalartos kisambo
- Encephalartos tegulaneus
- Encephalartos tegulaneus subsp. powysii

==== Uganda ====
- Encephalartos equatorialis
- Encephalartos macrostrobilus
- Encephalartos septentrionalis
- Encephalartos whitelockii

==== South Sudan ====
- Encephalartos mackenziei
- Encephalartos septentrionalis

==== Madagascar ====
- Cycas thouarsii

==== Comoros ====
- Cycas thouarsii

==== Seychelles ====
- Cycas thouarsii

=== West Africa ===
Encephalartos barteri is the only cycad species recorded in West Africa.

==== Nigeria ====
- Encephalartos barteri
- Encephalartos barteri subsp. allochrous

==== Benin ====
- Encephalartos barteri

==== Togo ====
- ?Encephalartos barteri

==== Ghana ====
- Encephalartos barteri

== South Asia ==
Cycas pectinata has the most widespread distribution in South Asia, and is the only South Asian cycad species found outside India and Sri Lanka.

=== India ===
- Cycas andamanica
- Cycas annaikalensis
- Cycas beddomei
- Cycas circinalis
- Cycas indica
- Cycas nathorstii
- Cycas pectinata
- Cycas sphaerica
- Cycas zeylanica
- Cycas orixensis

=== Sri Lanka ===
- Cycas nathorstii
- Cycas zeylanica

=== Bangladesh ===
- Cycas pectinata

=== Bhutan ===
- Cycas pectinata

=== Nepal ===
- Cycas pectinata

== East Asia ==
=== Japan ===
- Cycas revoluta

=== China ===
- Cycas balansae
- Cycas bifida
- Cycas changjiangensis
- Cycas chenii
- Cycas debaoensis
- Cycas diannanensis
- Cycas dolichophylla
- Cycas ferruginea
- Cycas guizhouensis
- Cycas hainanensis
- Cycas hongheensis
- Cycas multipinnata
- Cycas panzhihuaensis
- Cycas pectinata
- Cycas revoluta
- Cycas segmentifida
- Cycas sexseminifera
- Cycas shanyaensis
- Cycas szechuanensis
- Cycas szechuanensis subsp. fairylakea
- Cycas taiwaniana
- Cycas tanqingii

=== Taiwan ===
- Cycas taitungensis

== Southeast Asia ==
=== Vietnam ===
- Cycas aculeata
- Cycas balansae
- Cycas bifida
- Cycas brachycantha
- Cycas chevalieri
- Cycas clivicola
- Cycas collina
- Cycas condaoensis
- Cycas diannanensis
- Cycas dolichophylla
- Cycas edentata
- Cycas elongata
- Cycas ferruginea
- Cycas fugax
- Cycas hoabinhensis
- Cycas inermis
- Cycas lindstromii
- Cycas micholitzii
- Cycas multipinnata
- Cycas pachypoda
- Cycas pectinata
- Cycas segmentifida
- Cycas sexseminifera
- Cycas siamensis
- Cycas simplicipinna
- ?Cycas tanqingii
- Cycas tropophylla

=== Laos ===
- ?Cycas micholitzii
- Cycas pectinata
- Cycas siamensis
- Cycas simplicipinna

=== Thailand ===
- Cycas chamaoensis
- Cycas clivicola
- Cycas edentata
- Cycas elephantipes
- Cycas macrocarpa
- Cycas nongnoochiae
- Cycas pectinata
- Cycas petraea
- Cycas pranburiensis
- Cycas siamensis
- Cycas simplicipinna
- Cycas tansachana

=== Cambodia ===
- Cycas clivicola
- Cycas siamensis

=== Myanmar ===
- Cycas edentata
- Cycas pectinata
- Cycas siamensis
- Cycas simplicipinna

=== Malaysia ===
- Cycas cantafolia
- Cycas clivicola
- Cycas edentata
- Cycas macrocarpa

=== Singapore ===
- Cycas edentata

=== Philippines ===
- Cycas aenigma
- Cycas curranii
- Cycas edentata
- Cycas lacrimans
- Cycas nitida
- Cycas riuminiana
- Cycas sancti-lasallei
- Cycas saxatilis
- Cycas vespertilio
- Cycas wadei
- Cycas zambalensis

=== Indonesia ===
- Cycas apoa
- Cycas edentata
- Cycas falcata
- Cycas glauca
- Cycas javana
- Cycas montana
- Cycas papuana
- Cycas rumphii
- Cycas scratchleyana
- Cycas sundaica

=== East Timor ===
- Cycas glauca

== Oceania ==
The eastern coast of Australia contains the most diversity. Cycas seemannii is found in Melanesia and western Polynesia. Cycas micronesica is found in Micronesia.

=== Australia ===
- Bowenia serrulata
- Bowenia spectabilis
- Cycas angulata
- Cycas arenicola
- Cycas armstrongii
- Cycas arnhemica
- Cycas arnhemica subsp. muninga
- Cycas arnhemica subsp. natja
- Cycas badensis
- Cycas basaltica
- Cycas brunnea
- Cycas cairnsiana
- Cycas calcicola
- Cycas canalis
- Cycas candida
- Cycas conferta
- Cycas couttsiana
- Cycas cupida
- Cycas desolata
- Cycas furfuracea
- Cycas lane-poolei
- Cycas maconochiei
- Cycas maconochiei subsp. lanata
- Cycas maconochiei subsp. viridis
- Cycas media
- Cycas media subsp. ensata
- Cycas media subsp. banksii
- Cycas megacarpa
- Cycas ophiolitica
- Cycas orientis
- Cycas platyphylla
- Cycas pruinosa
- Cycas rumphii
- Cycas seemannii
- Cycas semota
- Cycas silvestris
- Cycas tuckeri
- Cycas xipholepis
- Cycas yorkiana
- Lepidozamia hopei
- Lepidozamia peroffskyana
- Macrozamia cardiacensis
- Macrozamia communis
- Macrozamia concinna
- Macrozamia conferta
- Macrozamia cranei
- Macrozamia crassifolia
- Macrozamia diplomera
- Macrozamia douglasii
- Macrozamia dyeri
- Macrozamia elegans
- Macrozamia fawcettii
- Macrozamia fearnsidei
- Macrozamia flexuosa
- Macrozamia fraseri
- Macrozamia glaucophylla
- Macrozamia heteromera
- Macrozamia humilis
- Macrozamia johnsonii
- Macrozamia lomandroides
- Macrozamia longispina
- Macrozamia lucida
- Macrozamia macdonnellii
- Macrozamia machinii
- Macrozamia macleayi
- Macrozamia miquelii
- Macrozamia montana
- Macrozamia moorei
- Macrozamia mountperriensis
- Macrozamia occidua
- Macrozamia parcifolia
- Macrozamia pauli-guilielmi
- Macrozamia platyrhachis
- Macrozamia plurinervia
- Macrozamia polymorpha
- Macrozamia reducta
- Macrozamia riedlei
- Macrozamia secunda
- Macrozamia serpentina
- Macrozamia spiralis
- Macrozamia stenomera
- Macrozamia viridis

=== Papua New Guinea ===
- Cycas apoa
- Cycas bougainvilleana
- Cycas campestris
- Cycas papuana
- Cycas rumphii
- Cycas schumanniana
- Cycas scratchleyana

=== Solomon Islands ===
- Cycas bougainvilleana

=== New Caledonia ===
- Cycas seemannii

=== Vanuatu ===
- Cycas seemannii

=== Fiji ===
- Cycas seemannii

=== Tonga ===
- Cycas seemannii

=== Palau ===
- Cycas micronesica

=== Micronesia ===
- Cycas micronesica

=== Guam ===
- Cycas micronesica

=== Northern Mariana Islands ===
- Cycas micronesica

== North America and Caribbean ==
=== United States ===
- Zamia integrifolia

=== Bahamas ===
- Zamia angustifolia
- Zamia integrifolia
- Zamia lucayana

=== Cayman Islands ===
- Zamia integrifolia

=== Cuba ===
- Zamia angustifolia
- Zamia erosa
- Zamia integrifolia
- Zamia pumila
- Zamia pygmaea
- Zamia stricta
- Microcycas calocoma

=== Dominican Republic ===
- Zamia pumila

=== Puerto Rico ===
- Zamia erosa
- Zamia portoricensis
- Zamia pumila

=== Jamaica ===
- Zamia erosa

== Central America ==
=== Mexico ===
- Ceratozamia alvarezii
- Ceratozamia becerrae
- Ceratozamia brevifrons
- Ceratozamia chimalapensis
- Ceratozamia decumbens
- Ceratozamia euryphyllidia
- Ceratozamia fuscoviridis
- Ceratozamia hildae
- Ceratozamia huastecorum
- Ceratozamia kuesteriana
- Ceratozamia latifolia
- Ceratozamia matudae
- Ceratozamia mexicana
- Ceratozamia microstrobila
- Ceratozamia miqueliana
- Ceratozamia mirandae
- Ceratozamia mixeorum
- Ceratozamia morettii
- Ceratozamia norstogii
- Ceratozamia robusta
- Ceratozamia sabatoi
- Ceratozamia santillanii
- Ceratozamia vovidesii
- Ceratozamia whitelockiana
- Ceratozamia zaragozae
- Ceratozamia zoquorum
- Dioon angustifolium
- Dioon argenteum
- Dioon califanoi
- Dioon caputoi
- Dioon edule
- Dioon holmgrenii
- Dioon merolae
- Dioon purpusii
- Dioon rzedowskii
- Dioon sonorense
- Dioon spinulosum
- Dioon stevensonii
- Dioon tomasellii
- Zamia cremnophila
- Zamia fischeri
- Zamia furfuracea
- Zamia grijalvensis
- Zamia herrerae
- Zamia inermis
- Zamia katzeriana
- Zamia lacandona
- Zamia lawsoniana
- Zamia loddigesii
- Zamia magnifica''
- Zamia paucijuga
- Zamia prasina
- Zamia purpurea
- Zamia soconuscensis
- Zamia spartea
- Zamia spendens
- Zamia variegata
- Zamia vazquezii

=== Belize ===
- Ceratozamia robusta
- Zamia decumbens
- Zamia loddigesii
- Zamia meermanii
- Zamia prasina
- Zamia variegata

=== Guatemala ===
- Ceratozamia matudae
- Ceratozamia robusta
- Zamia herrerae
- Zamia monticola
- Zamia prasina
- Zamia standleyi
- Zamia tuerckheimii
- Zamia variegata

=== El Salvador ===
- Zamia herrerae
- Zamia loddigesii

=== Honduras ===
- Ceratozamia hondurensis
- Dioon mejiae
- Zamia herrerae
- Zamia loddigesii
- Zamia onan-reyesii
- Zamia oreillyi
- Zamia sandovalii
- Zamia standleyi

=== Nicaragua ===
- Zamia acuminata
- Zamia herrerae
- Zamia neurophyllidia

=== Costa Rica ===
- Zamia acuminata
- Zamia fairchildiana
- Zamia gomeziana
- Zamia neurophyllidia
- Zamia pseudomonticola

=== Panama ===
- Zamia acuminata
- Zamia cunaria
- Zamia dressleri
- Zamia elegantissima
- Zamia fairchildiana
- Zamia hamannii
- Zamia imperialis
- Zamia ipetiensis
- Zamia lindleyi
- Zamia manicata
- Zamia nana
- Zamia nesophila
- Zamia neurophyllidia
- Zamia obliqua
- Zamia pseudomonticola
- Zamia pseudoparasitica
- Zamia skinneri
- Zamia stevensonii

== South America ==
=== Colombia ===
- Zamia amazonum
- Zamia amplifolia
- Zamia chigua
- Zamia disodon
- Zamia encephalartoides
- Zamia huilensis
- Zamia hymenophyllidia
- Zamia imbricata
- Zamia incognita
- Zamia lecointei
- Zamia lindosensis
- Zamia manicata
- Zamia melanorrhachis
- Zamia montana
- Zamia muricata
- Zamia obliqua
- Zamia oligodonta
- Zamia orinoquiensis
- Zamia paucifoliolata
- Zamia pyrophylla
- Zamia restrepoi
- Zamia roezlii
- Zamia sinuensis
- Zamia tolimensis
- Zamia ulei
- Zamia wallisii

=== Ecuador ===
- Zamia amazonum
- Zamia gentryi
- Zamia lindenii
- Zamia roezlii
- Zamia ulei

=== Peru ===
- Zamia amazonum
- Zamia hymenophyllidia
- Zamia lecointei
- Zamia lindenii
- Zamia macrochiera
- Zamia ulei
- Zamia urep

=== Bolivia ===
- Zamia boliviana
- Zamia poeppigiana

=== Venezuela ===
- Zamia amazonum
- Zamia lecointei
- Zamia muricata
- Zamia ulei

=== Brazil ===
- Zamia amazonum
- Zamia boliviana
- Zamia brasiliensis
- Zamia lecointei
- Zamia multidentata
- Zamia poeppigiana
- Zamia ulei
