= Cycas dolichophylla =

Conservation status
- Near Threatened (IUCN 3.1)

Scientific classification
- Kingdom: Plantae
- Clade: Embryophytes
- Clade: Tracheophytes
- Clade: Gymnosperms
- Division: Cycadophyta
- Class: Cycadopsida
- Order: Cycadales
- Family: Cycadaceae
- Genus: Cycas
- Species: C. dolichophylla

Binomial name
- Cycas dolichophylla K.D.Hill, H.T.Nguyen & P.K.Lôc

Species of cycad

Cycas dolichophylla is a species of cycad in northern Vietnam and southern China.

== Range ==
Subpopulations include:

- West of Moc Chau (morphologically intermediate between Cycas dolichophylla and Cycas collina)
- Vo Nhai District and Yen Son District, Thai Nguyen Province (morphologically intermediate between Cycas dolichophylla and Cycas ferruginea)
- Villages west of Thai Nguyen (morphologically intermediate between Cycas dolichophylla and Cycas multifrondis)
- Gulinqing Township (古林箐乡), Maguan County and Malipo County, Yunnan, China
