= Zamia multidentata =

Scientific classification
- Kingdom: Plantae
- Clade: Tracheophytes
- Clade: Gymnospermae
- Division: Cycadophyta
- Class: Cycadopsida
- Order: Cycadales
- Family: Zamiaceae
- Genus: Zamia
- Species: Z. multidentata

Binomial name
- Zamia multidentata Segalla, Pimenta, & Calonje

Species of cycad

Zamia multidentata is a species of plant in the family Zamiaceae. It can be found in the Amazon Basin. Zamia multidentata is similar to Zamia hymenophyllidia and Zamia urep. It has 6.2 centimeter stems, 15 centimeter peduncles, and a flat megasporophylls.
