= Cycas chenii =

Scientific classification
- Kingdom: Plantae
- Clade: Tracheophytes
- Clade: Gymnospermae
- Division: Cycadophyta
- Class: Cycadopsida
- Order: Cycadales
- Family: Cycadaceae
- Genus: Cycas
- Species: C. chenii

Binomial name
- Cycas chenii Zhou, Guang & Xun, 2015

Species of cycad

Cycas chenii is a species of cycad endemic to the Red River valley of Yunnan, southern China. It is found in Honghe County and Shuangbai County, Yunnan. It is most closely related to Cycas guizhouensis.

== Distribution ==
Cycas chenii has been recorded in the following townships (Zhou, et al. 2015).

- Dutian (独田乡), Shuangbai County (type locality)
- Lianhua (莲花), Honghe County
- Menglong (勐龙河), Honghe County
- Qingshuihe (清水河), Shuangbai County
