= Cycas macrocarpa =

Conservation status
- Vulnerable (IUCN 3.1)

Scientific classification
- Kingdom: Plantae
- Clade: Tracheophytes
- Clade: Gymnospermae
- Division: Cycadophyta
- Class: Cycadopsida
- Order: Cycadales
- Family: Cycadaceae
- Genus: Cycas
- Species: C. macrocarpa

Binomial name
- Cycas macrocarpa Griff.

Species of cycad

Cycas macrocarpa is a species of cycad in Malaysia and Thailand.

It is found in the ridge forests of southern Thailand and in Prachuap Khiri Khan Province, as well as in northern and central peninsular Malaysia.
