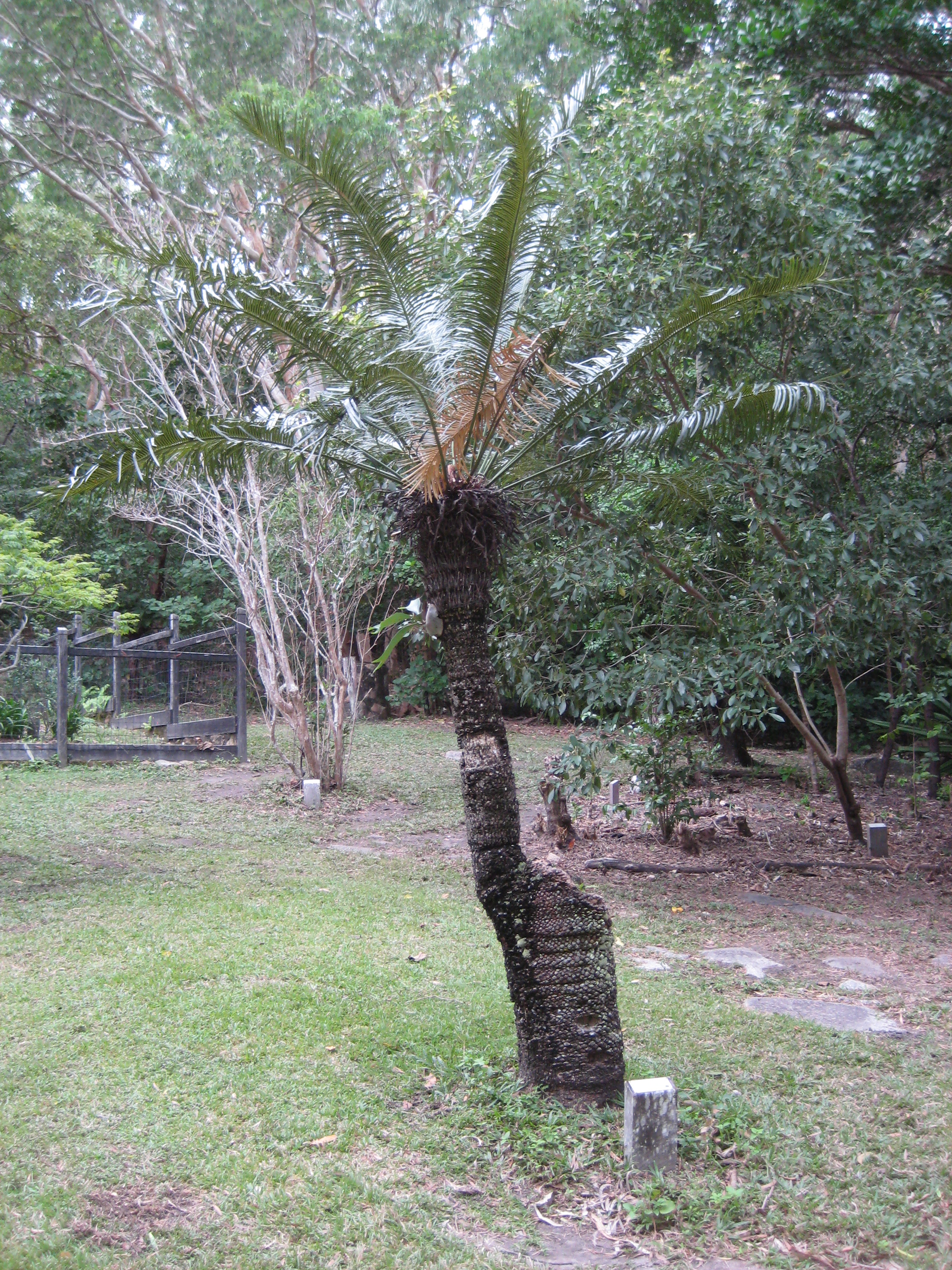

Conservation status
- Least Concern (IUCN 3.1)

Scientific classification
- Kingdom: Plantae
- Clade: Tracheophytes
- Clade: Gymnospermae
- Division: Cycadophyta
- Class: Cycadopsida
- Order: Cycadales
- Family: Cycadaceae
- Genus: Cycas
- Species: C. media

Binomial name
- Cycas media R.Br.
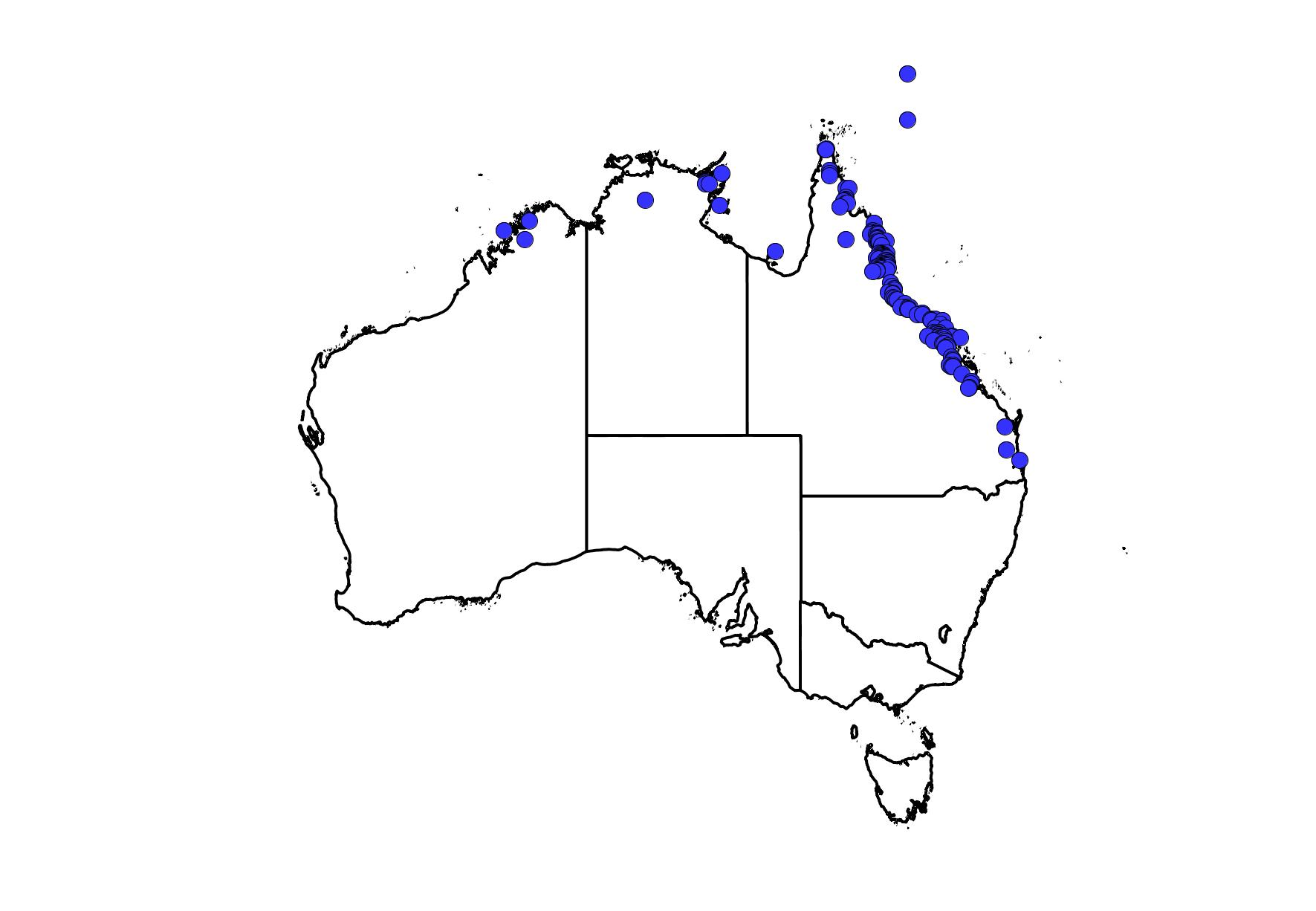
- Natural distribution of Cycas media

= Cycas media =

Species of cycad

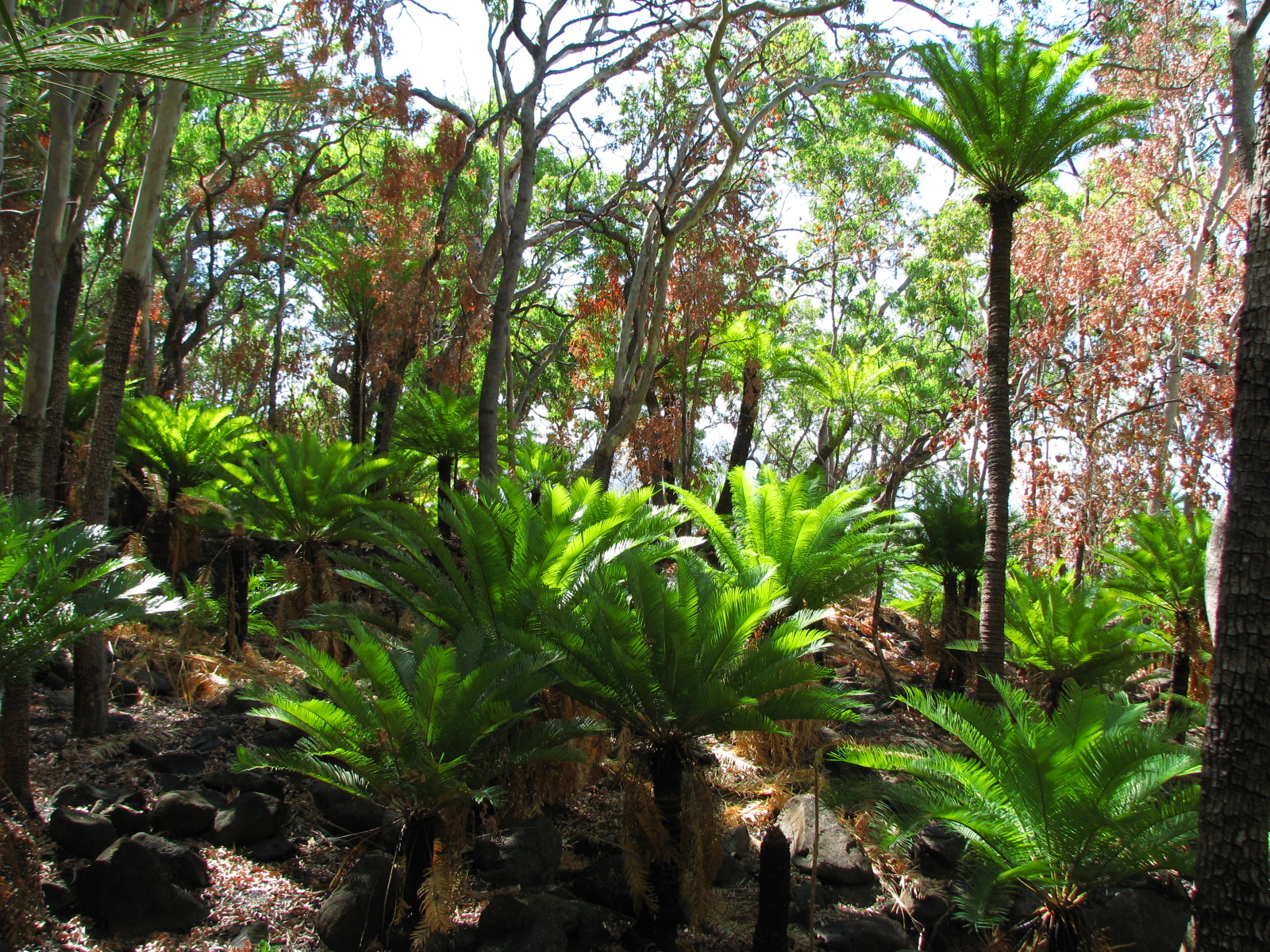
Grove of Cycas media in north-east Queensland, newly re-foliated during the dry season after a bushfire

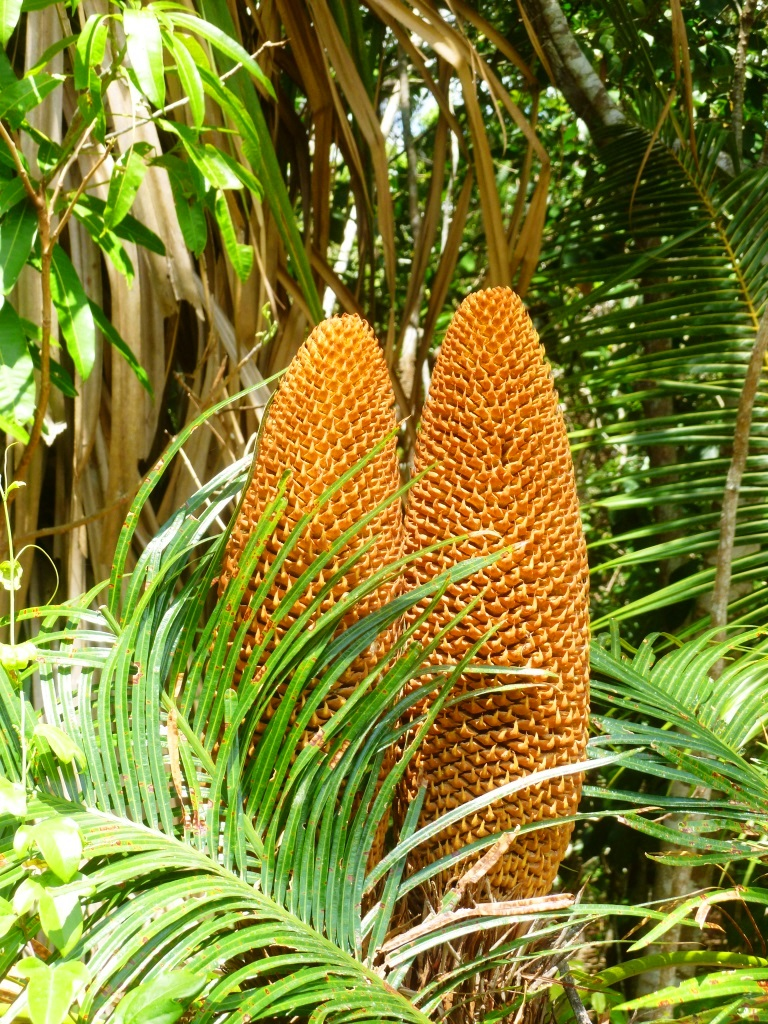
Twin cones of Cycas media near Cooktown, Queensland

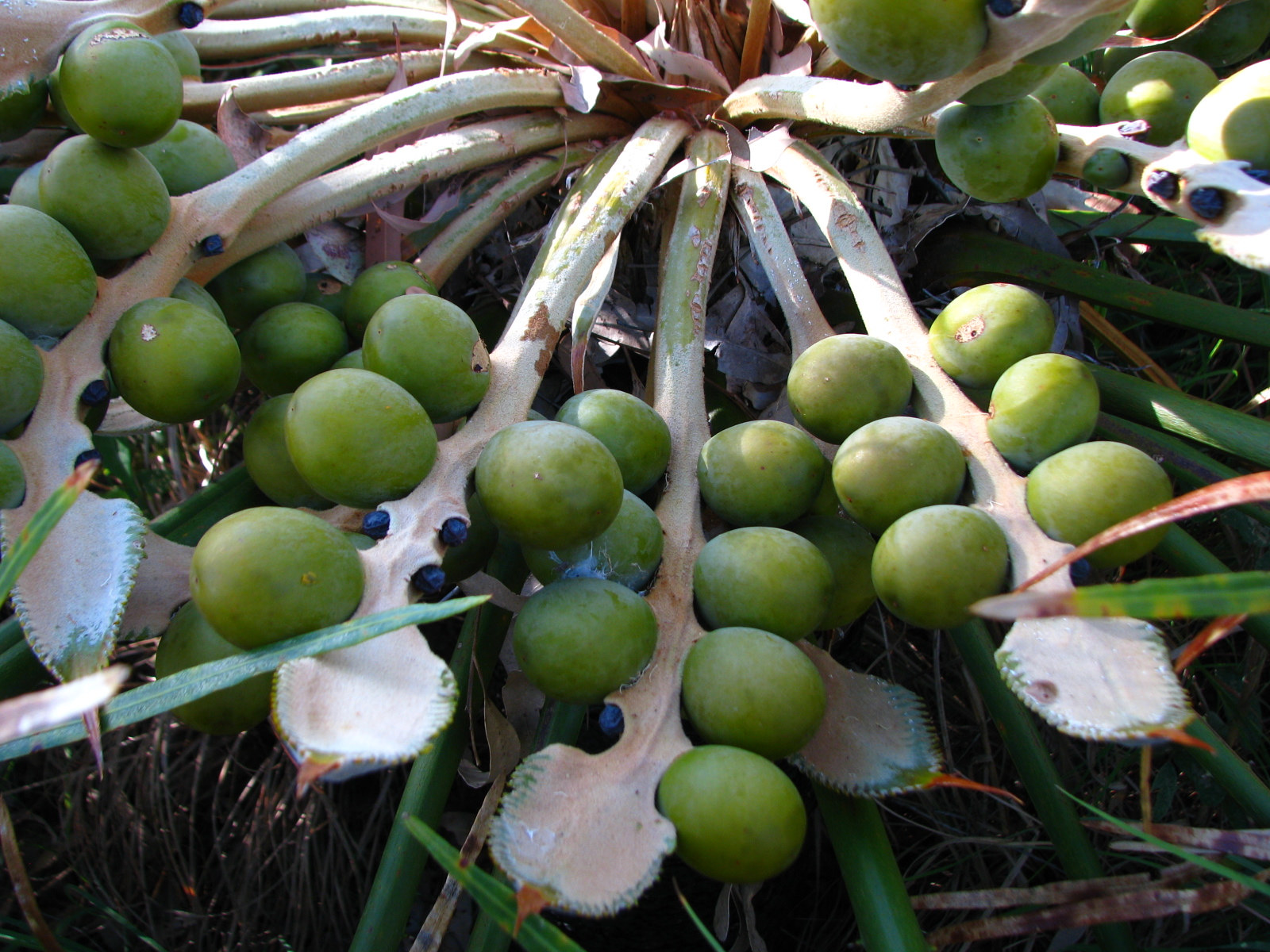
Cycas media megasporophylls with nearly-mature seeds on a wild plant in north Queensland, Australia

Cycas media is a palm-like cone-bearing plant widespread in seasonally dry tropical sclerophyll woodlands close to the east coast of Queensland, with scattered occurrences also in northern Northern Territory and Western Australia, Australia. The dark green leathery, thick leaves are pinnately divided and grow in annual flushes from a massive apical bud. It is tolerant of bushfire and often re-foliates immediately following a dry season fire, before the beginning of the next rainy season. All plant parts are considered highly toxic. However, the seeds were eaten by Aboriginal Australians after careful and extensive preparation to remove the toxins.

The 1889 book 'The Useful Native Plants of Australia records that common names included "Nut Palm" while Central Queensland Indigenous people referred to the plant as "Baveu" and that "An excellent farina is obtained from it. The nuts are deprived of their outer succulent cover (sarcocarp) and are then broken; and the kernels, having been roughly pounded, are dried three or four hours in the sun, then brought in a dilly-bag to a stream or pond, where they remain in the running water four or five days, and in stagnant water three or four days. By a touch of the fingers the proper degree of softness produced by maceration is ascertained. They are afterwards placed between the two stones mentioned under Colocasia macrorrhizon, reduced to a fine paste, and then baked under the ashes in the same way that our bush people bake their damper. (Thozet.)"
