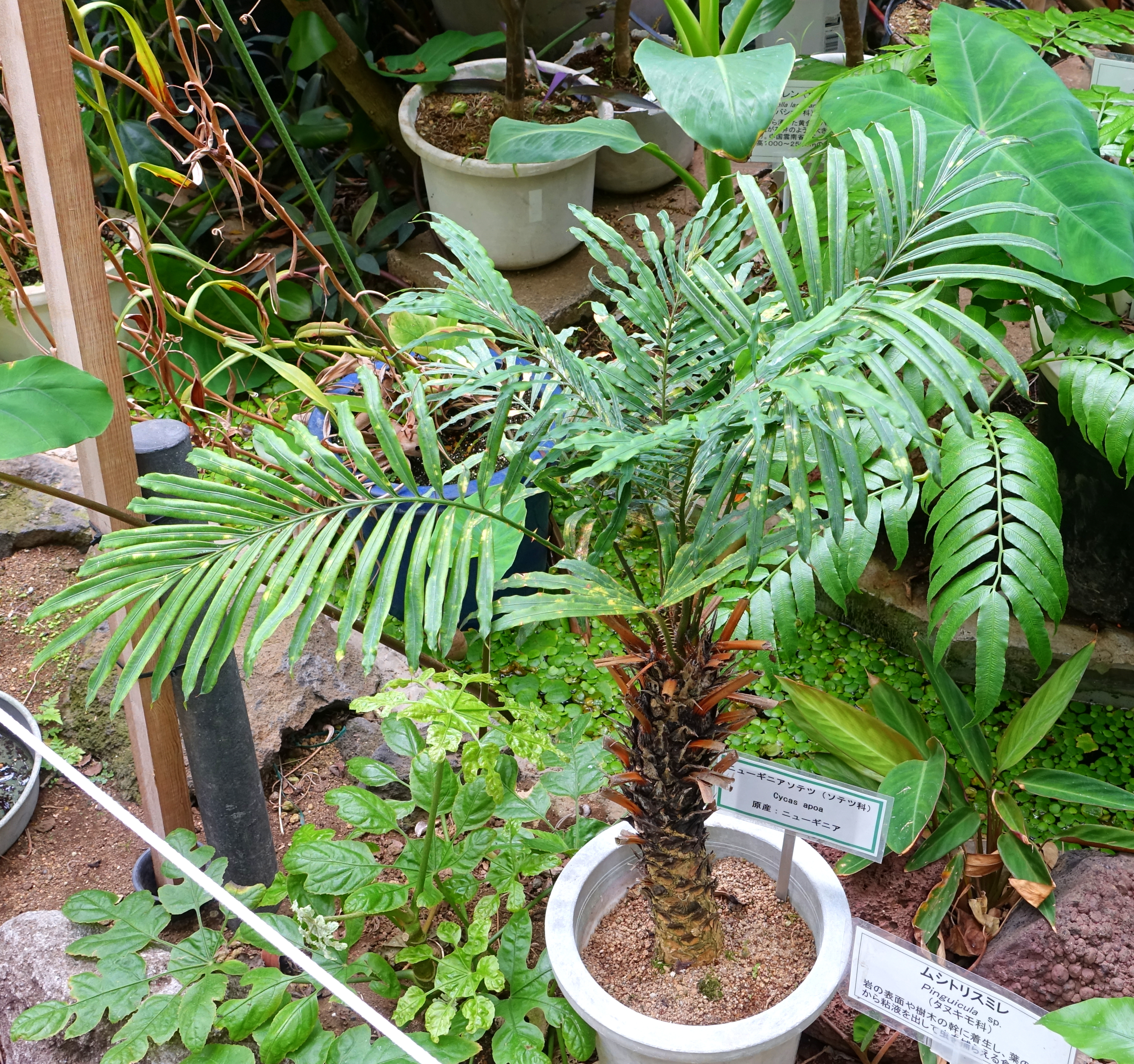

Conservation status
- Least Concern (IUCN 3.1)

Scientific classification
- Kingdom: Plantae
- Clade: Tracheophytes
- Clade: Gymnospermae
- Division: Cycadophyta
- Class: Cycadopsida
- Order: Cycadales
- Family: Cycadaceae
- Genus: Cycas
- Species: C. apoa

Binomial name
- Cycas apoa K.D.Hill

= Cycas apoa =

Species of cycad

Cycas apoa is a species of cycad in the genus Cycas, native to northern New Guinea and Halmahera Island. It occurs in the Sepik River basin, in wet lowland forest in modestly seasonally flooded areas.

It has erect stems up to 2.5 m tall. The leaves are hairy and orange at first, soon losing the hair and becoming glossy bright green, numerous and spreading, 1.8-2.5 m long. The petiole is armed with spines nearly over its entirety, with glabrous, glossy green leaflets angled forward about 70-80 degrees.

The female cones are open, grey with orange hairs, with each sporophyll containing 6-8 ovules. The male cones are orange, narrowly ovoid.

The name derives from the plant's vernacular name in the language of the Kaka tribe of the Sepik River estuary in New Guinea.

First described in 1994, the plants were previously thought to be a population of Cycas circinalis. It is closely related to Cycas rumphii, with which it shares much of its geographical range. This species is not presently considered threatened, with a large population, fast growth, and remote habitat.
