= Cycas clivicola =

Conservation status
- Least Concern (IUCN 3.1)

Scientific classification
- Kingdom: Plantae
- Clade: Tracheophytes
- Clade: Gymnospermae
- Division: Cycadophyta
- Class: Cycadopsida
- Order: Cycadales
- Family: Cycadaceae
- Genus: Cycas
- Species: C. clivicola

Binomial name
- Cycas clivicola K.D.Hill

Species of cycad

Cycas clivicola is a species of cycad in Thailand, Cambodia, Vietnam, and Malaysia (including Perlis State Park). It is found on limestone outcrops, as well as on offshore islands.
