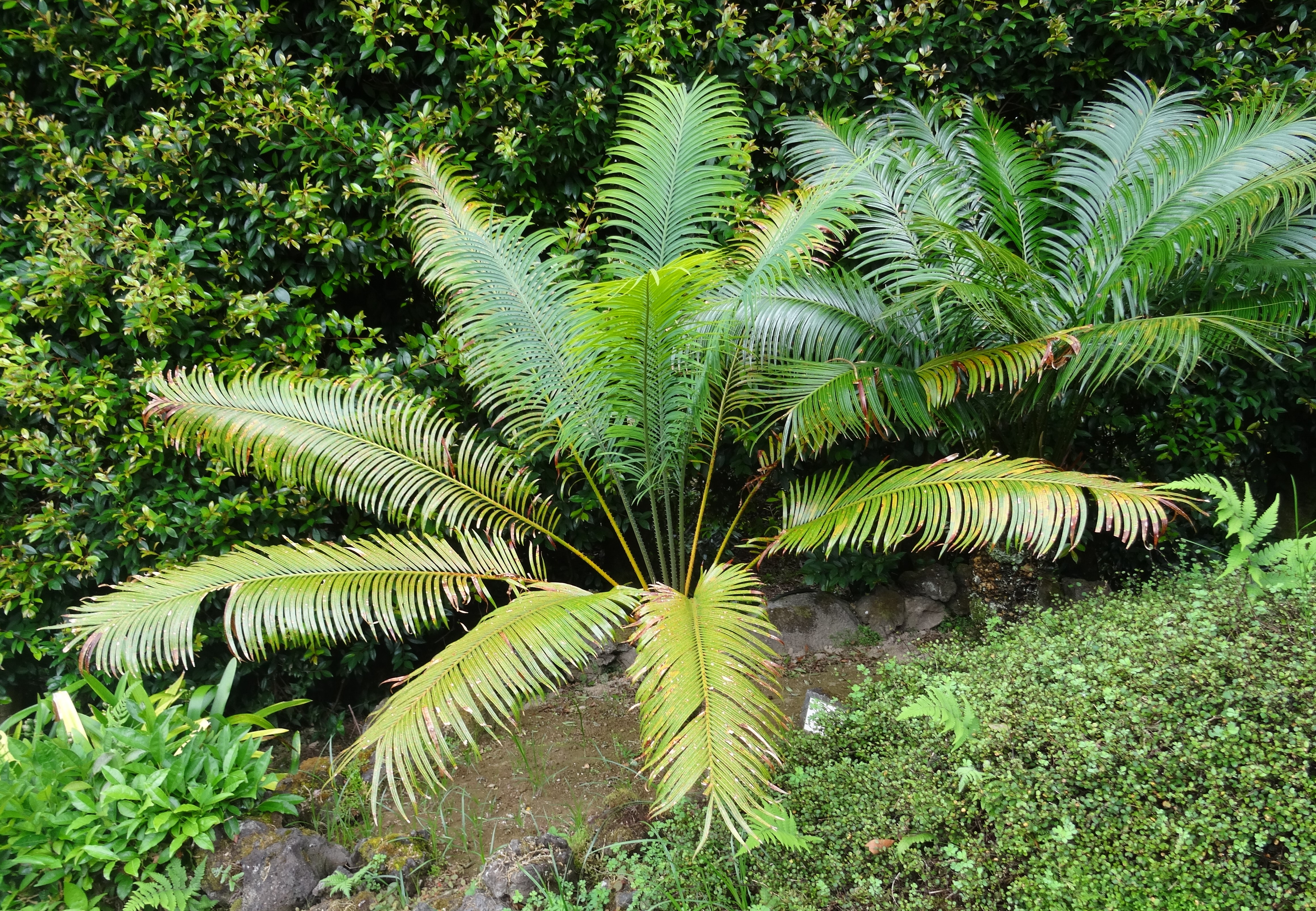

Conservation status
- Near Threatened (IUCN 3.1)

Scientific classification
- Kingdom: Plantae
- Clade: Tracheophytes
- Clade: Gymnospermae
- Division: Cycadophyta
- Class: Cycadopsida
- Order: Cycadales
- Family: Cycadaceae
- Genus: Cycas
- Species: C. bougainvilleana

Binomial name
- Cycas bougainvilleana K.D.Hill

= Cycas bougainvilleana =

Species of cycad

Cycas bougainvilleana is a species of cycad in the genus Cycas, native to the islands northeast of Papua New Guinea, on New Britain, the Bismarck Archipelago and the Solomon Islands, where it occurs on or near the coast in calcareous coral sand dunes and in adjacent forests.

The stems are erect, up to 5 m tall, with a crown of numerous leaves. The leaves are 2.4-2.7 m long, pinnate, with 130-260 leaflets; they are densely white to orange tomentose at first, eventually glabrous, glossy bright green. The leaflets are 25–34 cm long and 13–18 mm wide, and angled forward at 60-80° degrees. The petiole is sometimes armed with spines, and terminates in a spine or pair of leaflets.

The female cones are open, with sporophylls 7 cm long and 3.5–5 cm wide, and dense grey to orange tomentose, with 6-9 ovules per sporophyll. The sarcotesta is thick orange tomentose, and the sclerotesta flattened ovoid shaped. The male cones erect, narrow ovoid, with a broad apical spine.

It is named after its home on the Bougainville Island in the Bismarck Archipelago. It is not considered threatened. It is closely related to Cycas seemannii from Fiji.
