= Cycas tanqingii =

Conservation status
- Near Threatened (IUCN 3.1)

Scientific classification
- Kingdom: Plantae
- Clade: Tracheophytes
- Clade: Gymnospermae
- Division: Cycadophyta
- Class: Cycadopsida
- Order: Cycadales
- Family: Cycadaceae
- Genus: Cycas
- Species: C. tanqingii

Binomial name
- Cycas tanqingii D.Y.Wang

Species of cycad

Cycas tanqingii is a species of cycad in China and Vietnam. It is found in Luchun County, southern Yunnan Province, China, and in Lai Châu Province, Vietnam. In China, it is located in the Xiaoheidiang River and Heishui River watersheds. In Luchun County, it is protected in Huanglian Mountain National Nature Reserve. It is also cultivated at the Shenzhen Fairy Lake Botanical Garden and at the Forestry Bureau of Luchun County.

Its populations are relatively healthy due to early conservation and long-term monitoring.
