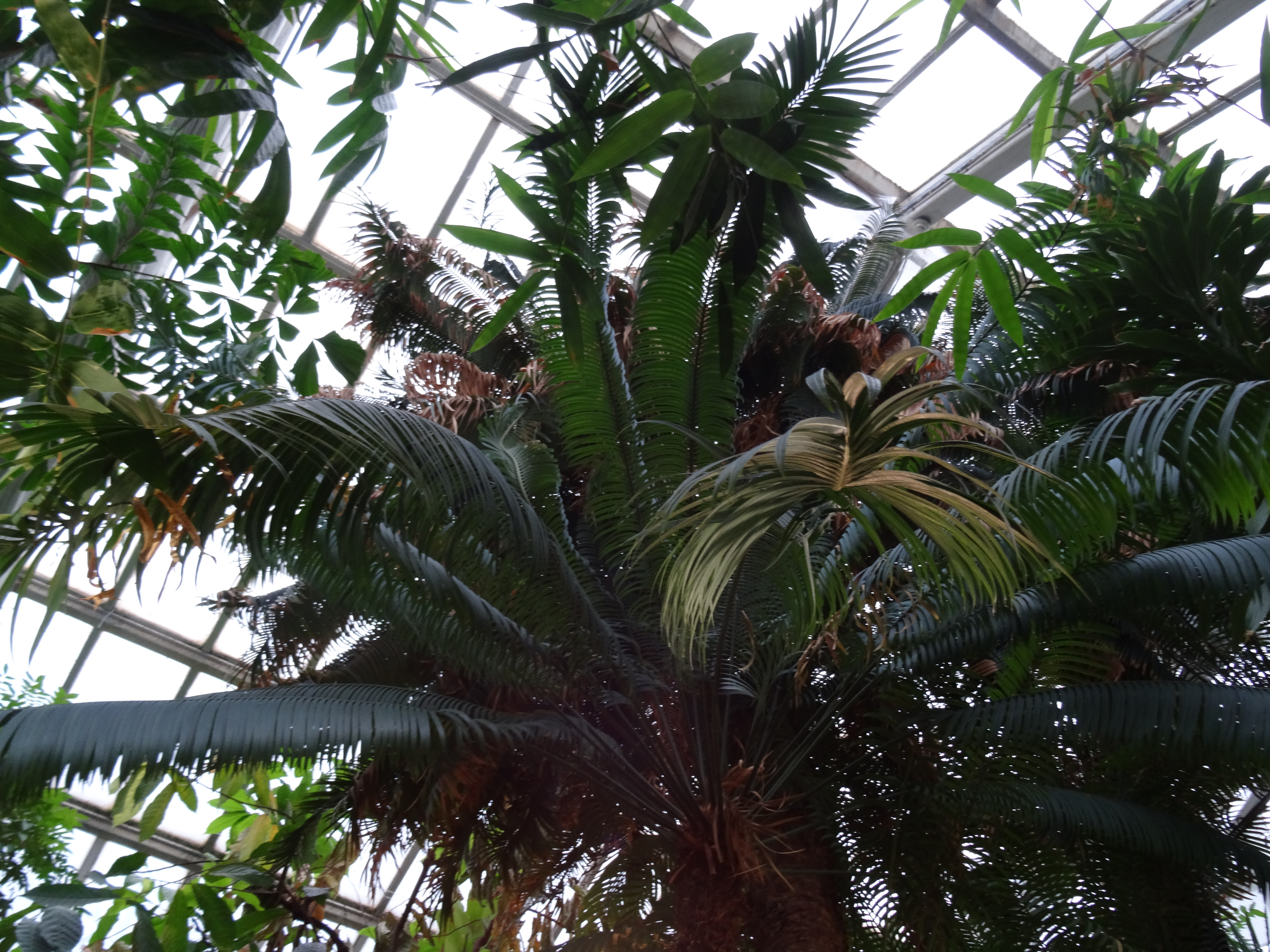
- In Lund Botanical Gardens

Conservation status
- Critically Endangered (IUCN 3.1)

Scientific classification
- Kingdom: Plantae
- Clade: Embryophytes
- Clade: Tracheophytes
- Clade: Gymnosperms
- Division: Cycadophyta
- Class: Cycadopsida
- Order: Cycadales
- Family: Cycadaceae
- Genus: Cycas
- Species: C. zeylanica

Binomial name
- Cycas zeylanica (J.Schust.) A.Lindstr. & K.D.Hill

Synonyms
- Cycas rumphii subsp. zeylanica J.Schust.

= Cycas zeylanica =

Species of cycad

Cycas zeylanica, common name (in Sri Lanka) maha-madu is a plant apparently at present endemic to the Andaman and Nicobar Islands. It was formerly also present in Sri Lanka, but a majority of the population there were destroyed by the tsunami of December 2004. A few trees are cited in Hanguranketha town Adikarigama area.

Cycas zeylanica is an unbranched shrub up to 3 m (9.8 ft) tall. Leaves are up to 200 cm (79 in) long, green, glossy, pinnately compound with up to 100 leaflets. Pollen-producing cones fusiform (tapering at both ends), microsporophylls (male, pollen-producing) up to 45 mm (1.8 in) long. Megasporophylls (female, ovule-producing) up to 30 cm (12 in) long, each with 2-5 ovules. Seeds flattened to ovoid, orange-brown.
