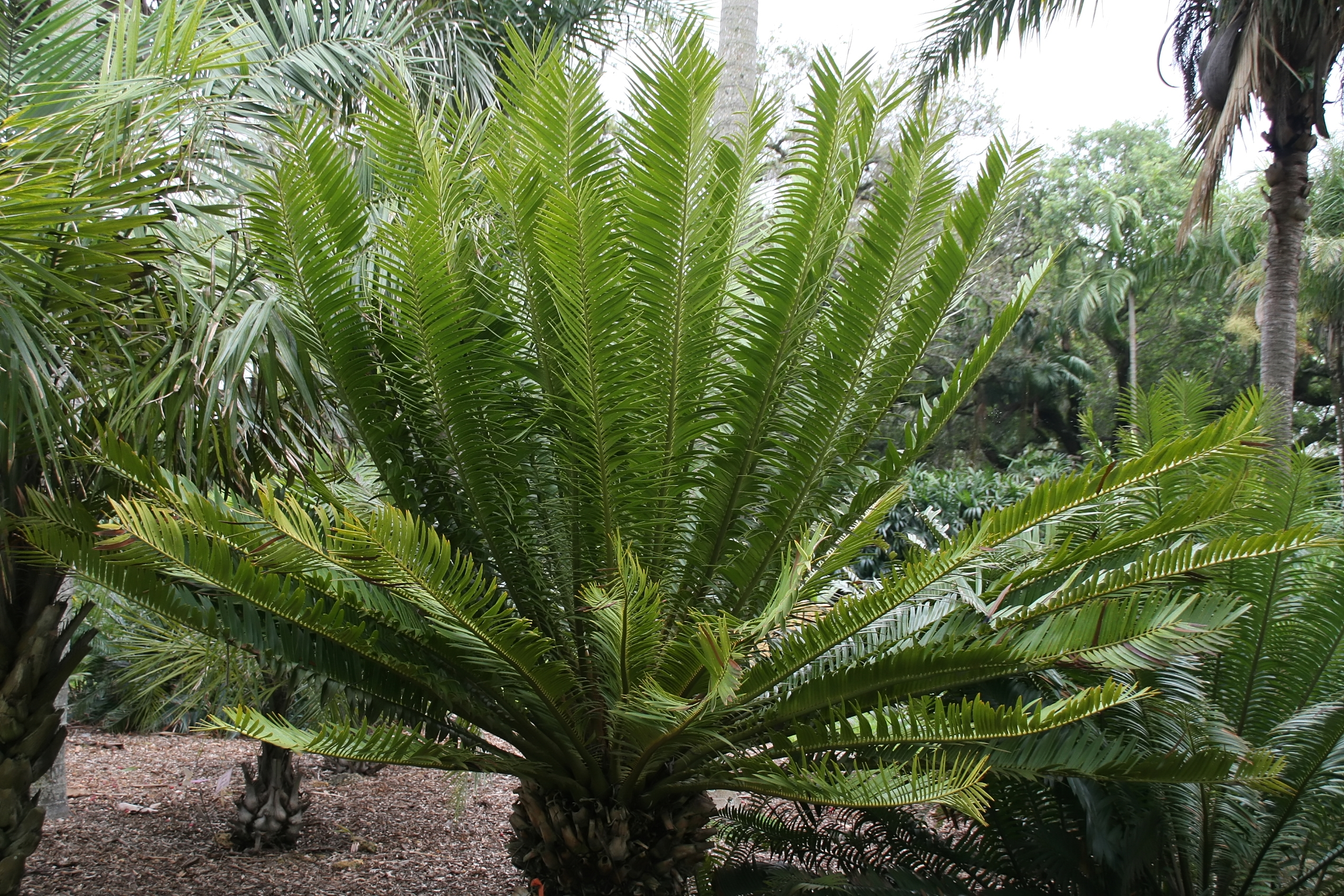

Conservation status
- Least Concern (IUCN 3.1)
- CITES Appendix I

Scientific classification
- Kingdom: Plantae
- Clade: Tracheophytes
- Clade: Gymnospermae
- Division: Cycadophyta
- Class: Cycadopsida
- Order: Cycadales
- Family: Zamiaceae
- Genus: Encephalartos
- Species: E. tegulaneus

Binomial name
- Encephalartos tegulaneus Melville

= Encephalartos tegulaneus =

Species of cycad

Encephalartos tegulaneus, the Kenyan giant cycad, is a species of cycad endemic to Kenya. It occurs in Eastern Province near Embu, Kenya, and on the Matthews Range in Rift Valley Province, where it grows between 1,200–2,300 metres altitude. It was discovered in May 1954 by Joy Adamson, author of "Born Free".

== Description ==
This cycad has a tree-like growth pattern, with a tall, straight stem reaching up to 10 metres in height and 30–55 centimetres diameter. Its leaves are 120–180 centimetres long, form a crown at the top of the stem, supported by a 15-20 centimetre long petiole. These leaves consist of many pairs of lance-shaped leaflets, each about 16–22 centimetres long, which become spiny towards the base of the petiole.

This species is dioecious, with separate male and female plants. Male plants produce 3-6 cylindrical cones, 40–50 centimetres long and 12–14 centimetres wide, which are bright yellow. Female plants produce one to four oval cones, 40–70 centimetres long and 19–30 centimetres wide, also golden yellow in colour. The species name tegulaneus refers to the pollen cone scales, which overlap like the tiles on a roof.

== Taxonomy ==
There are two subspecies:

- E. tegulaneus subsp. tegulaneus – least concern.
- E. tegulaneus subsp. powysii Miringu & Beentje – critically endangered due to overcollecting and a very limited distribution.
