= Cycas glauca =

Conservation status
- Data Deficient (IUCN 3.1)

Scientific classification
- Kingdom: Plantae
- Clade: Tracheophytes
- Clade: Gymnospermae
- Division: Cycadophyta
- Class: Cycadopsida
- Order: Cycadales
- Family: Cycadaceae
- Genus: Cycas
- Species: C. glauca

Binomial name
- Cycas glauca Miq.

Species of cycad

Cycas glauca is a species of cycad endemic to the Lesser Sunda Islands of Indonesia. It occurs on Timor and Sumba islands.
