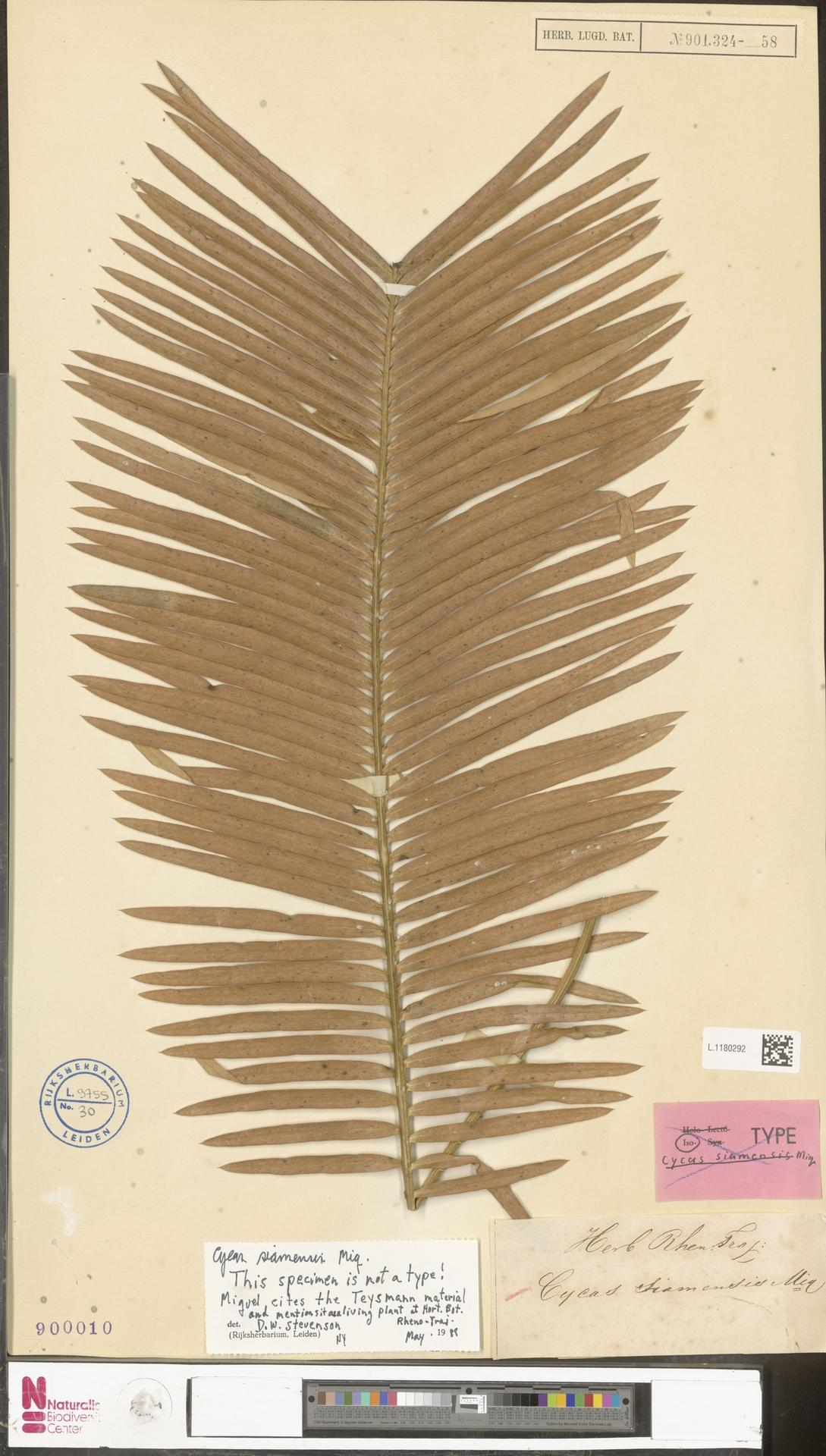

Conservation status
- Vulnerable (IUCN 3.1)

Scientific classification
- Kingdom: Plantae
- Clade: Tracheophytes
- Clade: Gymnospermae
- Division: Cycadophyta
- Class: Cycadopsida
- Order: Cycadales
- Family: Cycadaceae
- Genus: Cycas
- Species: C. siamensis

Binomial name
- Cycas siamensis Miq.

Synonyms
- Cycas aurea hort.; Cycas aurea hort. ex J.Schust.; Cycas boddamii Van Geert; Cycas immersa Craib; Cycas intermedia B.S.Williams; Cycas intermedia B.S.Williams ex T.Moore & Mast.; Cycas siamensis subsp. siamensis; Epicycas siamensis (Miq.) de Laub.

= Cycas siamensis =

Species of cycad

Cycas siamensis is a species of cycad native to Myanmar, Thailand, and Vietnam.
