= Zamia ulei =

Conservation status
- Near Threatened (IUCN 3.1)

Scientific classification
- Kingdom: Plantae
- Clade: Tracheophytes
- Clade: Gymnospermae
- Division: Cycadophyta
- Class: Cycadopsida
- Order: Cycadales
- Family: Zamiaceae
- Genus: Zamia
- Species: Z. ulei

Binomial name
- Zamia ulei Dammer

Synonyms
- Zamia cupatiensis Ducke; Zamia hispida Verschaff.

Species of cycad

Zamia ulei is a species of plant in the family Zamiaceae. It is found in Brazil, Colombia, Ecuador, and Peru.
