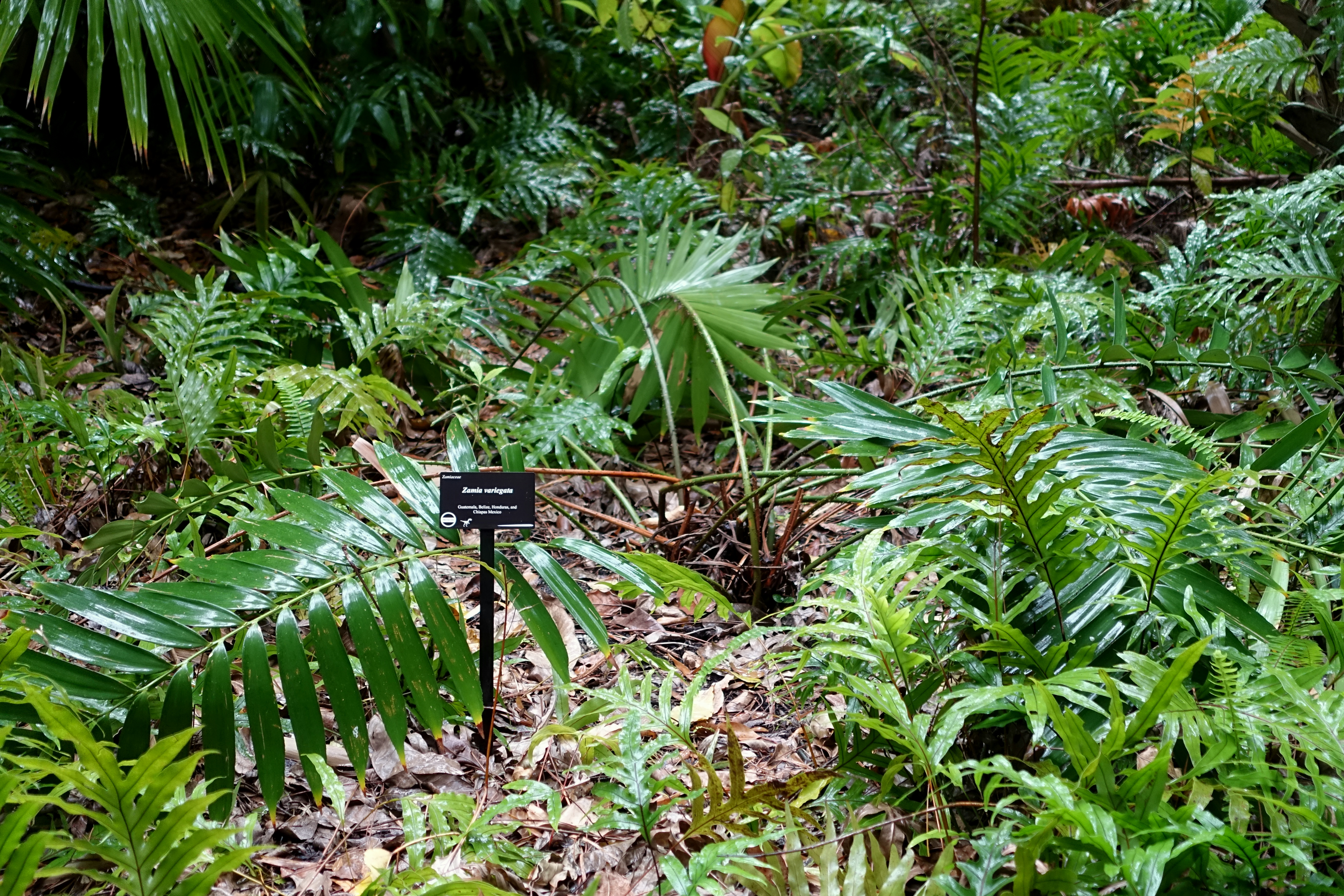

Conservation status
- Endangered (IUCN 3.1)

Scientific classification
- Kingdom: Plantae
- Clade: Tracheophytes
- Clade: Gymnospermae
- Division: Cycadophyta
- Class: Cycadopsida
- Order: Cycadales
- Family: Zamiaceae
- Genus: Zamia
- Species: Z. variegata

Binomial name
- Zamia variegata Warsz.

Synonyms
- Zamia picta Dyer

= Zamia variegata =

Species of cycad

Zamia variegata is a species of plant in the family Zamiaceae. It is native to Belize, Guatemala, Honduras, and Mexico. It grows in forests. It is threatened by habitat destruction, which has likely reduced the population by about 50% over the last few decades.

== Sources ==
- Nicolalde-Morejón, Fernando; Vovides, Andrew P.; Stevenson, Dennis W. (9 December 2009). "Taxonomic revision of Zamia in Mega-Mexico". Brittonia. 61 (4): 301–335. doi:10.1007/s12228-009-9077-9. ISSN 0007-196X.
