= Zamia herrerae =

Conservation status
- Vulnerable (IUCN 3.1)

Scientific classification
- Kingdom: Plantae
- Clade: Embryophytes
- Clade: Tracheophytes
- Clade: Spermatophytes
- Clade: Gymnospermae
- Division: Cycadophyta
- Class: Cycadopsida
- Order: Cycadales
- Family: Zamiaceae
- Genus: Zamia
- Species: Z. herrerae

Binomial name
- Zamia herrerae S.Calderon & Standl.

Species of plant

Zamia herrerae is a species of plant in the family Zamiaceae. It is found in El Salvador, Guatemala, Honduras, and Mexico. It is threatened by habitat loss.

== Sources ==
- Nicolalde-Morejón, Fernando; Vovides, Andrew P.; Stevenson, Dennis W. (9 December 2009). "Taxonomic revision of Zamia in Mega-Mexico". Brittonia. 61 (4): 301–335. doi:10.1007/s12228-009-9077-9. ISSN 0007-196X.
