= Cycas simplicipinna =

Conservation status
- Near Threatened (IUCN 3.1)

Scientific classification
- Kingdom: Plantae
- Clade: Tracheophytes
- Clade: Gymnospermae
- Division: Cycadophyta
- Class: Cycadopsida
- Order: Cycadales
- Family: Cycadaceae
- Genus: Cycas
- Species: C. simplicipinna

Binomial name
- Cycas simplicipinna (Smitinand) K.D.Hill

Species of cycad

Cycas simplicipinna is a species of cycad in Vietnam, Thailand, Laos, Myanmar, and China (in Yunnan). In Thailand, it has been recorded in the provinces of Chiang Mai (type locality), Phrae, Loei, and Phetchabun.
