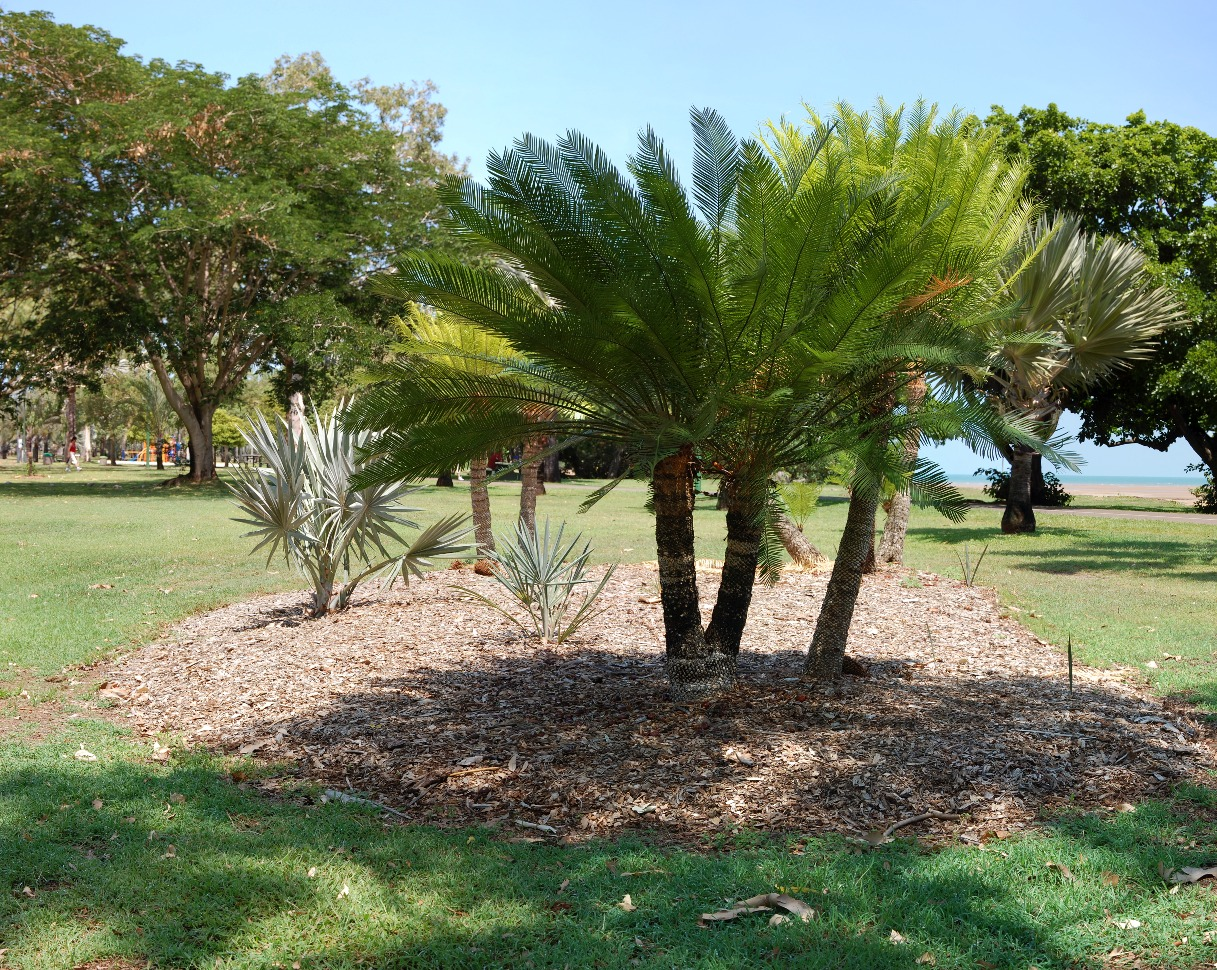

Conservation status
- Least Concern (IUCN 3.1)

Scientific classification
- Kingdom: Plantae
- Clade: Tracheophytes
- Clade: Gymnospermae
- Division: Cycadophyta
- Class: Cycadopsida
- Order: Cycadales
- Family: Cycadaceae
- Genus: Cycas
- Species: C. maconochiei

Binomial name
- Cycas maconochiei Chirgwin & K.D.Hill

= Cycas maconochiei =

Species of cycad

Cycas maconochiei is a species of cycad, endemic to Australia's Northern Territory. This species has three subspecies C. maconochiei ssp. maconochiei, C. maconochieissp. lanata and C. maconochiei ssp. viridis.
