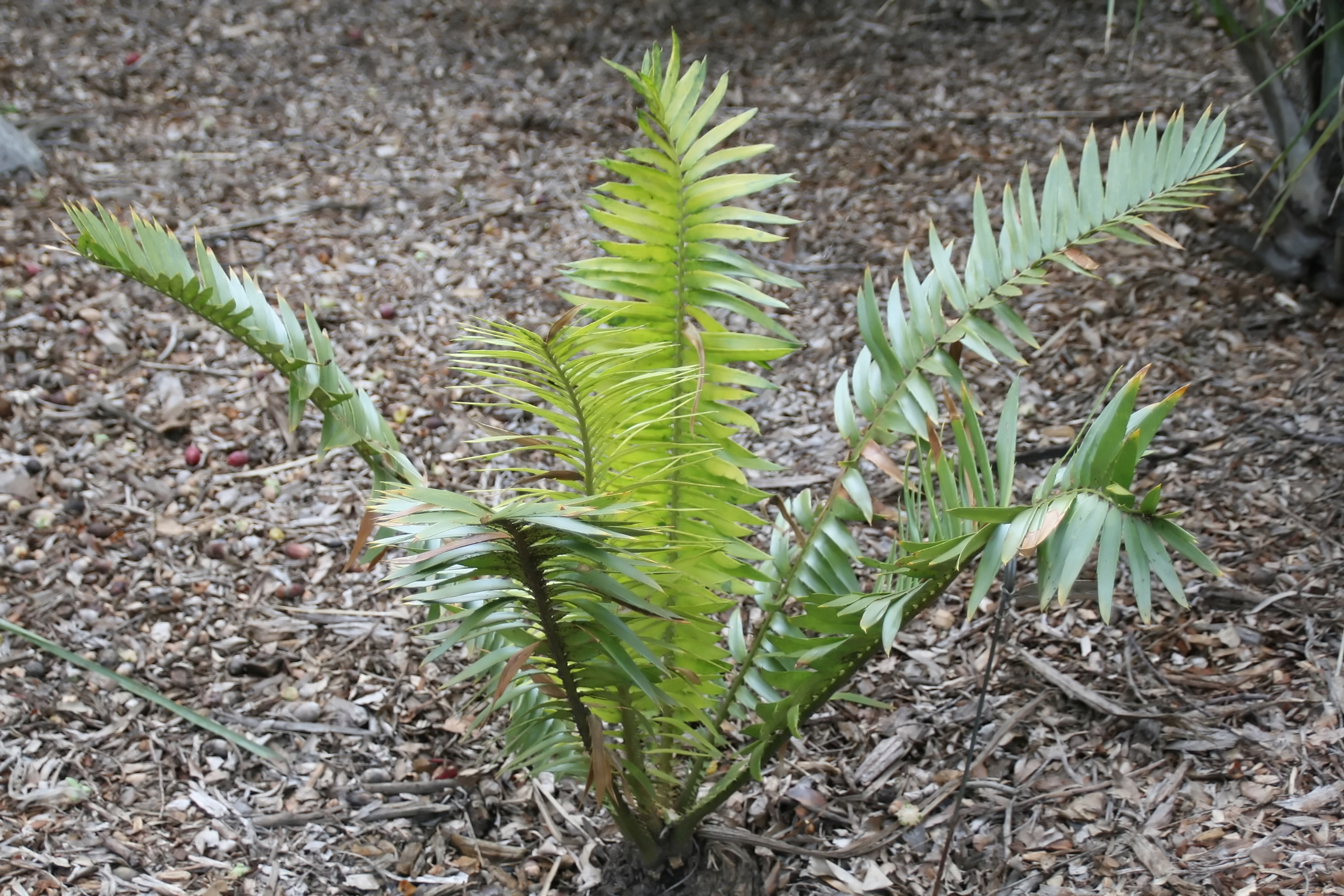

Conservation status
- Near Threatened (IUCN 3.1)
- CITES Appendix I (CITES)

Scientific classification
- Kingdom: Plantae
- Clade: Tracheophytes
- Clade: Gymnospermae
- Division: Cycadophyta
- Class: Cycadopsida
- Order: Cycadales
- Family: Zamiaceae
- Genus: Encephalartos
- Species: E. septentrionalis

Binomial name
- Encephalartos septentrionalis Schweinf. ex Eichler

= Encephalartos septentrionalis =

Species of cycad

Encephalartos septentrionalis, the Nile cycad, is a species of cycad in South Sudan, northern Uganda, northern Democratic Republic of the Congo (in the Okapi Faunal Reserve), and the interior of the Central African Republic.

== Description ==
This is a type of cycad characterized by a round stem, which is partially underground, reaching up to 2 meters in height and 25–30 centimeters in diameter.

Its leaves are feather-like (pinnate), measuring 90–150 centimeters long, and form a crown at the top of the stem. Each leaf is supported by a 2.5–5 centimeter long petiole and contains 40–50 pairs of lance-shaped leaflets with smooth edges. The leaves are a greyish-green color.

This species is dioecious, meaning it has separate male and female specimens. Male plants produce up to 8–10 ellipsoid cones, each 12–20 centimeters long and 6–8 centimeters wide, which are supported by stalks. Female plants produce solitary cylindrical cones that hang down, measuring 23–35 centimeters long and 18–20 centimeters in diameter when ripe, and have a yellowish-brown color.

The seeds are roughly oval-shaped and covered by a reddish sarcotesta.
