= Cycas scratchleyana =

Conservation status
- Least Concern (IUCN 3.1)

Scientific classification
- Kingdom: Plantae
- Clade: Embryophytes
- Clade: Tracheophytes
- Clade: Spermatophytes
- Clade: Gymnospermae
- Division: Cycadophyta
- Class: Cycadopsida
- Order: Cycadales
- Family: Cycadaceae
- Genus: Cycas
- Species: C. scratchleyana

Binomial name
- Cycas scratchleyana F.Muell.

Species of cycad

Cycas scratchleyana is a species of cycad native to New Guinea and Queensland. Australia. In New Guinea, it is widespread in the eastern part of the island.
