= Cycas nathorstii =

Conservation status
- Vulnerable (IUCN 3.1)

Scientific classification
- Kingdom: Plantae
- Clade: Tracheophytes
- Clade: Gymnospermae
- Division: Cycadophyta
- Class: Cycadopsida
- Order: Cycadales
- Family: Cycadaceae
- Genus: Cycas
- Species: C. nathorstii

Binomial name
- Cycas nathorstii J.Schust.

Species of cycad

Cycas nathorstii is a species of cycad native to Sri Lanka and Tamil Nadu, India.
