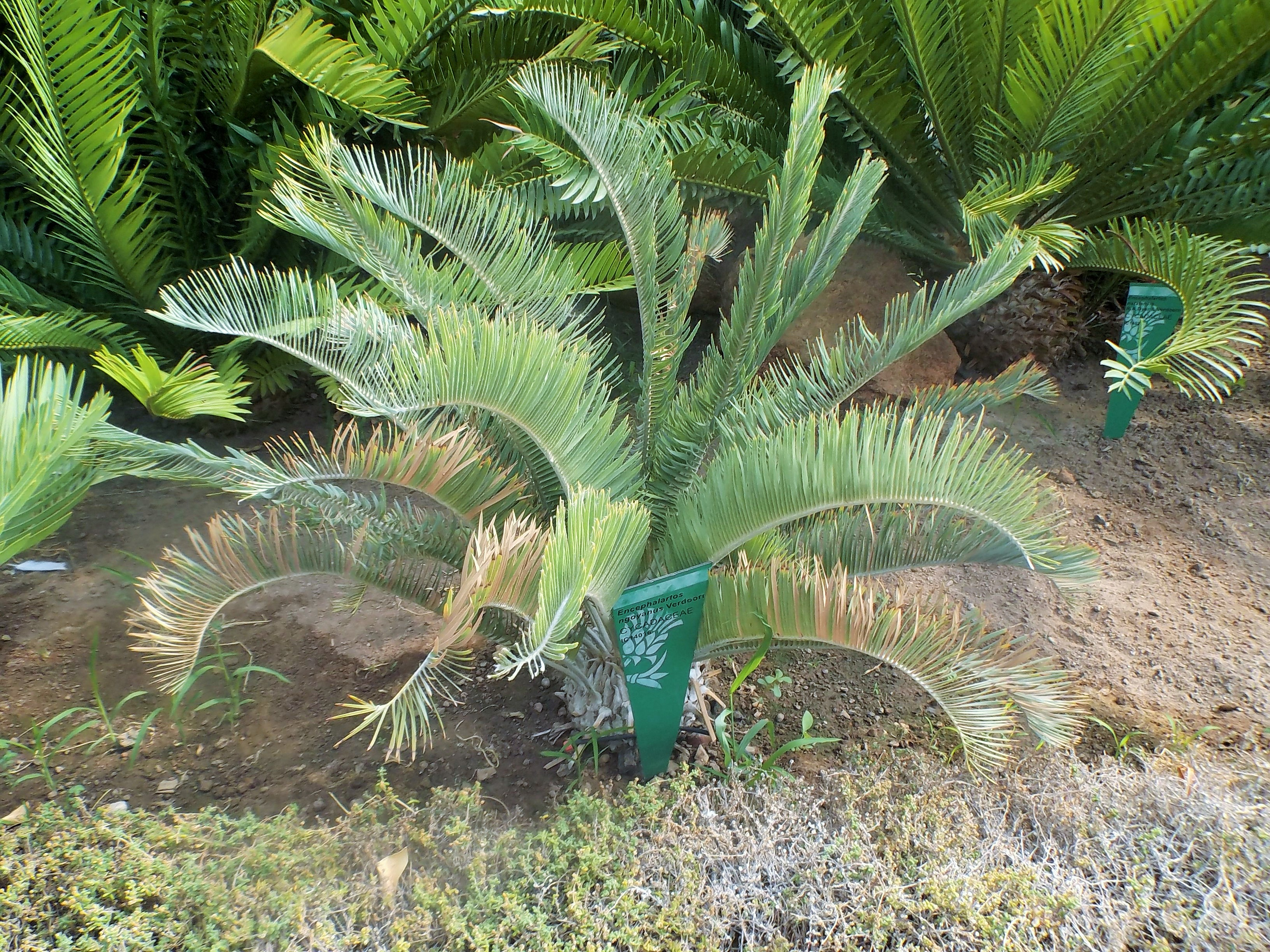

Conservation status
- Vulnerable (IUCN 3.1)
- CITES Appendix I (CITES)

Scientific classification
- Kingdom: Plantae
- Clade: Tracheophytes
- Clade: Gymnospermae
- Division: Cycadophyta
- Class: Cycadopsida
- Order: Cycadales
- Family: Zamiaceae
- Genus: Encephalartos
- Species: E. ngoyanus

Binomial name
- Encephalartos ngoyanus I.Verd.

= Encephalartos ngoyanus =

Species of cycad

Encephalartos ngoyanus is a species of cycad in Ngoye Forest, in KwaZulu-Natal, South Africa.

== Description ==
The plant grows to about 30 cm tall with a diameter of 15–20 cm. Its dark green leaves are 50–150 cm long and have leaflets that angle 180° from the rachis, tapering to thorns near the base. This species is dioecious, with yellow male cones measuring 20–25 cm long and 5–7 cm in diameter, and yellow female cones measuring 25 cm long and 12–15 cm in diameter. The seeds are oblong, 25–30 mm long and 15–20 mm wide, with a red sarcotesta.
