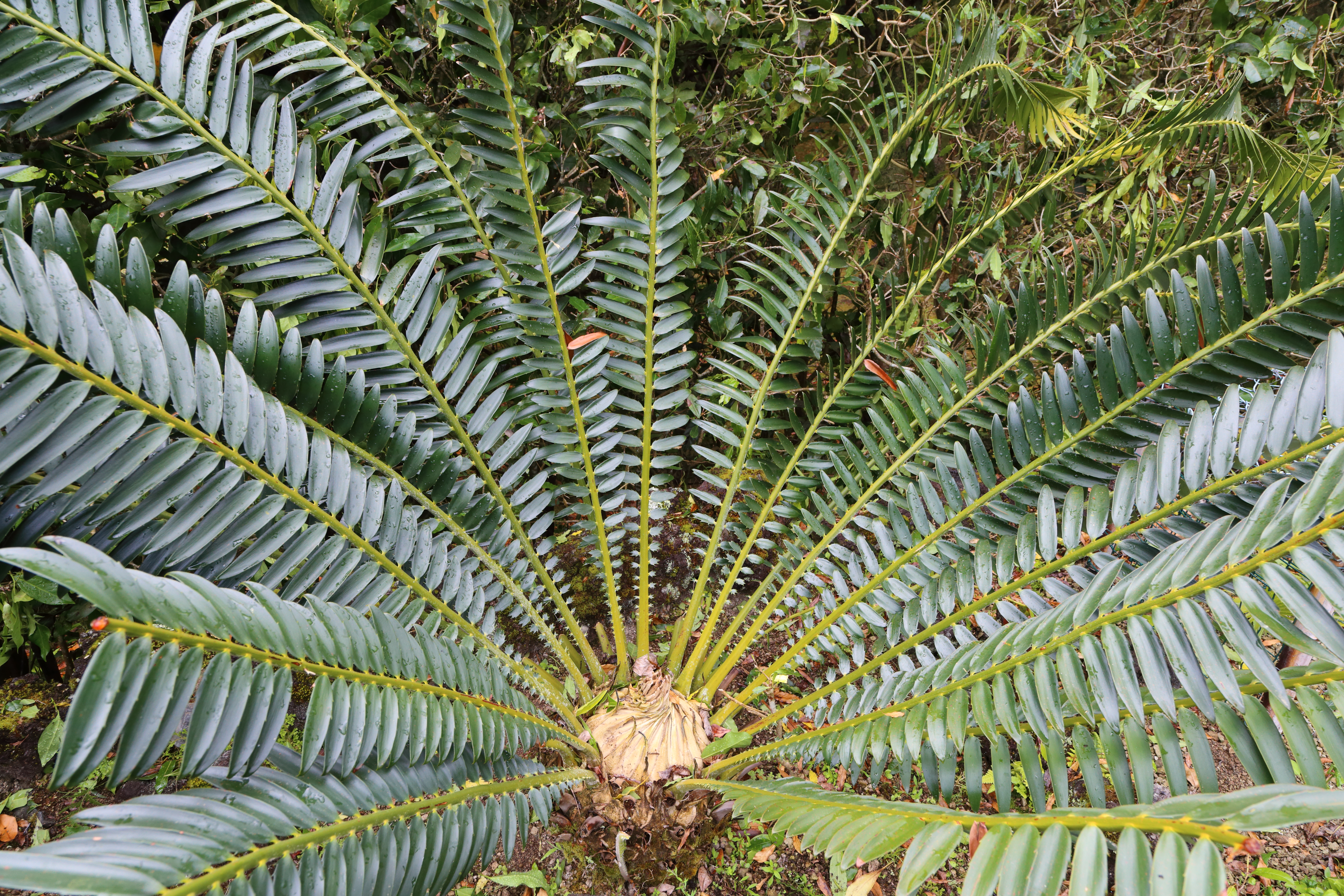

Conservation status
- Vulnerable (IUCN 3.1)
- CITES Appendix I (CITES)

Scientific classification
- Kingdom: Plantae
- Clade: Tracheophytes
- Clade: Gymnospermae
- Division: Cycadophyta
- Class: Cycadopsida
- Order: Cycadales
- Family: Zamiaceae
- Genus: Encephalartos
- Species: E. barteri

Binomial name
- Encephalartos barteri Carruth. ex Miq. 1917

= Encephalartos barteri =

Species of cycad

Encephalartos barteri is a species of cycad that is native to Benin, Ghana, Nigeria, and Togo.

== Description ==
This species is dioecious, meaning it has separate male and female plants. The male cones are spindle-shaped, yellow, and measure 8–23 cm long and 3–5 cm in diameter. They have broad, rhombic-shaped microsporophylls. The female cones are ovoid, green, and larger, measuring 15–35 cm long and 8–15 cm in diameter. Their macrosporophylls have a warty surface. The seeds are oblong, 20–30 mm long, 18–23 mm wide, and covered by a red sarcotesta.

== Range ==
Encephalartos barteri occurs:

- near Tokkos, Plateau State, central Nigeria (Encephalartos barteri ssp. allochrous)
- between Jebba and Ilorin in Nigeria
- Borgou Department and near Savalou in Benin
- Volta River watershed, Ghana
- Togo
