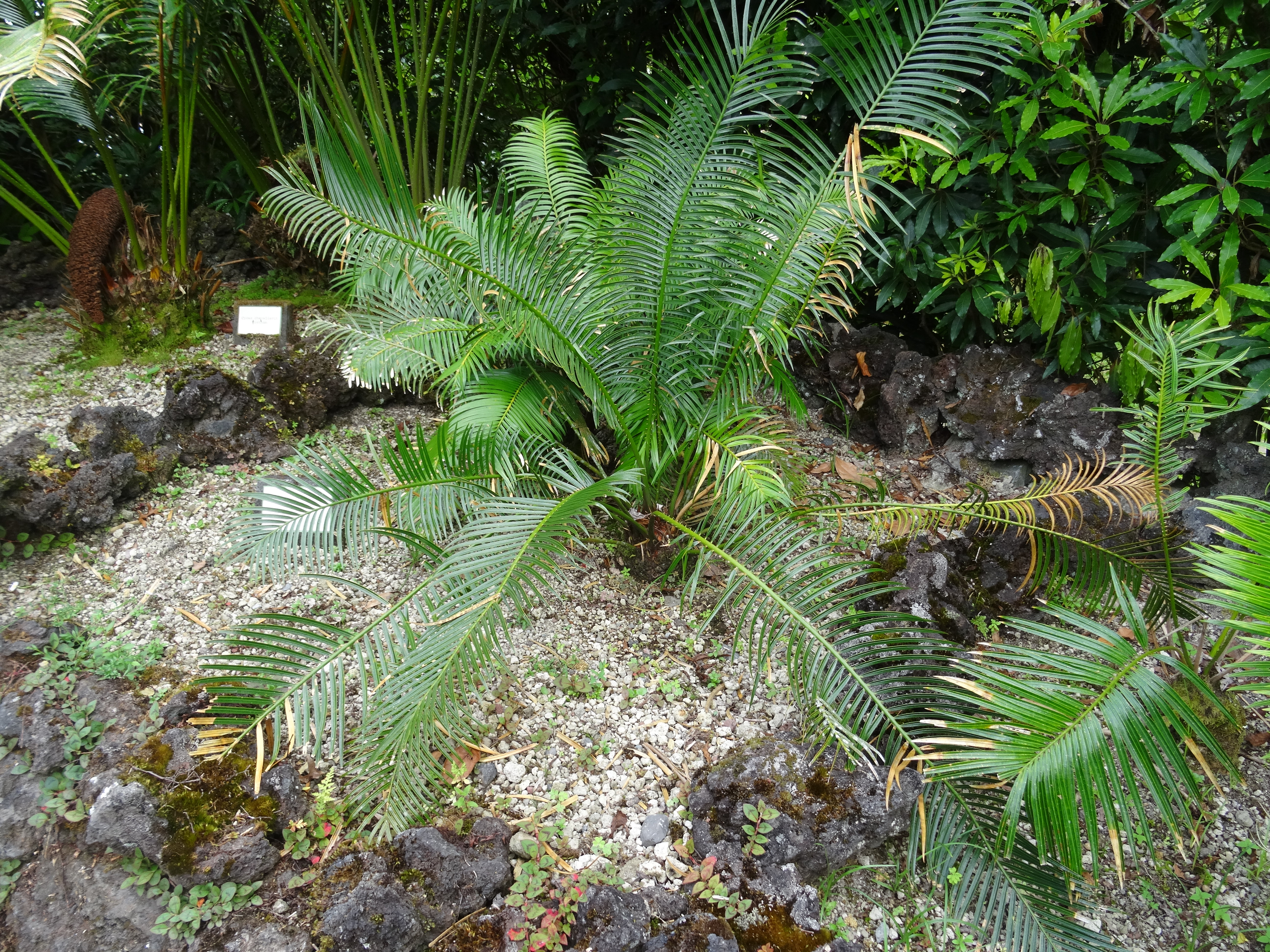
- Cycas sexseminifera

Conservation status
- Near Threatened (IUCN 3.1)

Scientific classification
- Kingdom: Plantae
- Clade: Tracheophytes
- Clade: Gymnospermae
- Division: Cycadophyta
- Class: Cycadopsida
- Order: Cycadales
- Family: Cycadaceae
- Genus: Cycas
- Species: C. sexseminifera

Binomial name
- Cycas sexseminifera F.N.Wei

= Cycas sexseminifera =

Species of cycad

Cycas sexseminifera is a species of cycad in northern Vietnam and southern China.

== Range ==
It is widespread in:

- southern and central Guangxi, China
- Cao Bang Province, Vietnam
- Thanh Hoa Province, Vietnam
