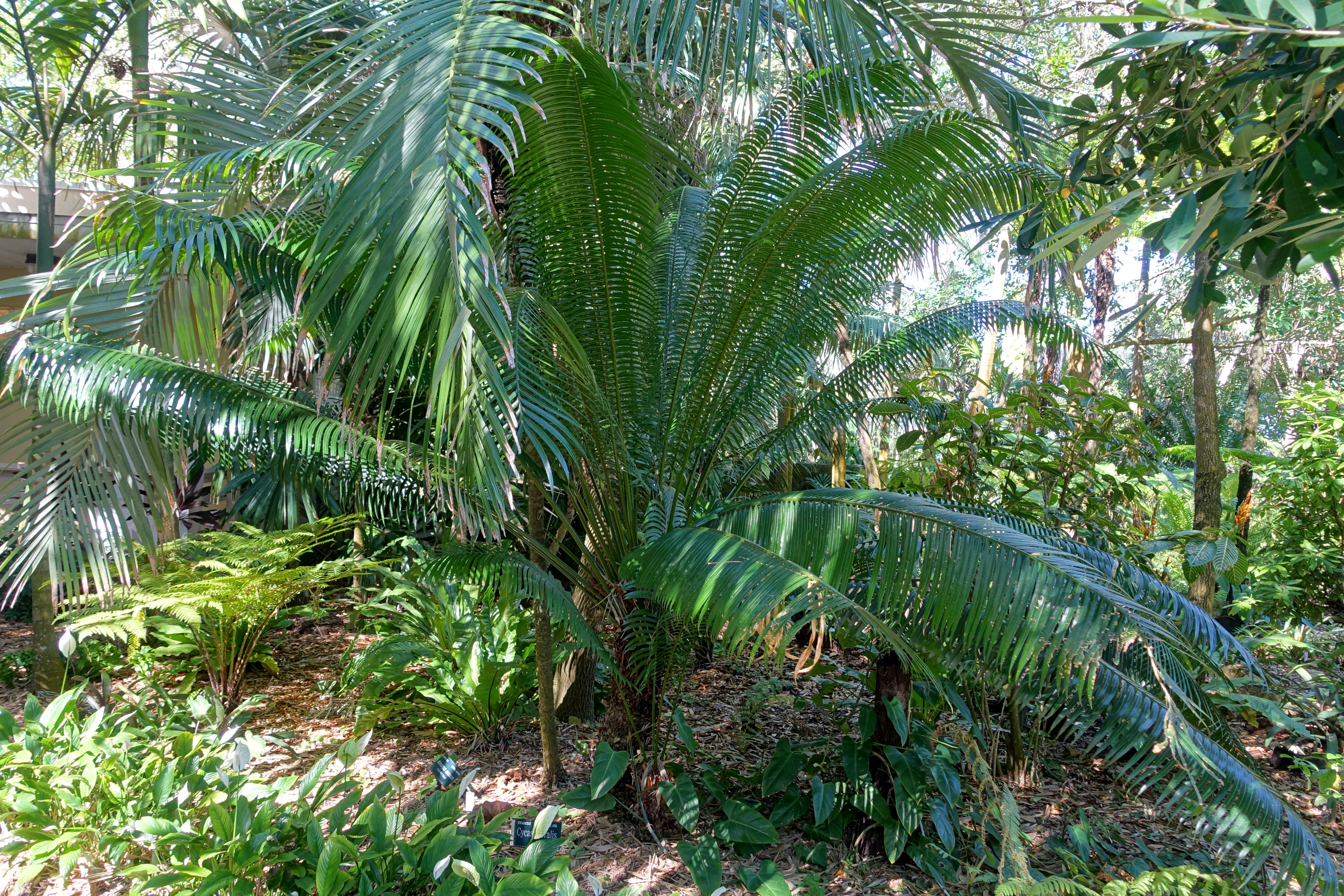

Conservation status
- Near Threatened (IUCN 3.1)

Scientific classification
- Kingdom: Plantae
- Clade: Tracheophytes
- Clade: Gymnospermae
- Division: Cycadophyta
- Class: Cycadopsida
- Order: Cycadales
- Family: Cycadaceae
- Genus: Cycas
- Species: C. edentata

Binomial name
- Cycas edentata de Laub.

Synonyms
- Cycas circinalis f. maritima J.Schust. Cycas litoralis K.D.Hill

= Cycas edentata =

Species of cycad

Cycas edentata is a species of cycad with a widespread distribution across Southeast Asia. It originally referred only to a single population of Cycas from Calusa Island in Cagayancillo, Philippines.
