= Cycas segmentifida =

Conservation status
- Vulnerable (IUCN 3.1)

Scientific classification
- Kingdom: Plantae
- Clade: Tracheophytes
- Clade: Gymnospermae
- Division: Cycadophyta
- Class: Cycadopsida
- Order: Cycadales
- Family: Cycadaceae
- Genus: Cycas
- Species: C. segmentifida

Binomial name
- Cycas segmentifida D.Y.Wang & C.Y.Deng

Species of cycad

Cycas segmentifida is a species of cycad endemic to southern China. It is found in primarily western Guangxi, as well as parts of neighboring southern Guizhou and eastern Yunnan.

== Range ==
In China, Cycas segmentifida is recorded in:

- Guizhou province: Ceheng County, Guiyang, Wangmo County, and Xingyi
- Guangxi province: Nanning and Xilin County
- Yunnan province: Funing County
- Guangdong province: Guangzhou and Shenzhen cities (introduced)

It is also cultivated in Shenzhen Fairy Lake Botanical Garden, South China Botanical Garden, Guizhou Botanical Garden, and the Forestry Academy of Guangxi.
