= Cycas brunnea =

Conservation status
- Near Threatened (IUCN 3.1)

Scientific classification
- Kingdom: Plantae
- Clade: Tracheophytes
- Clade: Gymnospermae
- Division: Cycadophyta
- Class: Cycadopsida
- Order: Cycadales
- Family: Cycadaceae
- Genus: Cycas
- Species: C. brunnea

Binomial name
- Cycas brunnea K.D.Hill

Species of cycad

Cycas brunnea is a species of cycad in the genus Cycas, native to northern Australia in northwest Queensland and northeast Northern Territory in a small area straddling the border of the two regions. It occurs on exposed sites in savanna and creek valleys on sandstone and limestone derived soils, with moderate seasonal rainfall.

The stems grow to 2–5 m tall, with numerous leaves in the crown. The leaves are 1.2-1.7 m long, glabrous with age, pinnate, with 160-240 leaflets, the leaflets 17–27 cm long and 6–7.5 mm wide. The petioles are covered in brown tomentum and armed with sharp spines.

The female cones are open, with sporophylls 28–32 cm long. Orange tomentose covering cone, with serrations along margins of the lamina. The sarcotesta is orange and glaucous, the sclerotesta ovoid and flattened. The male cones are solitary and long ovoid, 21 cm long and 13 cm diameter, brown tomentose, and with an upturned apical spine.

It was first described in 1992, and is similar in appearance to Cycas angulata. It is considered near-threatened due to its restricted range, though it occurs in some protected areas including Boodjamulla National Park. It is named after the Greek word brunneus (brown), as the emergent leaves are brown tomentose.
