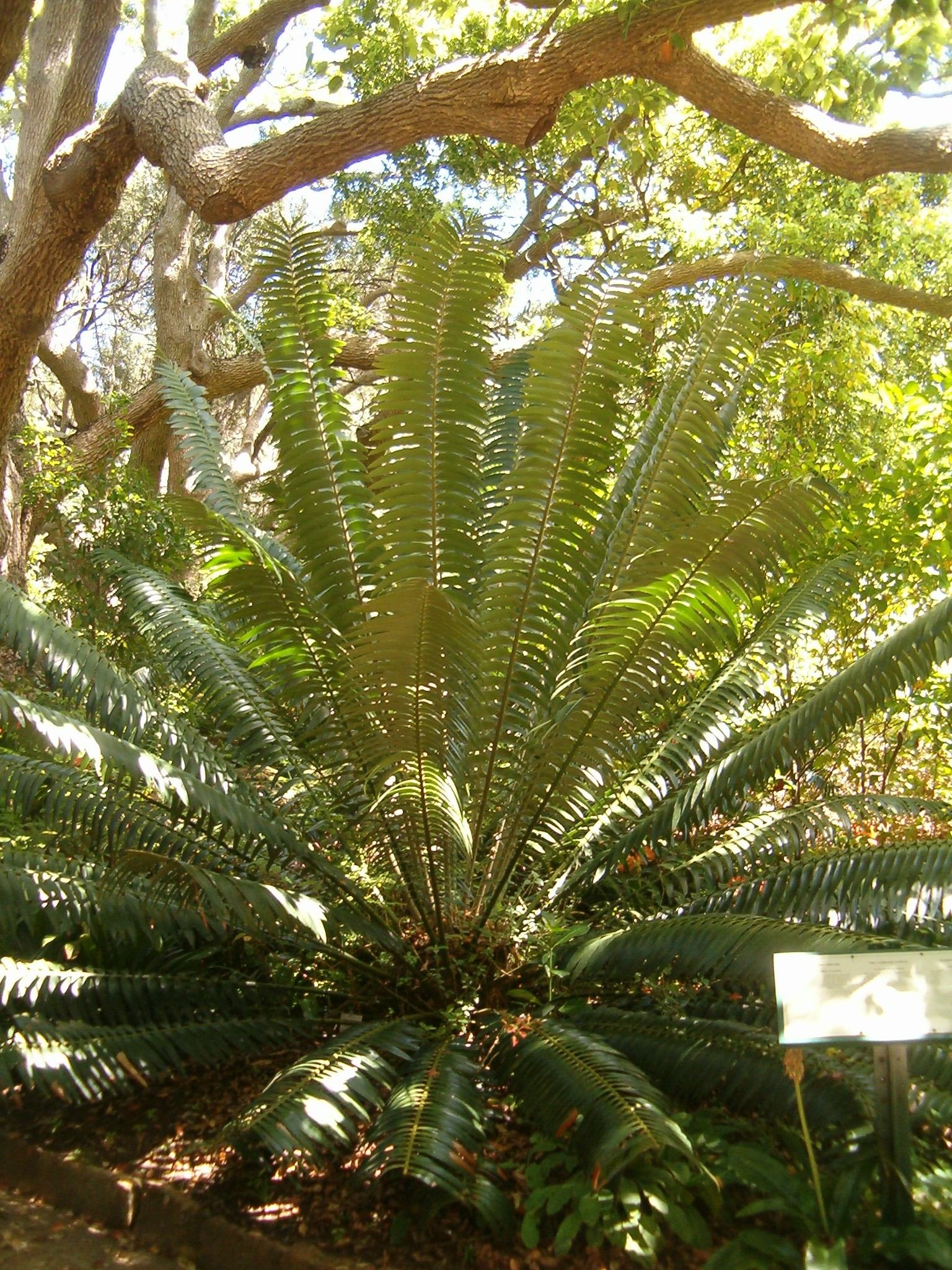

Conservation status
- Vulnerable (IUCN 3.1)
- CITES Appendix I (CITES)

Scientific classification
- Kingdom: Plantae
- Clade: Tracheophytes
- Clade: Gymnospermae
- Division: Cycadophyta
- Class: Cycadopsida
- Order: Cycadales
- Family: Zamiaceae
- Genus: Encephalartos
- Species: E. paucidentatus

Binomial name
- Encephalartos paucidentatus Stapf & Burtt Davy

= Encephalartos paucidentatus =

Species of cycad

Encephalartos paucidentatus is a species of cycad.

It is endemic to the mountains near Barberton in Mpumalanga Province, and near Piggs Peak in the northwestern part of Eswatini, in South Africa.

It grows at elevations of 1,000 to 1,500 meters.

== Description ==
It is a cycad with an erect stem, up to 6 m tall and with a diameter of 40–70 cm, rarely with secondary stems originating from shoots that arise at the base of the main stem.

The leaves, pinnate, 1.5–2.5 m long, are arranged in a crown at the apex of the stem and are supported by a 20–30 cm long petiole, without thorns; each leaf is composed of numerous pairs of lanceolate leaflets, with a toothed margin, on average 15–25 cm long, bright green to yellowish-green, inserted on the yellowish rachis.

It is a dioecious species with male specimens showing 1–5 cones, spindle-shaped, 40–60 cm long and 12–15 cm broad, of golden-brown color, and female specimens with 1–3 ovoid cones, 30–50 cm long and with a diameter of 20–25 cm, yellowish in color.

The seeds are roughly ovoid, 35–40 mm long, covered with a bronze-colored sarcotesta.

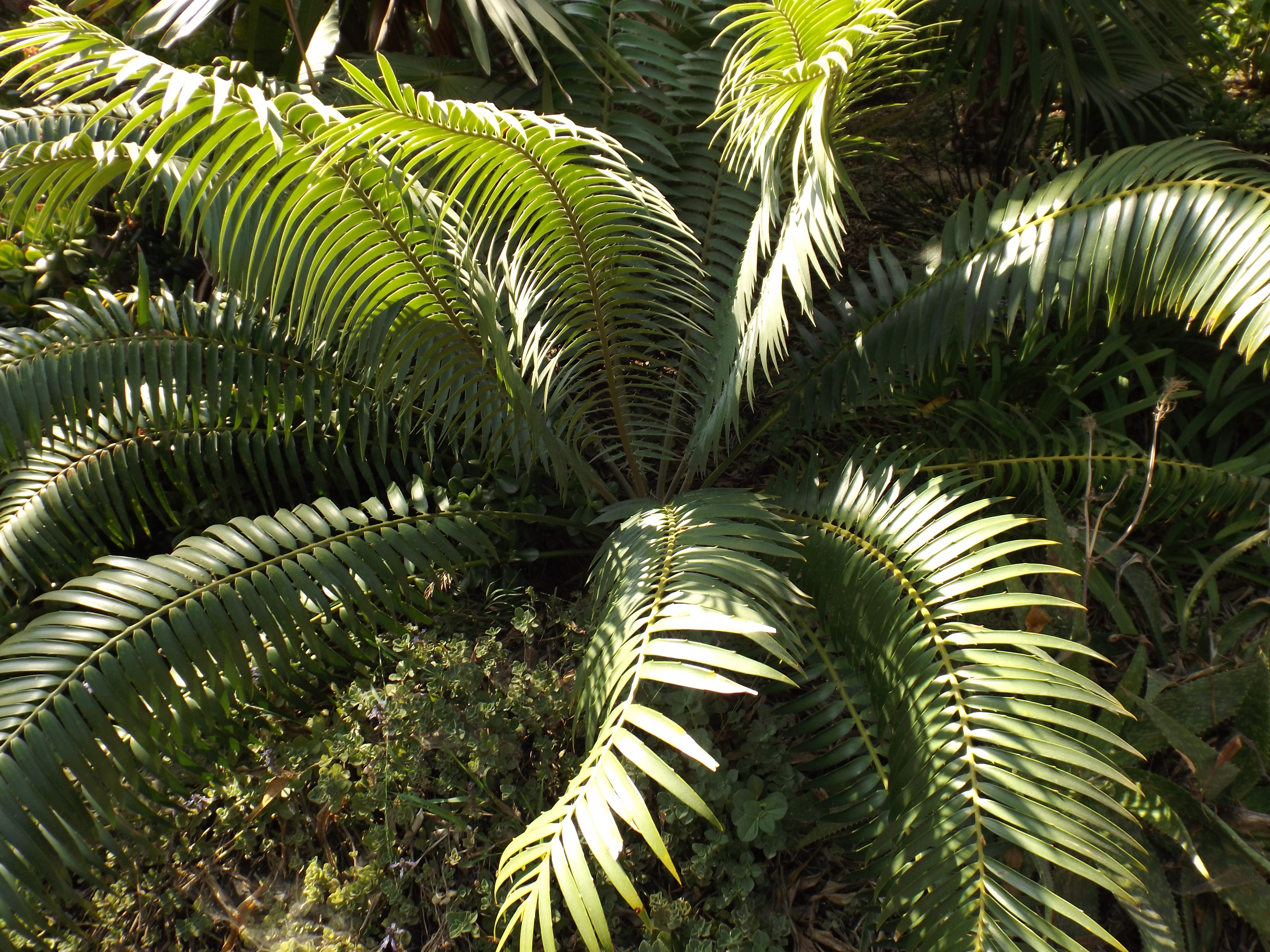
leaves

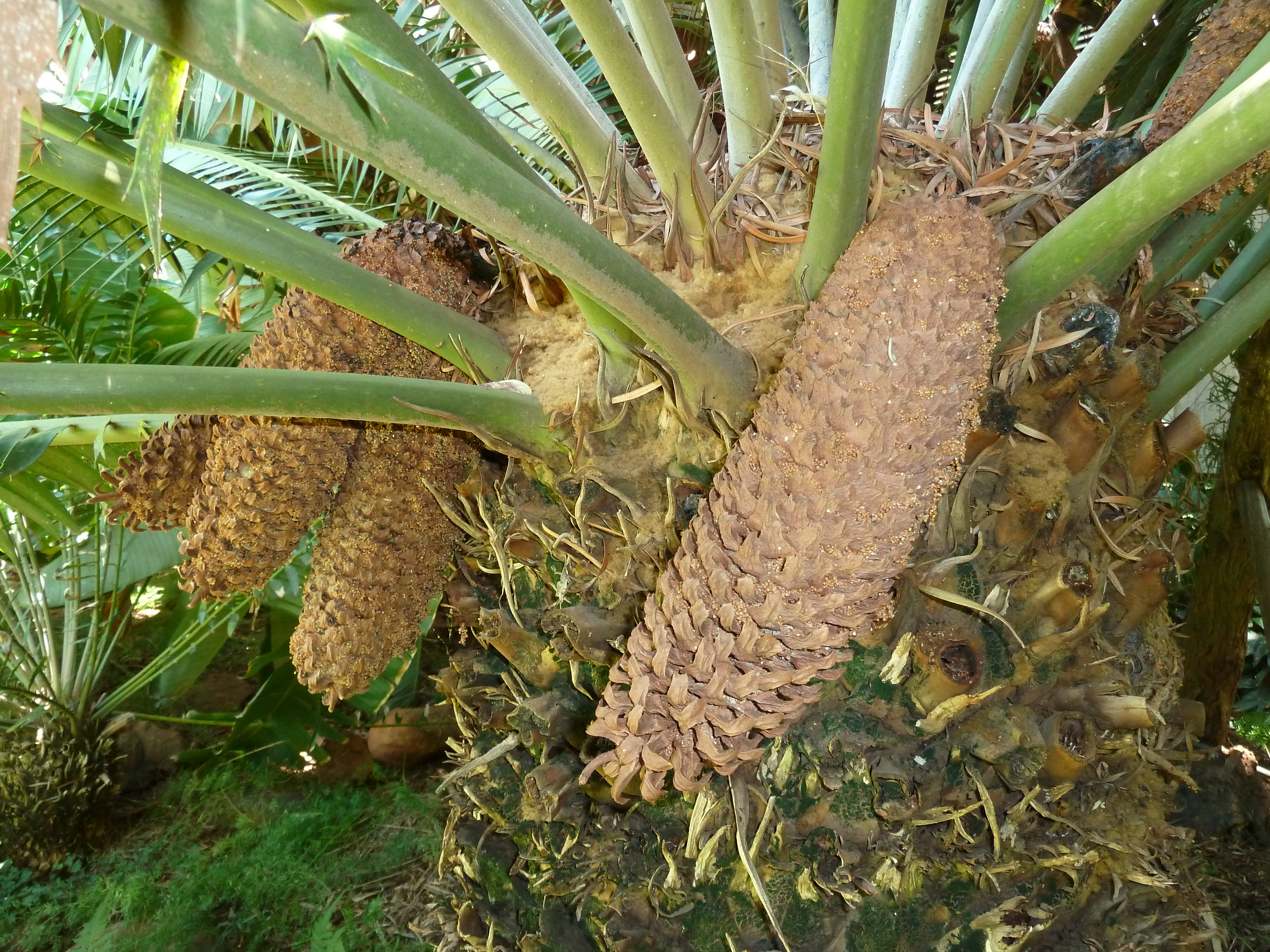
cones

== Etymology ==
The specific epithet paucidentatus is derived from paucus meaning few and dentatus meaning teeth.
