= Cycas brachycantha =

Conservation status
- Vulnerable (IUCN 3.1)
- CITES Appendix II

Scientific classification
- Kingdom: Plantae
- Clade: Tracheophytes
- Clade: Gymnospermae
- Division: Cycadophyta
- Class: Cycadopsida
- Order: Cycadales
- Family: Cycadaceae
- Genus: Cycas
- Species: C. brachycantha

Binomial name
- Cycas brachycantha K.D.Hill, T.H.Nguyen & K.L.Phan

Species of cycad

Cycas brachycantha is a species of cycad in the genus Cycas, native to northern Vietnam where it is endemic to Bắc Kạn Province. It grows in often soil-free cracks and crevices of limestone crests and ridges under the canopy of evergreen forests. It is found in Ba Bể National Park.

It has a short stem 9–10 cm diameter, often subterranean, or up to 1 m tall above ground, bearing 5-10 leaves. The leaves are 1.4-2.5 m long, slightly keeled to flat, very glossy dark green, pinnate, with 100-210 leaflets, each leaflet 20–25 cm long and 10–14 mm wide, angled forward at 70-85°; the leaf apex has a pair of leaflets but no spine. The emerging young leaves are white tomentose, soon becoming glabrous. The petioles are spiny and glabrous.

The female cones are closed type, the sporophylls 8–12 cm long, dense brown tomentose, with two to four glabrous ovules, and soft lateral spines on the lamina, with no apical spine. The sarcotesta is yellow, the sclerotesta rough, ovoid. The male cones solitary and spindle shaped, yellow, 12–14 cm long and 3–4 cm diameter.

The species is named after the Greek word for short, brachys, and spine, acantha.
