= Zamia prasina =

Conservation status
- Critically Endangered (IUCN 3.1)

Scientific classification
- Kingdom: Plantae
- Clade: Tracheophytes
- Clade: Gymnospermae
- Division: Cycadophyta
- Class: Cycadopsida
- Order: Cycadales
- Family: Zamiaceae
- Genus: Zamia
- Species: Z. prasina

Binomial name
- Zamia prasina W.Bull

Synonyms
- Zamia polymorpha D.W.Stev., A.Moretti & Vázq.Torres

Species of cycad

Zamia prasina is a species of plant in the family Zamiaceae. It is native to Yucatán, Campeche, Quintana Roo, Tabasco and Chiapas in Mexico and Guatemala and Belize. Its natural habitat is subtropical or tropical moist montane forests. It is threatened by habitat loss.

== Sources ==
- Nicolalde-Morejón, Fernando; Vovides, Andrew P.; Stevenson, Dennis W. (9 December 2009). "Taxonomic revision of Zamia in Mega-Mexico". Brittonia. 61 (4): 301–335. doi:10.1007/s12228-009-9077-9. ISSN 0007-196X.
