= Encephalartos poggei =

Conservation status
- Least Concern (IUCN 3.1)
- CITES Appendix I

Scientific classification
- Kingdom: Plantae
- Clade: Embryophytes
- Clade: Tracheophytes
- Clade: Spermatophytes
- Clade: Gymnosperms
- Division: Cycadophyta
- Class: Cycadopsida
- Order: Cycadales
- Family: Zamiaceae
- Genus: Encephalartos
- Species: E. poggei

Binomial name
- Encephalartos poggei Asch.

Synonyms
- Encephalartos lemarinelianus De Wild. & T.Durand

Species of plant

Encephalartos poggei is a species of cycad in the family Zamiaceae. It is referred to by the common name Kananga cycad. It is native to Angola, the Democratic Republic of the Congo and Zaire.

== Description ==
This cycad has an upright stem, reaching up to 2 meters (6.6 ft) tall and 20–30 cm (7.9–11.8 in) in diameter. Its pinnate leaves, measuring 70–150 cm (28–59 in) long, form a crown at the top of the stem. Each leaf is supported by a 7–20 cm (2.8–7.9 in) long petiole, lacks thorns, and is covered in a greyish tomentum. The leaves are composed of 18–60 pairs of lanceolate, leathery leaflets, averaging 8-15 centimeters long, and have a glaucous green color.

This species is dioecious, with male specimens bearing 1–3 cones that are sub-cylindrical, 16–20 cm (6.3–7.9 in) long, and 3–7 cm (1.2–2.8 in) wide. These cones are greenish to orange-yellow. Female specimens have 1–3 ovoid cones, 17–23 cm (6.7–9.1 in) long and 9–12 cm (3.5–4.7 in) in diameter, initially green and turning yellow when ripe.

The seeds are roughly ovoid, measuring 20–33 millimeters long, and are covered with a red-brownish sarcotesta.

== Range ==
It occurs in:

- Shaba Province, DRC: near Kasidiji, Kanda-Kanda, and Gonzo
- Kasai Occidental, DRC: near Luluaborg
- Lunda Sul Province, Angola: near Sombo
