= Zamia urep =

Conservation status
- Critically Endangered (IUCN 3.1)

Scientific classification
- Kingdom: Plantae
- Clade: Tracheophytes
- Clade: Gymnospermae
- Division: Cycadophyta
- Class: Cycadopsida
- Order: Cycadales
- Family: Zamiaceae
- Genus: Zamia
- Species: Z. urep

Binomial name
- Zamia urep B.Walln.

Species of plant

Zamia urep is a species of plant in the family Zamiaceae. It is endemic to Yuyapichis District (also spelled Llullapichis), Pachitea Province, Huanuco Region, Peru. It is threatened by habitat loss.
