= Zamia hymenophyllidia =

Conservation status
- Least Concern (IUCN 3.1)

Scientific classification
- Kingdom: Plantae
- Clade: Embryophytes
- Clade: Tracheophytes
- Clade: Spermatophytes
- Clade: Gymnospermae
- Division: Cycadophyta
- Class: Cycadopsida
- Order: Cycadales
- Family: Zamiaceae
- Genus: Zamia
- Species: Z. hymenophyllidia

Binomial name
- Zamia hymenophyllidia D.W.Stev.

Species of cycad

Zamia hymenophyllidia is a species of plant in the family Zamiaceae. It is a subshrub native to southeastern Colombia and northern Peru.
