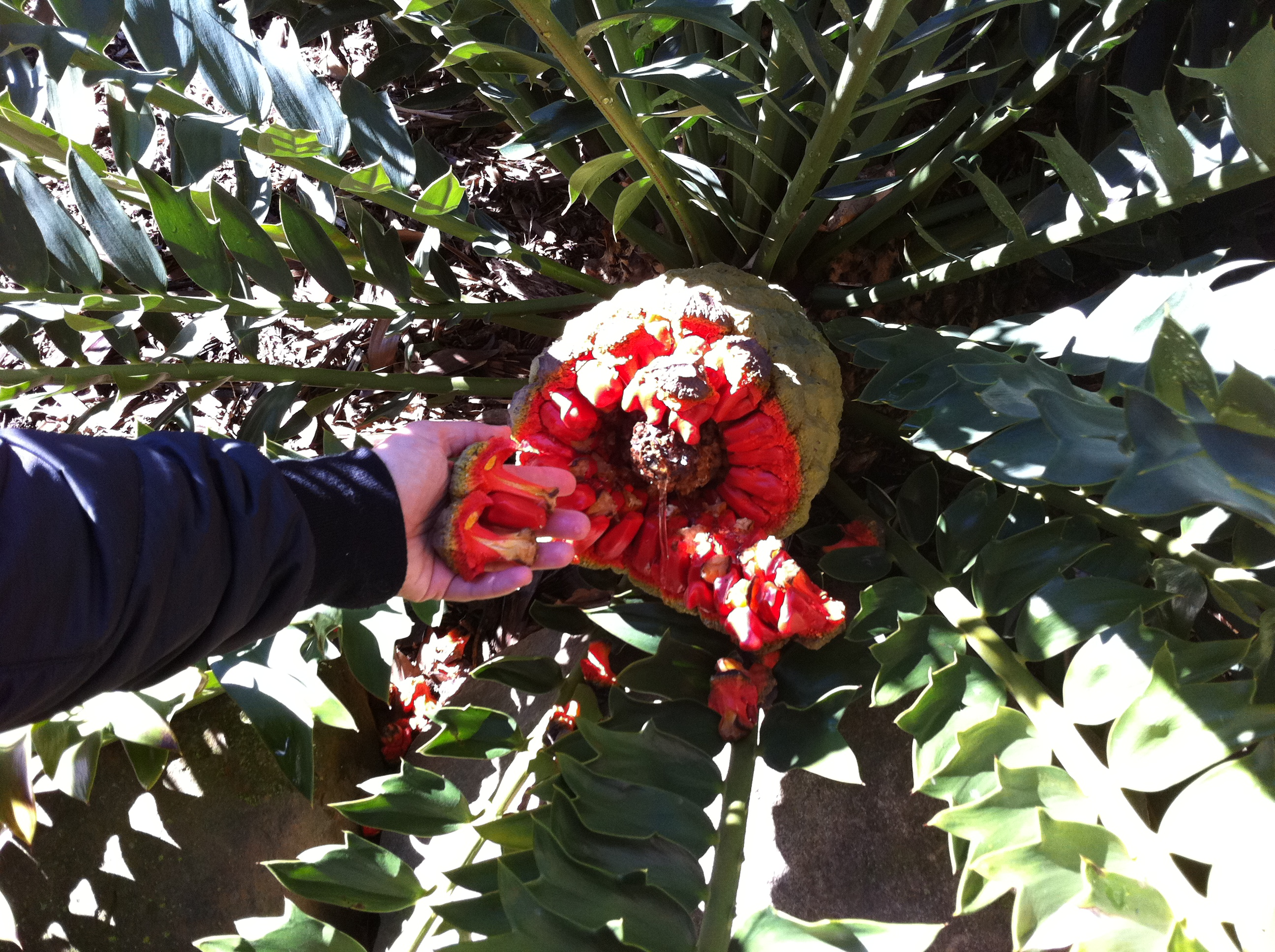
- Female cone of Encephalartos ituriensis showing red seeds and dripping "nectar."

Conservation status
- Near Threatened (IUCN 3.1)
- CITES Appendix I (CITES)

Scientific classification
- Kingdom: Plantae
- Clade: Tracheophytes
- Clade: Gymnospermae
- Division: Cycadophyta
- Class: Cycadopsida
- Order: Cycadales
- Family: Zamiaceae
- Genus: Encephalartos
- Species: E. ituriensis

Binomial name
- Encephalartos ituriensis P. Bamps & Lisowski

= Encephalartos ituriensis =

Species of cycad

Encephalartos ituriensis (common name Ituri Forest cycad) is a palm-like cycad of the family Zamiaceae. It is native to the grassland on two large granite monadnocks of the Ituri forest area in the Democratic Republic of the Congo. Its IUCN conservation status is "Near Threatened."

== Description ==
This cycad grows to 6 metres tall with a trunk diameter of 50 cm. It has glossy dark green leaves. The leaflets are curved and tapering, with a spine at the top and several teeth along the margin.

Like other cycads, E. ituriensis is dioecious, with both male and female trees. Male trees have 1–4 pollen cones, narrowly ovoid. Female trees have 1 or 2 seed cones, which are ovoid and 18–20 cm long. The seeds have a red sarcotesta.
