= Cycas collina =

Conservation status
- Critically Endangered (IUCN 3.1)

Scientific classification
- Kingdom: Plantae
- Clade: Tracheophytes
- Clade: Gymnospermae
- Division: Cycadophyta
- Class: Cycadopsida
- Order: Cycadales
- Family: Cycadaceae
- Genus: Cycas
- Species: C. collina

Binomial name
- Cycas collina K.D.Hill, H.T.Nguyen & P.K.Lôc

Species of cycad

Cycas collina is a species of cycad. It is found in the Mai Sơn area of Sơn La Province, Vietnam.
