= Cycas ferruginea =

Conservation status
- Near Threatened (IUCN 3.1)

Scientific classification
- Kingdom: Plantae
- Clade: Tracheophytes
- Clade: Gymnospermae
- Division: Cycadophyta
- Class: Cycadopsida
- Order: Cycadales
- Family: Cycadaceae
- Genus: Cycas
- Species: C. ferruginea

Binomial name
- Cycas ferruginea F.N. Wei

Species of cycad

Cycas ferruginea is a plant species native to Vietnam and to the Guangxi region of China. It grows on rocky crevices in forested areas at elevations of 200–500 m. It is known from a belt of limestone bluffs in Lang Son Province and Thai Nguyen Province in Vietnam, and in western Guangxi Province, China. It is also cultivated at the Guilin Botanical Garden, Guangxi.

Cycas ferruginea has pinnate leaves up to 2 m long. Seeds are brown, egg-shaped, up to 3 cm long.
