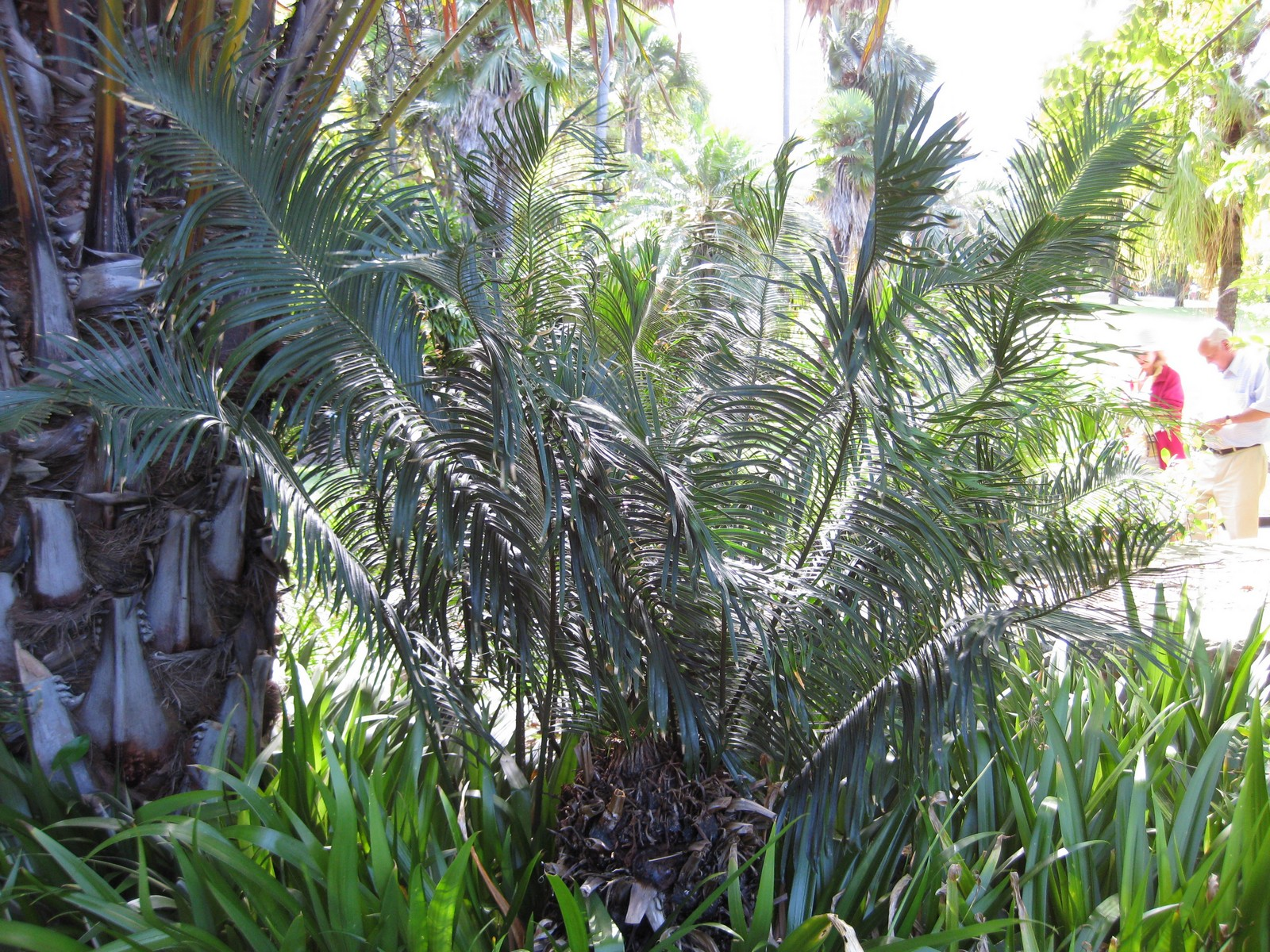

Conservation status
- Vulnerable (IUCN 3.1)

Scientific classification
- Kingdom: Plantae
- Clade: Tracheophytes
- Clade: Gymnospermae
- Division: Cycadophyta
- Class: Cycadopsida
- Order: Cycadales
- Family: Cycadaceae
- Genus: Cycas
- Species: C. guizhouensis

Binomial name
- Cycas guizhouensis K.M.Lan & R.F.Zou

= Cycas guizhouensis =

Species of cycad

Cycas guizhouensis is a species of cycad endemic to southwestern China.

== Distribution ==
It is found in Nanpan and Qingshui valleys in southwestern Guizhou province (including Xingyi) and also in eastern Yunnan and northwestern Guangxi provinces (including Xilin County and Leye County). In Xingyi, Guizhou, specimens were collected from Wantun Village 万屯村. It was used as a famine food by local ethnic minorities during the Cultural Revolution.

Wild populations are very small, with fewer than 50 individuals per population.
