= Cycas sphaerica =

Conservation status
- Data Deficient (IUCN 3.1)

Scientific classification
- Kingdom: Plantae
- Clade: Tracheophytes
- Clade: Gymnospermae
- Division: Cycadophyta
- Class: Cycadopsida
- Order: Cycadales
- Family: Cycadaceae
- Genus: Cycas
- Species: C. sphaerica

Binomial name
- Cycas sphaerica Roxb.

Species of cycad

Cycas sphaerica (also called, Cycas spherica) is a plant mainly found in the Indian state of Andhra Pradesh. The species was thought to be found in Odisha previously, but a recent publication found that the species is restricted to Andhra Pradesh. On the other hand, two endemic species viz. Cycas orixensis and Cycas nayagarhensis are found in Odisha.

Cycas sphaerica grows on high hills and dry lands and is listed on Appendix II of the CITES Appendices.

Cycas sphaerica was first mentioned in 1814 by Roxburgh.
