= Cycas fairylakea =

Conservation status
- Critically Endangered (IUCN 3.1)

Scientific classification
- Kingdom: Plantae
- Clade: Tracheophytes
- Clade: Gymnospermae
- Division: Cycadophyta
- Class: Cycadopsida
- Order: Cycadales
- Family: Cycadaceae
- Genus: Cycas
- Species: C. fairylakea

Binomial name
- Cycas fairylakea D.Yue Wang

Synonyms
- Cycas szechuanensis fairylakea

Species of cycad

Cycas fairylakea is a species of cycad endemic to China. There are only two subpopulations left in eastern Guangdong province, China.

Cycas fairylakea can be considered as a subspecies of Cycas szechuanensis.
