= Cycas elephantipes =

Conservation status
- Endangered (IUCN 3.1)

Scientific classification
- Kingdom: Plantae
- Clade: Tracheophytes
- Clade: Gymnospermae
- Division: Cycadophyta
- Class: Cycadopsida
- Order: Cycadales
- Family: Cycadaceae
- Genus: Cycas
- Species: C. elephantipes

Binomial name
- Cycas elephantipes A.Lindstr. & K.D.Hill

Species of cycad

Cycas elephantipes is a species of cycad. It is found only on a few high sandstone mesas in Nong Bua Rawe District, Chaiyaphum Province, northeastern Thailand. It is morphologically similar to Cycas pachypoda from southern Vietnam.
