= Cycas schumanniana =

Conservation status
- Near Threatened (IUCN 3.1)

Scientific classification
- Kingdom: Plantae
- Clade: Tracheophytes
- Clade: Gymnospermae
- Division: Cycadophyta
- Class: Cycadopsida
- Order: Cycadales
- Family: Cycadaceae
- Genus: Cycas
- Species: C. schumanniana

Binomial name
- Cycas schumanniana Lauterb.

Species of cycad

Cycas schumanniana is a species of cycad endemic to New Guinea.

== Range ==
It is found in northern New Guinea along the foothills of the Bismarck Range, where it is found in the valleys of the Markham River, Ramu River, and Bulolo River watersheds as far as Wau, Papua New Guinea.
