= Cycas vespertilio =

Scientific classification
- Kingdom: Plantae
- Clade: Tracheophytes
- Clade: Gymnospermae
- Division: Cycadophyta
- Class: Cycadopsida
- Order: Cycadales
- Family: Cycadaceae
- Genus: Cycas
- Species: C. vespertilio

Binomial name
- Cycas vespertilio A.Lindstr. & K.D.Hill

Species of cycad

Cycas vespertilio is a species of cycad endemic to the Philippines.

== Range ==
Cycas vespertilio has been recorded in:

- Luzon: Camarines Sur (Panagan River)
- Mindoro: Mindoro Oriental (Mount Yagaw)
- Marinduque (Torrijos, Bonliw, Talisay)
- Panay: Iloilo (Barotac Viejo, Nagpana)
- Negros: Negros Oriental and Occidental
- Cebu
- Leyte: Leyte (Gigantangan)
- Samar
