= Cycas pranburiensis =

Conservation status
- Vulnerable (IUCN 3.1)

Scientific classification
- Kingdom: Plantae
- Clade: Tracheophytes
- Clade: Gymnospermae
- Division: Cycadophyta
- Class: Cycadopsida
- Order: Cycadales
- Family: Cycadaceae
- Genus: Cycas
- Species: C. pranburiensis

Binomial name
- Cycas pranburiensis S.L.Yang, W.Tang, K.D.Hill & P.Vatcharakorn

Species of cycad

Cycas pranburiensis is a species of cycad endemic to Thailand. It is found only in the Khao Sam Roi Yot National Park area of Prachuap Khiri Khan Province. It is named after Pran Buri District in Thailand, where it was discovered.
