= Cycas distans =

Conservation status
- Endangered (IUCN 3.1)
- Endangered (NCA)

Scientific classification
- Kingdom: Plantae
- Clade: Tracheophytes
- Clade: Gymnospermae
- Division: Cycadophyta
- Class: Cycadopsida
- Order: Cycadales
- Family: Cycadaceae
- Genus: Cycas
- Species: C. distans

Binomial name
- Cycas distans P.I.Forst. & B.Gray

Species of cycad

Cycas distans is a species of cycad in the genus Cycas endemic to Queensland, Australia. It lives in savannah habitats. It is split into two subpopulations and there are very few seeding and juvenile plants in the subpopulations. It is also possible that more subpopulations are to be discovered. It is estimated that only about 1000-1500 individuals survive today.
