= Cycas aenigma =

Scientific classification
- Kingdom: Plantae
- Clade: Tracheophytes
- Clade: Gymnospermae
- Division: Cycadophyta
- Class: Cycadopsida
- Order: Cycadales
- Family: Cycadaceae
- Genus: Cycas
- Species: C. aenigma

Binomial name
- Cycas aenigma K.D.Hill & A.Lindstr.

Species of cycad

Cycas aenigma is a species of cycad endemic to the Philippines.

== Range ==
Cycas aenigma is known only in cultivation in Puerto Princesa City, Palawan.
