= Cycas arenicola =

Conservation status
- Least Concern (IUCN 3.1)

Scientific classification
- Kingdom: Plantae
- Clade: Tracheophytes
- Clade: Gymnospermae
- Division: Cycadophyta
- Class: Cycadopsida
- Order: Cycadales
- Family: Cycadaceae
- Genus: Cycas
- Species: C. arenicola

Binomial name
- Cycas arenicola K.D.Hill

Species of cycad

Cycas arenicola is a species of cycad in the genus Cycas, native to Australia, in the far north of Northern Territory in the basin of the upper East Alligator River in Arnhem Land. It grows in Eucalyptus woodlands on highly siliceous soils (sandstone derived). They thrive in open situations.

The stems reach 1.5 m (rarely 2.5 m) tall, with a diameter of 15–20 cm. The leaves are numerous, 0.9-1.6 m long, pinnate with 180-200 leaflets, glossy bright green above, pubescent beneath with brown pubescence, the leaflets are oriented 60-90 degrees forward without overlapping. The petiole is brown pubescent, 25–35 cm long, armed with spines.

The female cones open, with sporophylls 15–20 cm long, grey with orange hairs, each with 4-6 ovules. Margins toothed, with bright orange sarcotesta when ripened. The male cones are solitary, spindle shaped, 25 cm long and 9 cm diameter.

The name derives from Latin arena and -cola, "sand dweller", the species growing in sandstone habitats.

First described in 1993 by Hill, the plant is not thought to be threatened as its range occurs on Aboriginal land and is very remote. The plant is dependent on very dry, seasonally variable conditions, and is susceptible to crown rot.
