= Cycas desolata =

Conservation status
- Near Threatened (IUCN 3.1)

Scientific classification
- Kingdom: Plantae
- Clade: Embryophytes
- Clade: Tracheophytes
- Clade: Spermatophytes
- Clade: Gymnospermae
- Division: Cycadophyta
- Class: Cycadopsida
- Order: Cycadales
- Family: Cycadaceae
- Genus: Cycas
- Species: C. desolata

Binomial name
- Cycas desolata P.I.Forst.

Species of cycad

Cycas desolata is a species of cycad, native only to Queensland, Australia. The stem typically grows to about 4 meters (13.1 ft) tall, though it can grow as tall as 8 m (26.2 ft).
