= Cycas tuckeri =

Conservation status
- Vulnerable (IUCN 3.1)

Scientific classification
- Kingdom: Plantae
- Clade: Embryophytes
- Clade: Tracheophytes
- Clade: Spermatophytes
- Clade: Gymnospermae
- Division: Cycadophyta
- Class: Cycadopsida
- Order: Cycadales
- Family: Cycadaceae
- Genus: Cycas
- Species: C. tuckeri

Binomial name
- Cycas tuckeri K.D.Hill

Species of cycad

Cycas tuckeri is a species of cycad. It is native to Queensland, Australia, where it is confined to the Cape York Peninsula.
