= Cycas condaoensis =

Conservation status
- Least Concern (IUCN 3.1)

Scientific classification
- Kingdom: Plantae
- Clade: Tracheophytes
- Clade: Gymnospermae
- Division: Cycadophyta
- Class: Cycadopsida
- Order: Cycadales
- Family: Cycadaceae
- Genus: Cycas
- Species: C. condaoensis

Binomial name
- Cycas condaoensis K.D.Hill & S.L.Yang

Species of cycad

Cycas condaoensis is a species of cycad endemic to the Côn Đảo Islands off the coast of southern Vietnam.
