= Cycas javana =

Conservation status
- Critically Endangered (IUCN 3.1)

Scientific classification
- Kingdom: Plantae
- Clade: Tracheophytes
- Clade: Gymnospermae
- Division: Cycadophyta
- Class: Cycadopsida
- Order: Cycadales
- Family: Cycadaceae
- Genus: Cycas
- Species: C. javana

Binomial name
- Cycas javana (Miq.) de Laub.

Species of cycad

Cycas javana is a species of cycad in Indonesia. It is found primarily in Java, as well as southern Sumatra and possibly the western Sunda Islands.
