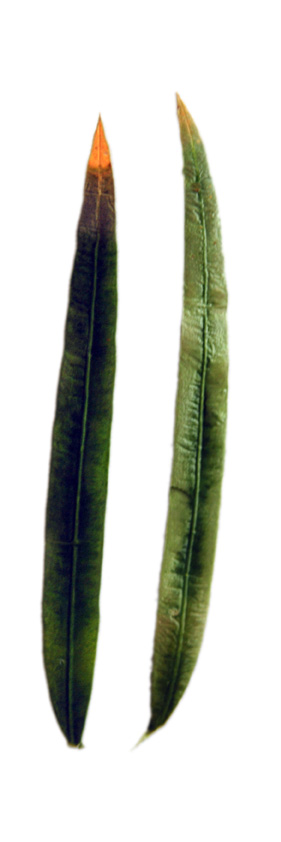
- Young leaflets

Conservation status
- Critically Endangered (IUCN 3.1)

Scientific classification
- Kingdom: Plantae
- Clade: Tracheophytes
- Clade: Gymnospermae
- Division: Cycadophyta
- Class: Cycadopsida
- Order: Cycadales
- Family: Cycadaceae
- Genus: Cycas
- Species: C. tansachana

Binomial name
- Cycas tansachana K.D.Hill & S.L.Yang

= Cycas tansachana =

Species of cycad

Cycas tansachana is a species of cycad in Thailand. They are located to the northeast of Khong Khi Sua in Kaeng Khoi District, Saraburi Province, central Thailand. It is also found in Praphotisat Cave Temple Huai Haeng (ห้วยแห้ง) Subdistrict, Kaeng Khoi District. It is locally abundant, but has a highly restricted distribution.
