= Cycas canalis =

Conservation status
- Least Concern (IUCN 3.1)
- CITES Appendix II

Scientific classification
- Kingdom: Plantae
- Clade: Tracheophytes
- Clade: Gymnospermae
- Division: Cycadophyta
- Class: Cycadopsida
- Order: Cycadales
- Family: Cycadaceae
- Genus: Cycas
- Species: C. canalis

Binomial name
- Cycas canalis K.D.Hill

Species of cycad

Cycas canalis is a species of cycad in the genus Cycas, native to northern Australia in the northwest of Northern Territory, where it occurs in two areas, on the coast at Channel Point, and inland in the Daly River area near Dorisvale.

== Description ==
The stems are erect, growing to 3–5 m tall and 7–14 cm diameter. The leaves are blue-green fading to green, 60–105 cm long, pinnate, with 100-170 leaflets. The leaflets are 10–20.5 cm long and 4.5–8 mm wide, and lie flat or in a shallow 'v'-shape on either side of the leaf stem. The petioles are 15–25 cm long, and armed with sharp spines for most of their length.

The female cones are open, with sporophylls 16–25 cm long, with two to four ovules per sporophyll. The lamina is lanceolate, with spined dentate margins and an apical spine. The male cones are solitary, ovoid, 15–22 cm long and 8–12 cm diameter, orange, the sporophylls 35–45 mm long with an upturned apical spine.

Two subspecies are recognised:

- Cycas canalis subsp. canalis. Coastal. Leaves flat, 60–90 cm long.
- Cycas canalis subsp. carinata. Inland. Leaves moderately 'v'-shaped, 70–105 cm long.
