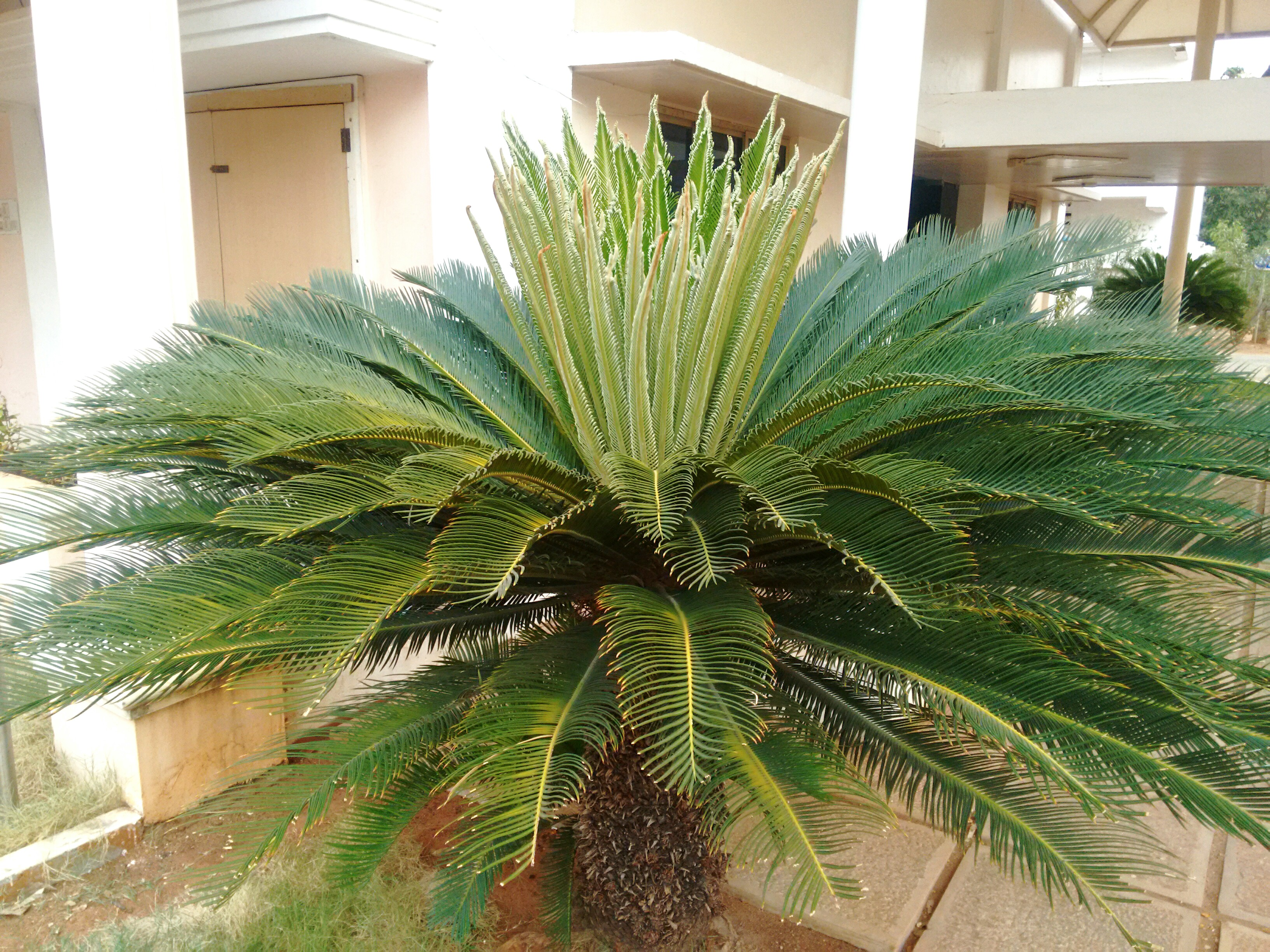
- A large Cycas under development

Scientific classification
- Kingdom: Plantae
- Clade: Tracheophytes
- Clade: Gymnosperms
- Division: Cycadophyta
- Class: Cycadopsida
- Order: Cycadales
- Suborder: Cycadineae
- Family: Cycadaceae; Pers.
- Genus: Cycas; L.

Type species
- C. circinalis L.
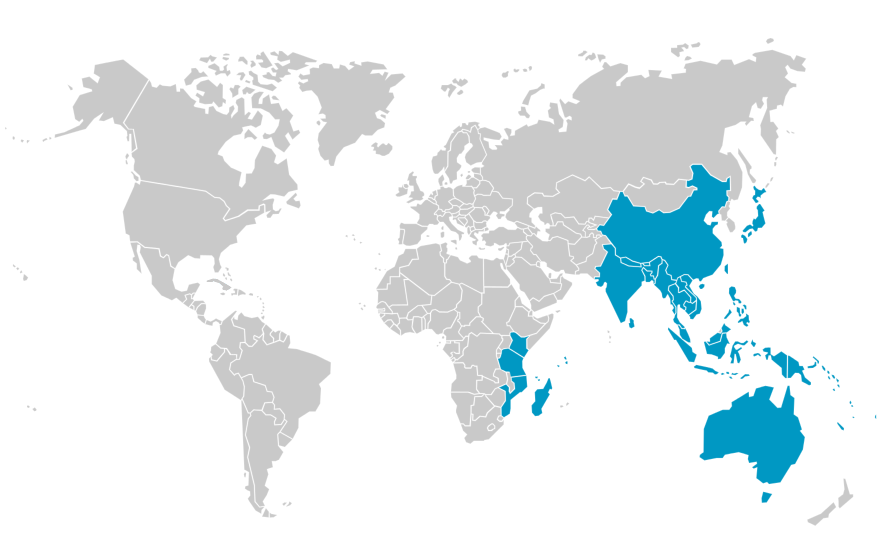

Synonyms
- Dyerocycas Nakai; Epicycas de Laub.; Todda-pana Adans.

= Cycas =

Cycas Temporal range: Paleogene–Recent

Genus of plants

Cycas is a genus of cycad, and the only genus in the family Cycadaceae, with all other genera of cycad being within the Zamiaceae family. Cycas circinalis, a species endemic to India, was the first cycad species to be described in Western literature, and is the type species of the genus.

As of April 2024, there are 119 accepted species within the genus Cycas, native to Asia, Oceania, and eastern Africa and the Indian Ocean region, with the largest number of species native to Australia, China and Vietnam.

In horticulture, the most widely grown and perhaps best-known Cycas species is Cycas revoluta, which is commercially grown in large numbers for sale as houseplants or to be used in landscaping.

The majority of Cycas species are highly endangered. Many are threatened by the illegal trade of wild collected plants for plant collectors, and through the conversion of land for urban development or agricultural use.

== Name ==
In his Historia Plantarum, Theophrastus called the doum palm (Hyphaene thebaica) κόϊκας, the accusative plural of κόϊξ. A scribal error transformed this to κύκας in early printed editions, the form which Carl Linnaeus adopted. The stem cycad- is a back-formation.

== Range ==
The genus Cycas is native to parts of Asia, eastern Africa and Oceania. Cycas has the widest distribution of any genus of cycad.

In Asia, Cycas (and therefore, the family Cycadaceae) represent the only cycads native to Asia. Within Asia, Cycas species are native from India and Sri Lanka in the west, through China to Japan in the north east and through Southeast Asia (including the Philippines) to Indonesia in the south. Globally, the northernmost species ( Cycas revoluta) is found at 31°N in southern Japan.

As of April 2024, the largest number of currently accepted species of Cycas in Asia are found in Vietnam (27 species), China (23 species), India (14 species), Thailand (12 species), Philippines (12 species) and Indonesia (10 species). The distribution of Cycas species in Myanmar, Laos, and Cambodia is not well known, but as of April 2024, no accepted cycad species is known to be endemic to any of these three countries.

In Africa, cycads belonging to all two cycad families are found making it a major center of diversity for cycads in general, but only one Cycas species (Cycas thouarsii) is native and it is restricted to eastern Africa and nearby island nations. Cycas thouarsii grows in a comparatively wide area including coastal regions of Mozambique, Tanzania, and Kenya in mainland Africa, extending to Seychelles, Madagascar and the Comoros islands in the Indian Ocean.

In Oceania, Cycas species are native to Australia, Papua New Guinea, and the island nations of the Pacific Ocean region, but are absent from New Zealand. As in Asia, Cycas is the only genus of cycad found across the region, with the exception for Australia, where cycads native to all three families of cycads are found. Despite this, Australia also has the largest number of Cycas species globally with 34 native Cycas species accepted (as of April 2024), including the southernmost species globally (Cycas megacarpa) found at 26°S in southeast Queensland. At least 7 Cycas species are found in Papua New Guinea, some of which are also found in parts of neighbouring Indonesia. In the broader region, Cycas seemannii is found in Melanesia and western Polynesia and Cycas micronesica is found across Micronesia.

Globally, some Cycas species are considered to be relatively widespread, for example Cycas thouarsii is native to a large area of mainland Africa and islands of the Indian Ocean, and Cycas pectinata and Cycas clivicola are both native to large areas of Asia; however, most Cycas species have restricted distributions, with some restricted to very small areas. In Asia, for example, more than 75% of species occur in no more than one country. For some countries, even though the number of species may not be high, the level of species-specific genetic variation can be very high meaning that so that even countries with few species, it may contain distinct gene pools of widespread species.

== Evolution ==
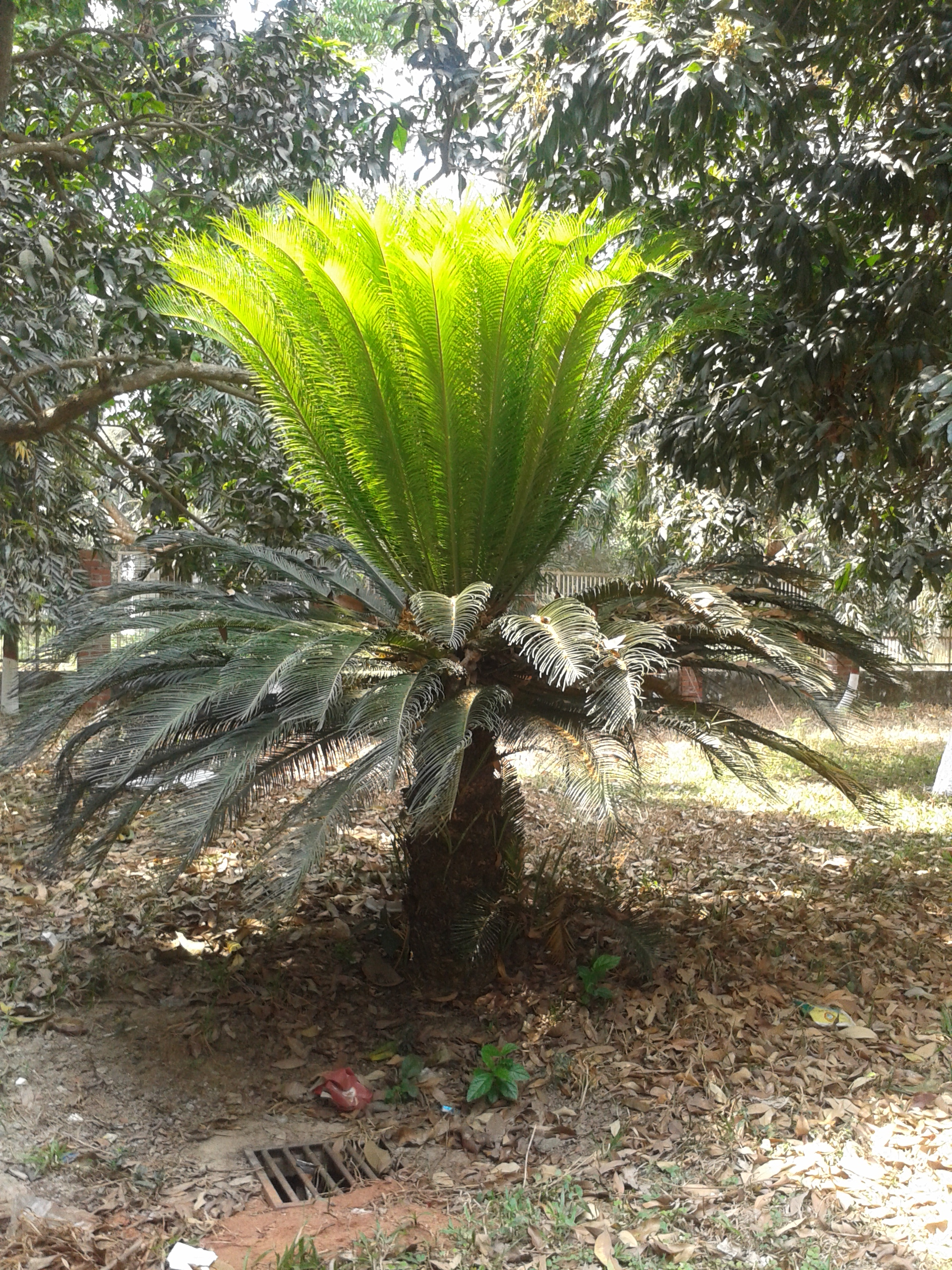
Cycas sp.

Cycas (and the Cycadaceae family) is considered as being an early offshoot that diverged early from all other living cycads (which belong to the family Zamiaceae). Estimates of the timing of the split ranging from the Jurassic to the Carboniferous. The earliest fossils assignable to Cycas are known from the Paleogene of East Asia, such as Cycas fushunensis from the Eocene (around 47.5 million years ago) of Northeast China with East Asia likely representing the ancestral homeland of the genus. The presence of Cycas in Australasia and eastern Africa is relatively new, but the major evolutionary events behind the genesis of new species have taken place in Indochina and Australia, where the majority of living species are native.

Fossil seeds from the Middle Jurassic of England and British Columbia were suggested in a 2017 study to be more closely related to Cycas than other cycads and were assigned to the same family, Cycadaceae. A later study suggested that these seeds could not be assigned to the stem-group of Cycas with confidence due to lacking the double vascular system that characterises the seeds of all living cycads. The leaf fossil genus Paracycas known from the Jurassic and Cretaceous of Europe has been suggested to be early representatives of the Cycas lineage by cladistic analysis.

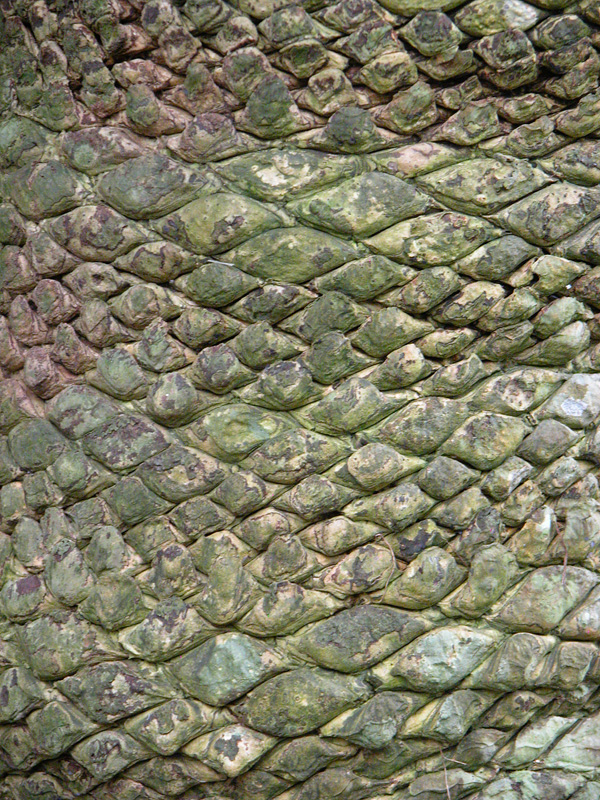
Bark of Cycas rumphii

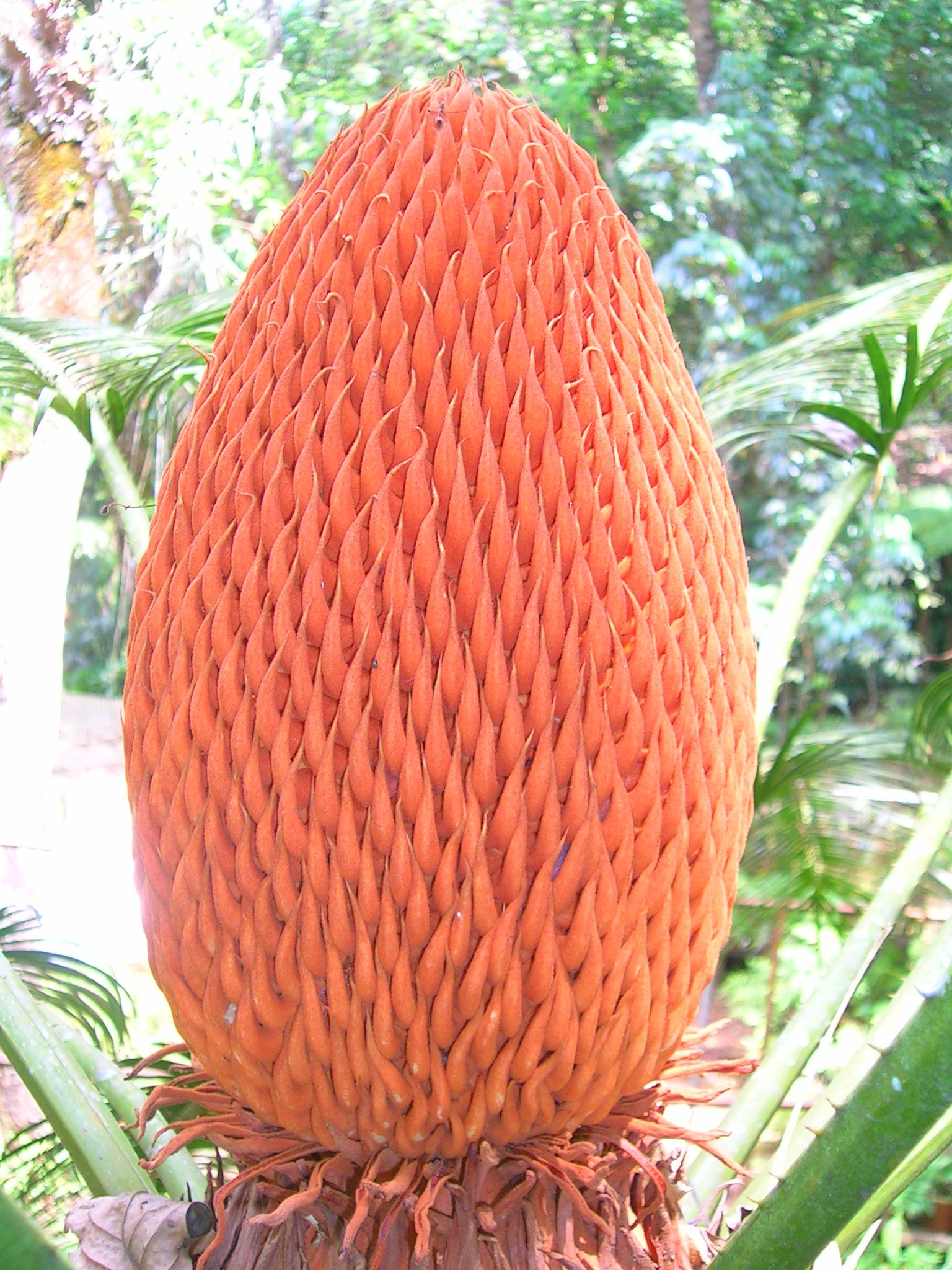
A male cone of Cycas circinalis

Cycas native to Odisha

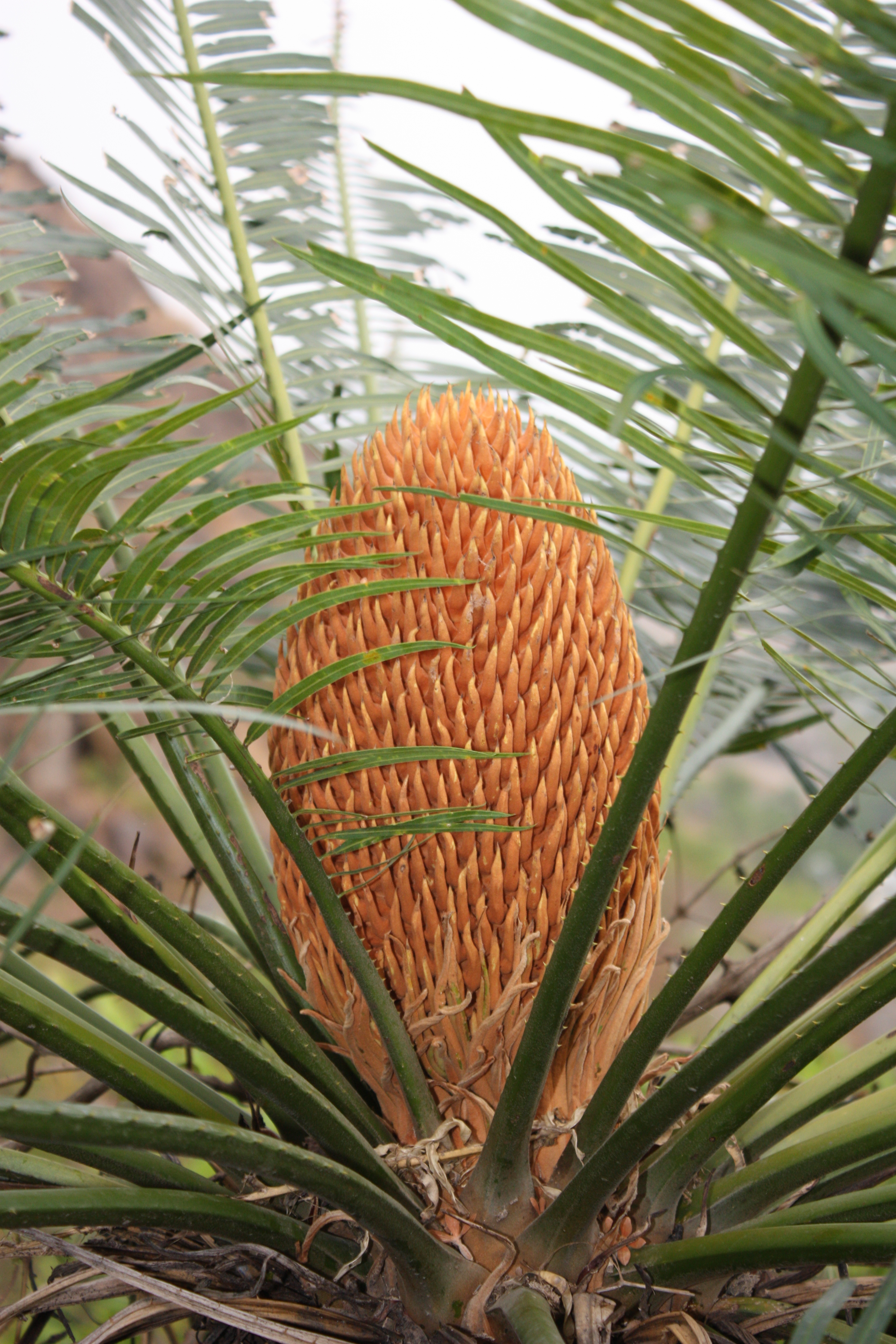
Cycas nayagarhensis male cone

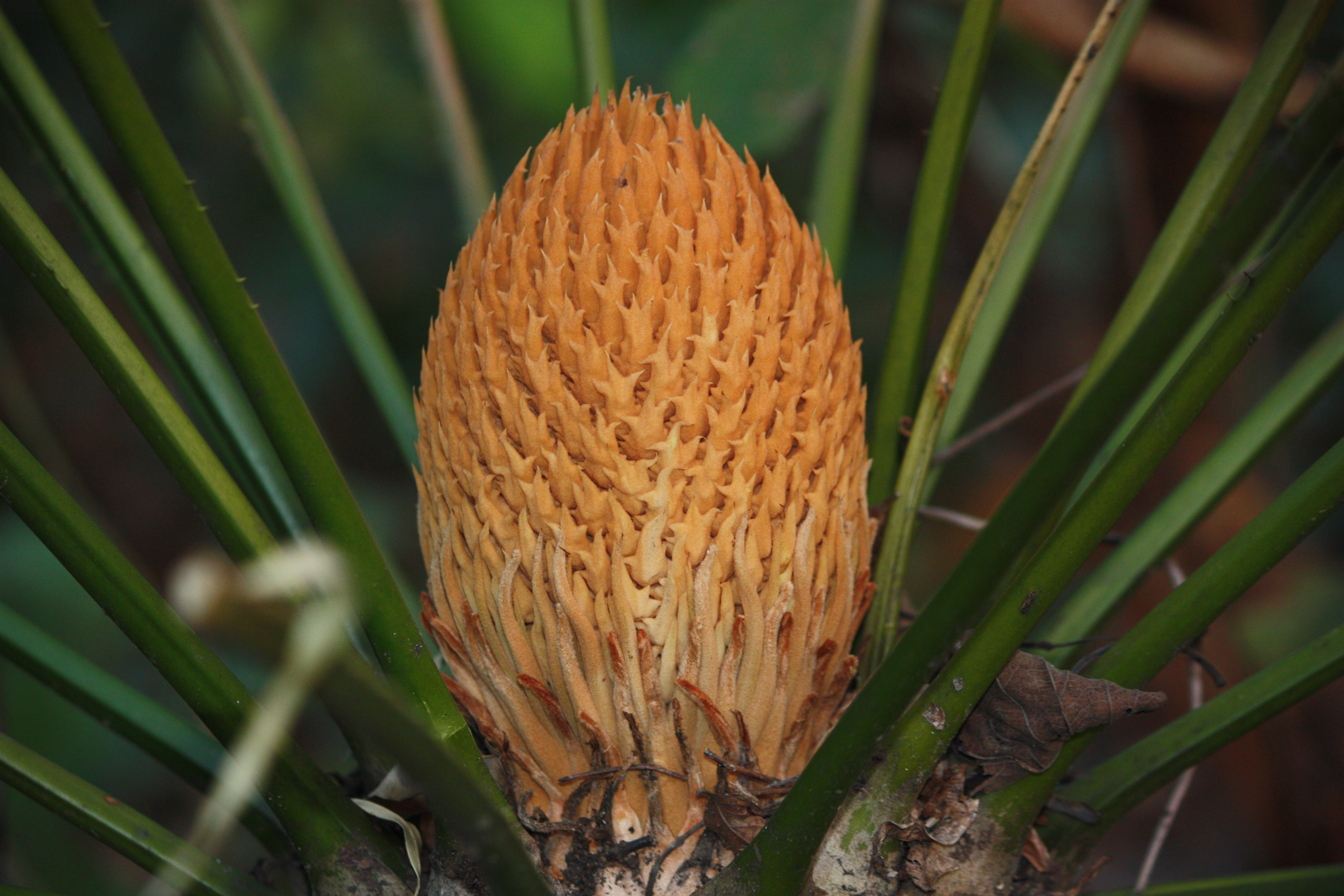
Cycas orixensis male cone

== Conservation status ==
Cycas species are threatened worldwide and almost all the species are listed in the IUCN Red List. Cycas beddomei is the only species of the genus Cycas listed in Appendix I of CITES. All other members of Cycadaceae are listed under Appendix II. Cycas rumphii and Cycas pectinata have the most widespread distribution.

== Phylogeny ==
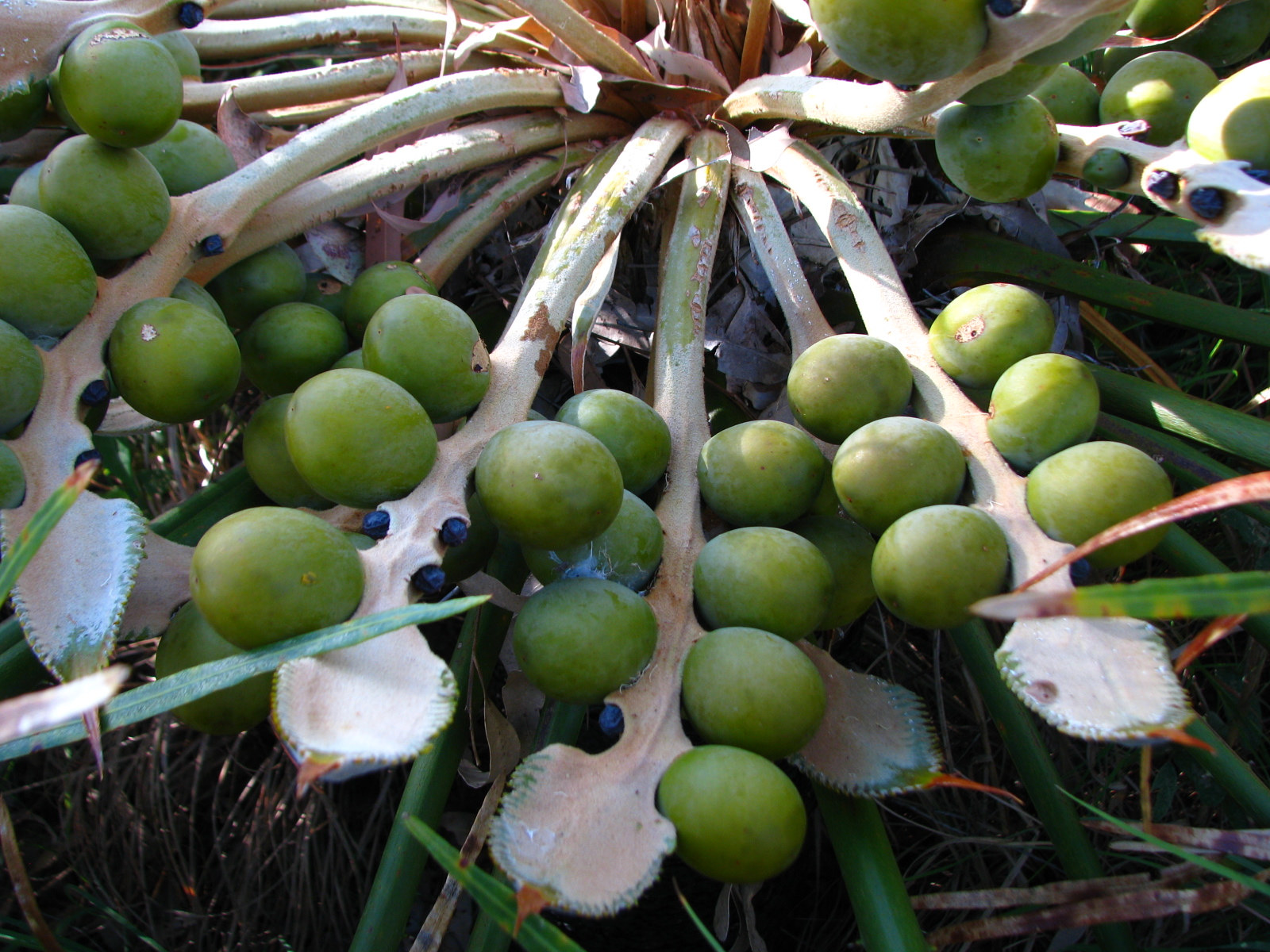
Cycas media megasporophylls with nearly-mature seeds on a wild plant in north Queensland, Australia

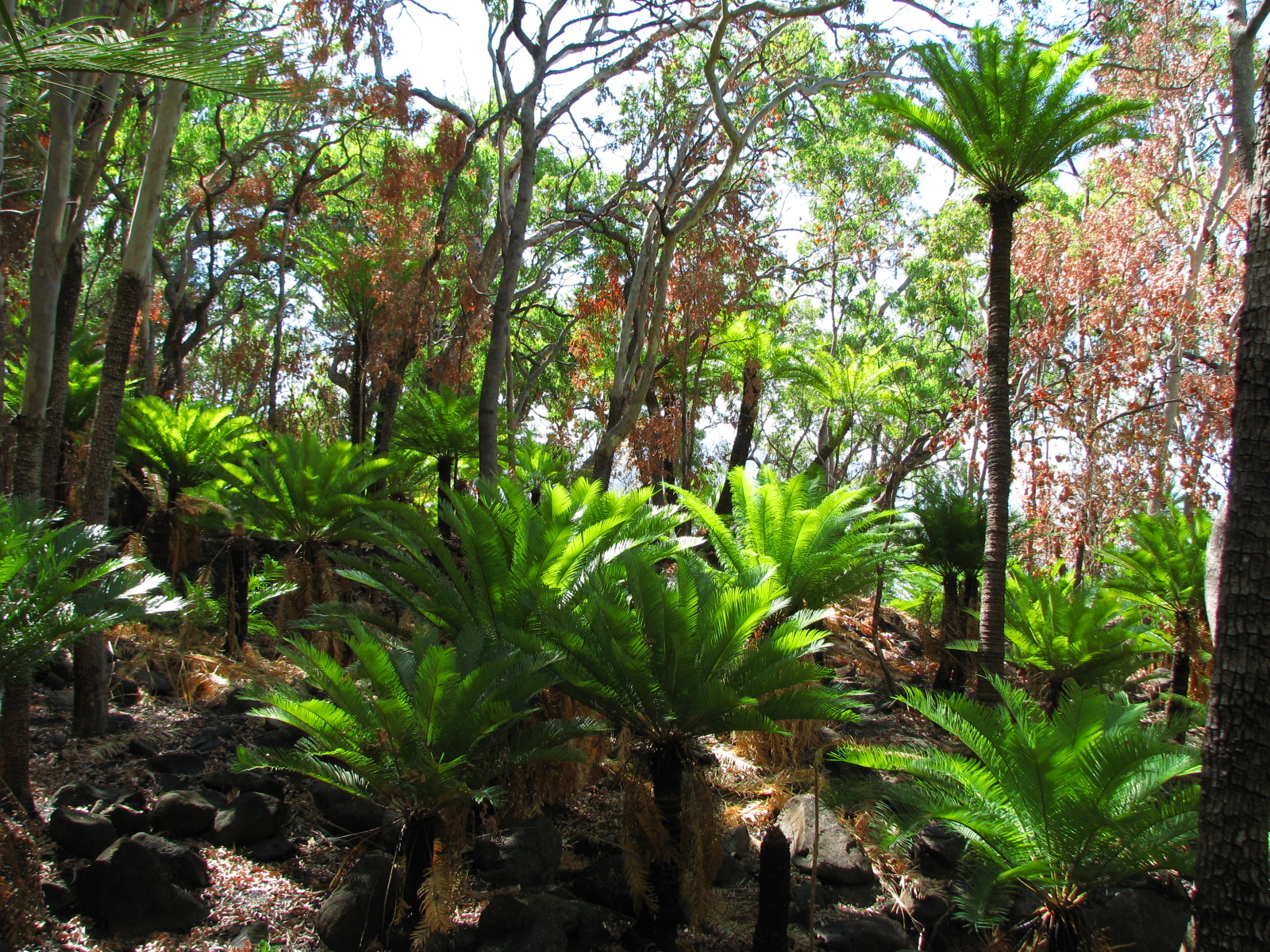
Grove of Cycas media in north Queensland

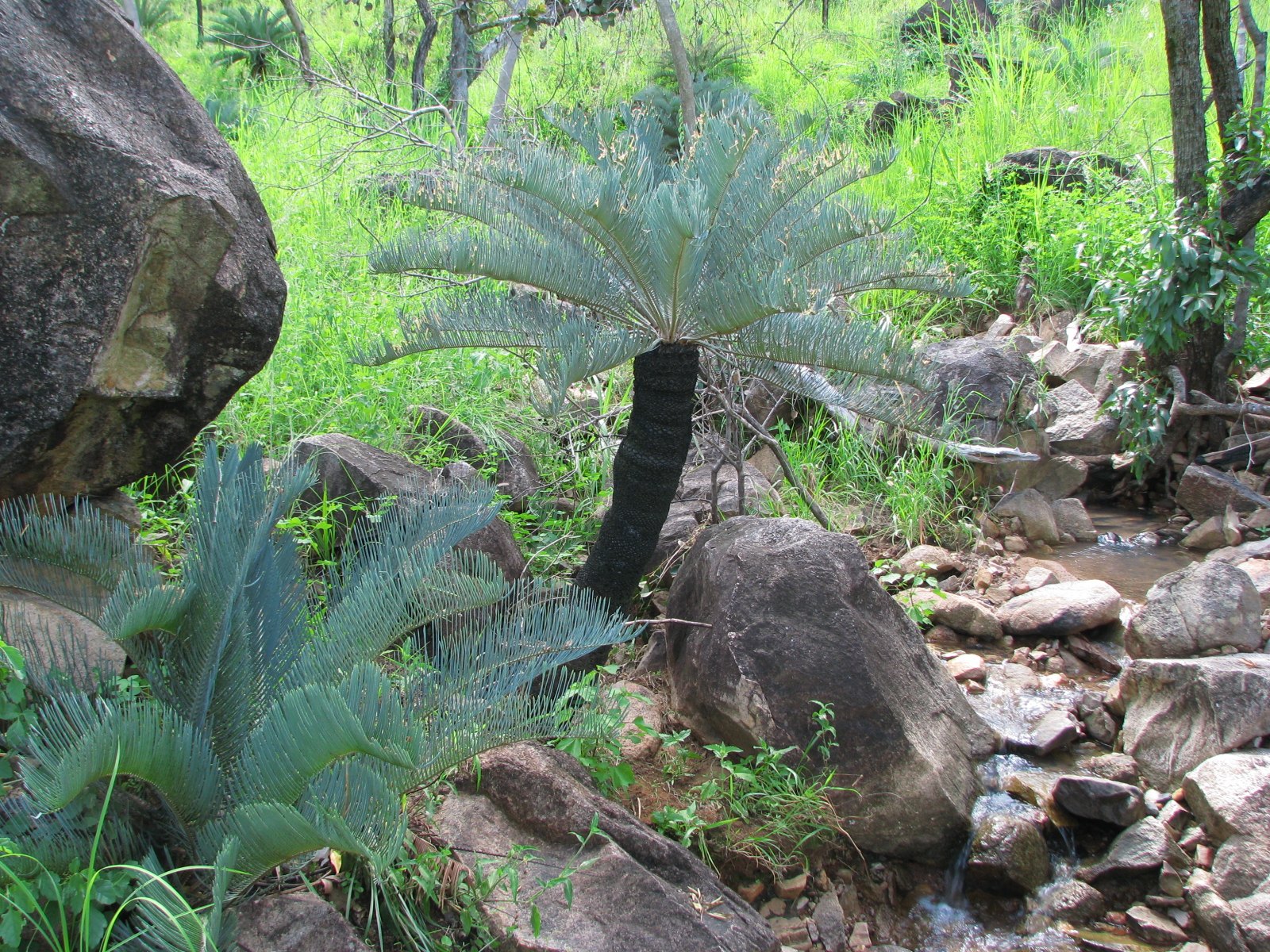
Cycas platyphylla in north Queensland with new flush of fronds during the rainy season, still with glaucous bloom

Phylogeny of Cycas

- - - section Stangerioides
      C. micholitzii Dyer
  - - - (Pectinata)
        - C. multipinnata C.J.Chen & S.Y.Yang
        - C. pectinata Buch.-Ham.
    - - C. thouarsii R.Br. ex Gaudichaud-Beaupré
      - - (Panzhihuaenses)
          - section Asiorientales
            - C. revoluta Thunb. (Sago palm)
            - C. taitungensis Shen et al.
          - section Panzhihuaenses
            - C. tropophylla K.D.Hill & P.K.Lôc
            - - C. ferruginea F.N.Wei
              - - C. curranii (J.Schust.) K.D.Hill
                - - C. debaoensis Y.C.Zhong & C.J.Chen
                  - - C. brachycantha K.D.Hill, H.T.Nguyen & P.K.Lôc
                    - C. immersa Craib
        - (Cycas)
          - C. bifida (Dyer) K.D.Hill
          - - C. szechuanensis W.C.Cheng & L.K.Fu
            - - - section Wadeanae
                  - subsection Wadeanae
                    C. wadei Merr.
                  - subsection Taiwanianosae
                    - C. hainanensis C.J.Chen
                    - - C. taiwaniana Carruthers
                      - C. fairylakea D.Y.Wang
              - - section Cycas
                  - subsection Cycas
                    - C. circinalis L. (Indu)
                    - C. micronesica K.D.Hill
                  - subsection Rumphiae
                    - C. pschannae R.C.Srivast. & L.J.Singh
                    - - C. edentata de Laub.
                      - - C. nitida K.D.Hill & A.Lindstr.
                        - C. rumphii Miq.
                - - section Indosinenses
                    - C. clivicola K.D.Hill
                    - - subsection Indosinenses
                        - C. siamensis Miq.
                        - - C. vespertilio A.Lindstr. & K.D.Hill
                          - - C. riuminiana M.Porte ex Regel
                            - - C. bougainvilleana K.D.Hill
                              - C. celebica Miq.
                      - subsection Lindstroemiae
                        - C. macrocarpa Griff.
                        - - C. nongnoochiae K.D.Hill
                          - - C. elongata (Leandri) D.Y.Wang
                            - - C. tansachana K.D.Hill & S.L.Yang
                              - - C. lindstromii S.L.Yang, K.D.Hill & Nguyên
                                - - C. condaoensis K.D.Hill & S.L.Yang
                                  - - C. chamaoensis K.D.Hill
                                    - C. media R.Br.
                  - section Endemicae
                    - C. diannanensis Z.T.Guan & G.D.Tao
                    - - C. cairnsiana F.Muell.
                      - - C. petrae A.Lindstr. & K.D.Hill
                        - - C. megacarpa K.D.Hill
                          - - C. calcicola Maconochie
                            - - C. armstrongii Miq.
                              - - C. balansae Warb.
                                - - C. segmentifida D.Y.Wang & C.Y.Deng
                                  - - C. dolichophylla K.D.Hill, H.T.Nguyen & P.K.Lôc
                                    - - C. simplicipinna (Smitinand) K.D.Hill
                                      - - C. guizhouensis K.M.Lan & R.F.Zou
                                        - - C. chevalieri Leandri
                                          - - C. maconochiei Chirgwin & K.D.Hill
                                            - - C. arenicola K.D.Hill
                                              - - - C. schumanniana Lauterb.
                                                  - - C. aculeata K.D.Hill & H.T.Nguyen
                                                    - C. silvestris K.D.Hill
                                                - - C. basaltica C.A.Gardner
                                                  - - C. semota K.D.Hill
                                                    - - C. orientis K.D.Hill
                                                      - - C. canalis K.D.Hill
                                                        - - C. hongheensis S.Y.Yang & S.L.Yang
                                                          - - C. conferta Chirgwin
                                                            - - C. angulata R.Br.
                                                              - - - C. couttsiana K.D.Hill
                                                                  - - C. ophiolitica K.D.Hill
                                                                    - - C. tanqingii D.Y.Wang
                                                                      - C. platyphylla K.D.Hill
                                                                - - C. indica A.Lindstr. & K.D.Hill (=Cycas swamyi)
                                                                  - - C. annaikalensis Rita Singh & P.Radha
                                                                    - - C. beddomei Dyer
                                                                      - C. sphaerica Roxb.

Other species:

- Cycas aenigma K.D.Hill & A.Lindstr.
- Cycas apoa K.D.Hill
- Cycas arnhemica K.D.Hill
- Cycas badensis K.D.Hill
- Cycas bglswamyi Pant ex Agrawal, Akhtar & R.C.Srivast.
- Cycas brunnea K.D.Hill
- Cycas campestris K.D.Hill
- Cycas candida K.D.Hill
- Cycas cantafolia Jutta, K.L.Chew & Saw
- Cycas changjiangensis N.Liu
- Cycas chenii X.Gong & Wei Zhou
- Cycas collina K.D.Hill, H.T.Nguyen & P.K.Lôc
- Cycas cupida P.I.Forst.
- Cycas darshii R.C.Srivast. & Jana
- Cycas desolata P.I.Forst.
- Cycas dharmrajii L.J.Singh
- Cycas distans P.I.Forst. & B.Gray
- Cycas divyadarshanii Khuraijam & Rita Singh
- Cycas elephantipes A.Lindstr. & K.D.Hill
- Cycas falcata K.D.Hill
- Cycas flabellata Agoo, Madulid & J.R.Callado
- Cycas fugax K.D.Hill, H.T.Nguyen & P.K.Lôc
- Cycas furfuracea W.Fitzg.
- Cycas glauca Miq.
- Cycas hoabinhensis Lôc & H.T.Nguyen
- Cycas inermis Oudem.
- Cycas javana (Miq.) de Laub.
- Cycas lacrimans A.Lindstr. & K.D.Hill
- Cycas lane-poolei C.A.Gardner
- Cycas laotica T.H.Nguyên & K.S.Nguyen
- Cycas litoralis K.D.Hill
- Cycas mindanaensis Agoo, Madulid & J.R.Callado
- Cycas miquelii Warb.
- Cycas montana A.Lindstr. & K.D.Hill
- Cycas nayagarhensis Rita Singh, P.Radha & Khuraijam
- Cycas nathorstii J.Schust.
- Cycas orixensis (Haines) Rita Singh & Khuraijam
- Cycas pachypoda K.D.Hill
- Cycas panzhihuaensis Zhou & S.Y.Yang
- Cycas papuana F.Muell.
- Cycas pectinata
- Cycas pranburiensis S.L.Yang et al.
- Cycas pruinosa Maconochie
- Cycas sainathii R.C.Srivast.
- Cycas sancti-lasallei Agoo & Madulid
- Cycas saxatilis K.D.Hill & A.Lindstr.
- Cycas scratchleyana F.Muell.
- Cycas seemannii A.Braun
- Cycas seshachalamensis P.V.C.Rao et al.
- Cycas sexseminifera F.N.Wei
- Cycas shanyaensis Fu
- Cycas sundaica Miq. ex A.Lindstr. & K.D.Hill
- Cycas terryana P.I.Forst.
- Cycas tuckeri K.D.Hill
- Cycas xipholepis K.D.Hill
- Cycas yorkiana K.D.Hill
- Cycas yunnanensis Cheng, Fu & Cheng
- Cycas zambalensis Madulid & Agoo
- Cycas zeylanica (J.Schust.) A.Lindstr. & K.D.Hill
