= Cycas fugax =

Conservation status
- Critically Endangered (IUCN 3.1)

Scientific classification
- Kingdom: Plantae
- Clade: Tracheophytes
- Clade: Gymnospermae
- Division: Cycadophyta
- Class: Cycadopsida
- Order: Cycadales
- Family: Cycadaceae
- Genus: Cycas
- Species: C. fugax

Binomial name
- Cycas fugax K.D.Hill, T.H.Nguyên & P.K.Lôc

Species of cycad

Cycas fugax is a species of cycad which is endemic to Vietnam. It has only been recorded in the wild from Phu Tho Province and Hanoi. It is also commonly cultivated in Hanoi.
