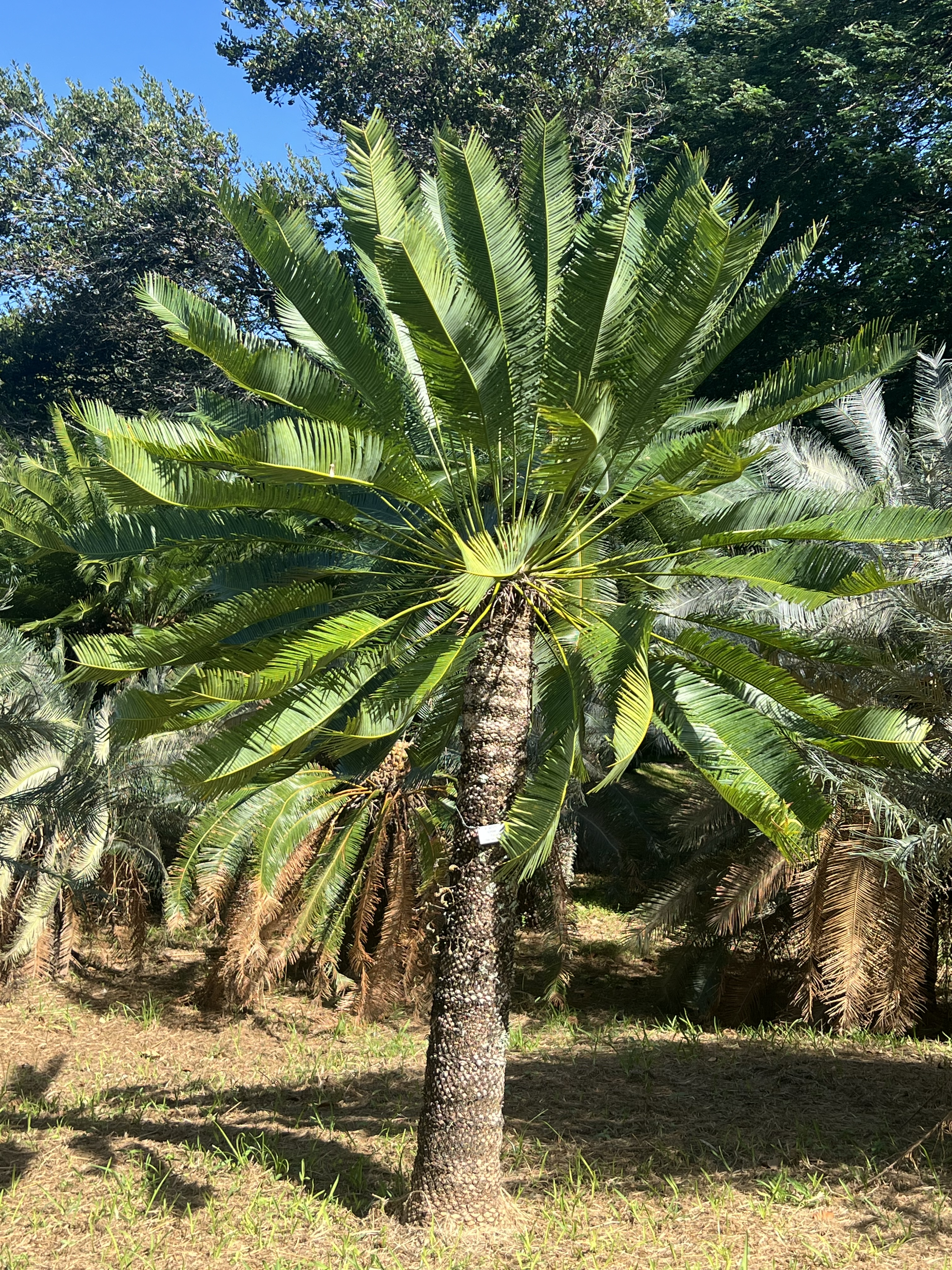

Conservation status
- Near Threatened (IUCN 3.1)

Scientific classification
- Kingdom: Plantae
- Clade: Tracheophytes
- Clade: Gymnosperms
- Division: Cycadophyta
- Class: Cycadopsida
- Order: Cycadales
- Family: Cycadaceae
- Genus: Cycas
- Species: C. conferta

Binomial name
- Cycas conferta Chirgwin

= Cycas conferta =

Species of cycad

Cycas conferta is a species of cycad. It is native to rocky areas of the Northern Territory in Australia, including Kakadu National Park.
