= Cycas sundaica =

Scientific classification
- Kingdom: Plantae
- Clade: Tracheophytes
- Clade: Gymnospermae
- Division: Cycadophyta
- Class: Cycadopsida
- Order: Cycadales
- Family: Cycadaceae
- Genus: Cycas
- Species: C. sundaica

Binomial name
- Cycas sundaica Miq. ex A.Lindstr. & K.D.Hill

Species of cycad

Cycas sundaica is a species of cycad endemic to the Lesser Sunda Islands of Indonesia. It is found on the islands of Sumbawa, Komodo, Rinca, Flores, and Alor.
