= Cycas changjiangensis =

Conservation status
- Endangered (IUCN 3.1)

Scientific classification
- Kingdom: Plantae
- Clade: Tracheophytes
- Clade: Gymnospermae
- Division: Cycadophyta
- Class: Cycadopsida
- Order: Cycadales
- Family: Cycadaceae
- Genus: Cycas
- Species: C. changjiangensis

Binomial name
- Cycas changjiangensis N.Liu

Synonyms
- Cycas hainanensis subsp. changjiangensis (N.Liu) N.Liu

Species of cycad

Cycas changjiangensis is a plant species in the cycad order, Cycadales. It is endemic to Hainan Island of southern China. It grows at elevations of 600–800 metres (2,000–2,600 ft). It is found only in a small area in Bawangling 霸王岭国家森林公园, Changjiang County, western Hainan Province, China.

Cycas changjiangensis has a trunk up to 50 cm (20 in) long but much of this is often subterranean. Leaves are pinnate, up to 130 cm (51 in) long, with spines along the rachis. Leaflets are in 40–70 pairs, with prominent midveins on both surfaces. The green to yellow-brown seeds are less than 2 cm (0.79 in) wide.

This is an endangered species with perhaps 2000 individuals remaining in the wild.
