= Cycas pruinosa =

Conservation status
- Least Concern (IUCN 3.1)

Scientific classification
- Kingdom: Plantae
- Clade: Tracheophytes
- Clade: Gymnospermae
- Division: Cycadophyta
- Class: Cycadopsida
- Order: Cycadales
- Family: Cycadaceae
- Genus: Cycas
- Species: C. pruinosa

Binomial name
- Cycas pruinosa Maconochie

Species of cycad

Cycas pruinosa is a small to medium species of cycad, a palm-like seed plant. It is a widespread but sporadic species in the eastern and southern Kimberley region of Western Australia, occurring also in the Spirit Hills on Bullo River Station in the Northern Territory.

== Features ==
This species is distinguished by its narrow, glabrous leaflets with strongly recurved margins; its long, slender microsporangiate cones; and its long megasporophylls with long, sterile apices. It has a stout, erect trunk, around 2.5 m (8.2 ft) tall and 30 cm (12 in) in diameter, which is crowned with arching fronds, distinctly curved from the apex and V-shaped in cross-section. Glaucous leaf waxes may be either present or absent, causing plants to be either blue or green in overall appearance. It is suited to tropical regions which have a seasonally dry climate.

== History ==
This strikingly distinctive and widespread species was only first recognised in 1978 by Australian botanist John Maconochie. The specific name, pruinosa, means "covered with powder" and aptly describes the blue-white ovules of this plant.
