= Cycas furfuracea =

Conservation status
- Near Threatened (IUCN 3.1)

Scientific classification
- Kingdom: Plantae
- Clade: Tracheophytes
- Clade: Gymnospermae
- Division: Cycadophyta
- Class: Cycadopsida
- Order: Cycadales
- Family: Cycadaceae
- Genus: Cycas
- Species: C. furfuracea

Binomial name
- Cycas furfuracea W.Fitzg.

Species of cycad

Cycas furfuracea is a species of cycad, endemic to northeastern Western Australia.

== Range ==
In Australia, Cycas furfuracea is found in:

- Bold Bluff, Mount Broome.
- Mount Herbert in the Wunaamin-Miliwundi Ranges.
- Kimbolton area.
