= Cycas cupida =

Conservation status
- Near Threatened (IUCN 3.1)

Scientific classification
- Kingdom: Plantae
- Clade: Embryophytes
- Clade: Tracheophytes
- Clade: Spermatophytes
- Clade: Gymnospermae
- Division: Cycadophyta
- Class: Cycadopsida
- Order: Cycadales
- Family: Cycadaceae
- Genus: Cycas
- Species: C. cupida

Binomial name
- Cycas cupida P.I.Forst.

Species of cycad

Cycas cupida is a species of cycad native to Queensland, Australia.
