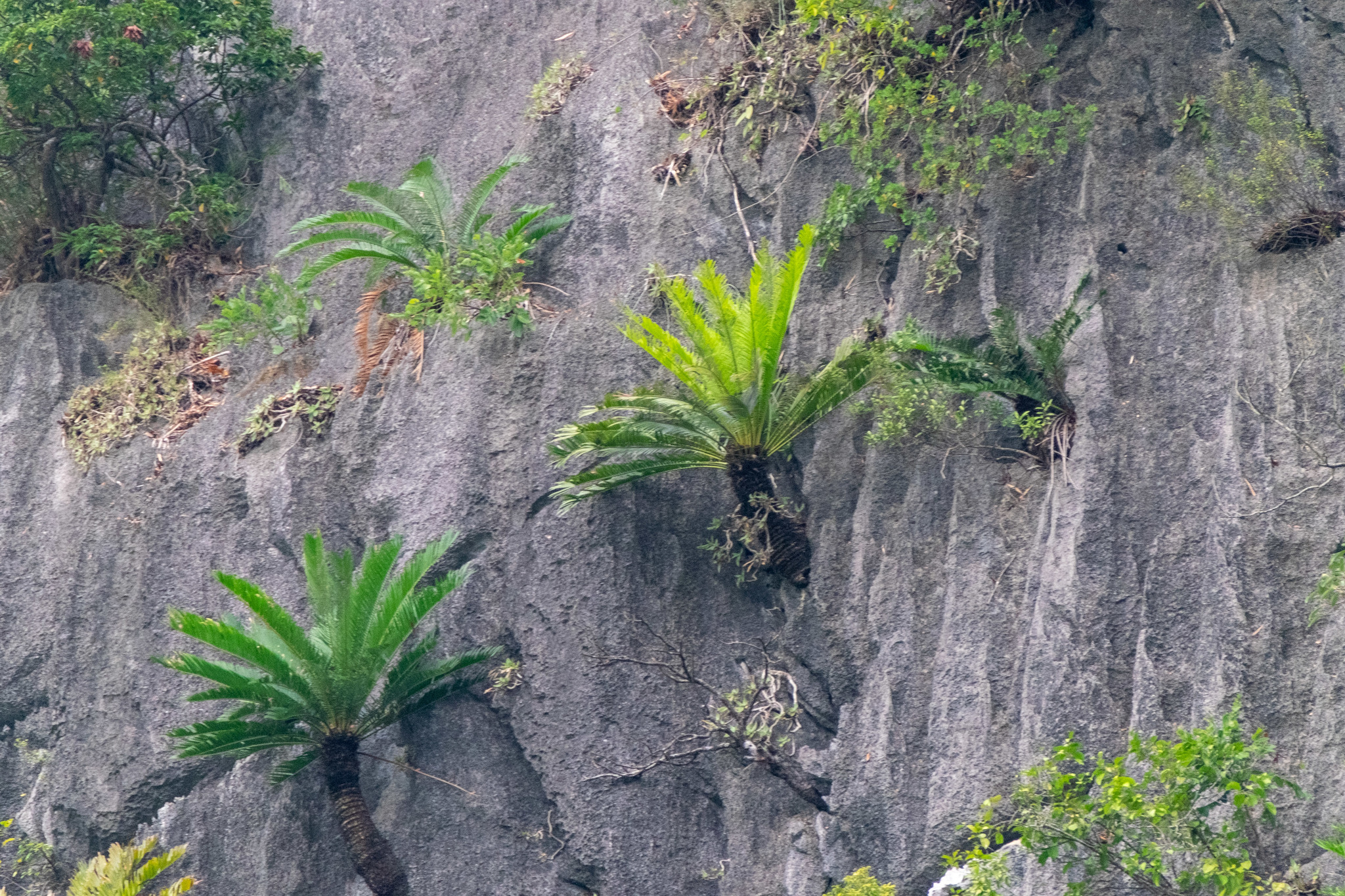

Conservation status
- Near Threatened (IUCN 3.1)

Scientific classification
- Kingdom: Plantae
- Clade: Tracheophytes
- Clade: Gymnospermae
- Division: Cycadophyta
- Class: Cycadopsida
- Order: Cycadales
- Family: Cycadaceae
- Genus: Cycas
- Species: C. tropophylla

Binomial name
- Cycas tropophylla K.D.Hill & P.K.Lôc

= Cycas tropophylla =

Species of cycad

Cycas tropophylla, the Ha Long cycad, is a species of cycad endemic to Vietnam.

It is found in Cát Bà National Park, Cát Hải District, Hải Phòng Province, Vietnam, as well as neighboring islands and on nearby limestone cliffs on the mainland.
