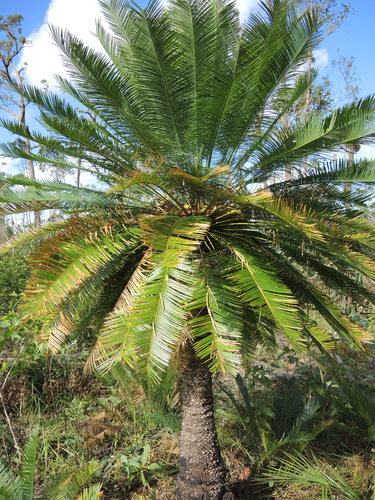

Conservation status
- Least Concern (IUCN 3.1)

Scientific classification
- Kingdom: Plantae
- Clade: Tracheophytes
- Clade: Gymnospermae
- Division: Cycadophyta
- Class: Cycadopsida
- Order: Cycadales
- Family: Cycadaceae
- Genus: Cycas
- Species: C. orientis

Binomial name
- Cycas orientis K.D.Hill

= Cycas orientis =

Species of cycad

Cycas orientis is a species of cycad native to East Arnhem Land in Australia's Northern Territory. The species name "orientis" is derived from Latin and refers to the eastern distribution of the species in Arnhem Land.

== Description ==
Cycas orientis is a species of cycad native to dry, open forests. It is a medium to large cycad, reaching heights of up to 7 m (23 ft). Its bright green, glossy leaves can grow up to 1.25 m (4 ft) in length. This species is well-adapted to the unique monsoonal climate of the region, which is characterized by the hot and wet, and the hot and dry seasons.

== Relationship with humans ==
Cycas orientis nuts (nyathu) are eaten by the Yolngu in Australia's Arnhem Land. They are harvested during the dry season and soaked in water overnight before being ground into a paste, wrapped under bark, and cooked on an open fire.
