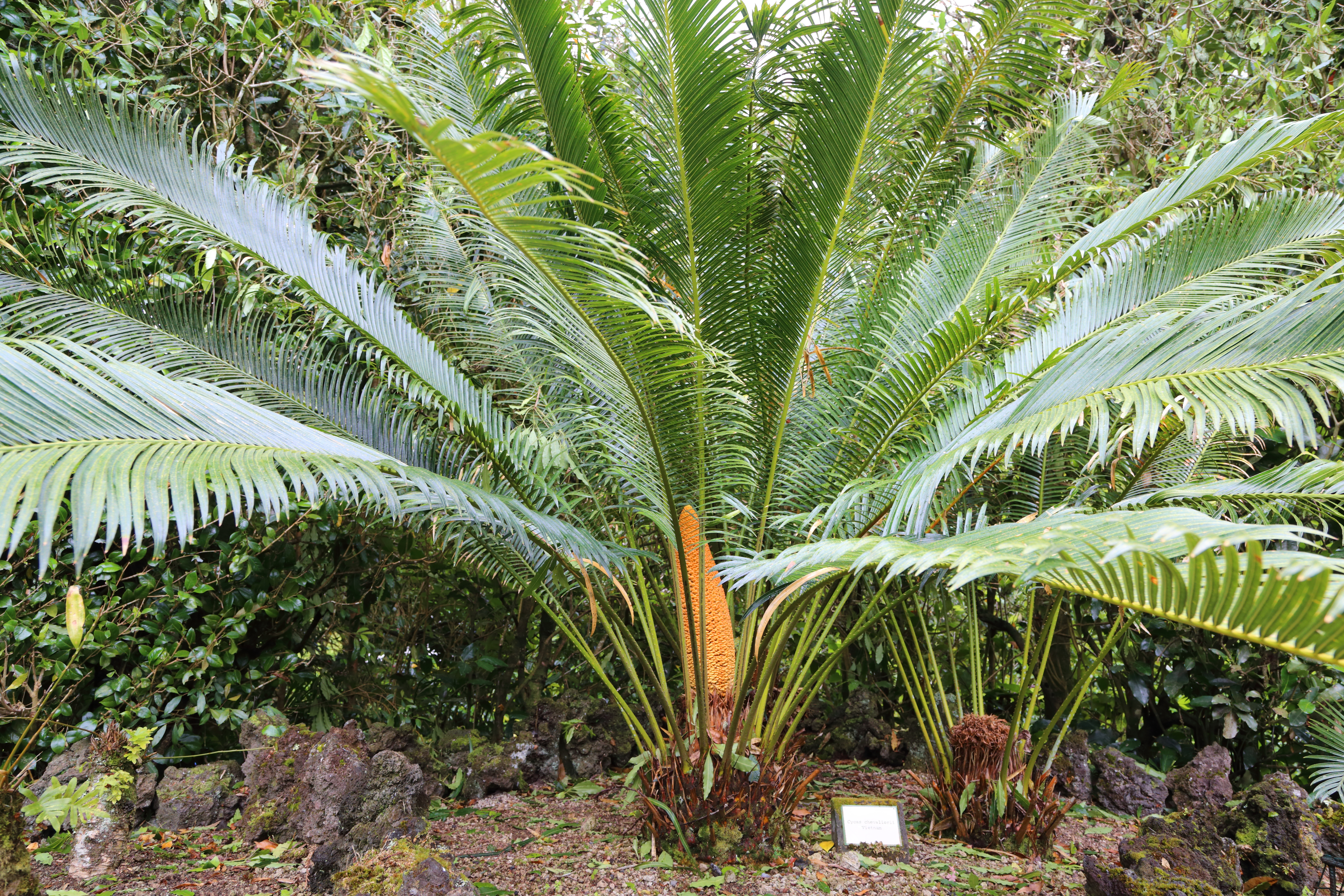

Conservation status
- Vulnerable (IUCN 3.1)

Scientific classification
- Kingdom: Plantae
- Clade: Tracheophytes
- Clade: Gymnospermae
- Division: Cycadophyta
- Class: Cycadopsida
- Order: Cycadales
- Family: Cycadaceae
- Genus: Cycas
- Species: C. chevalieri

Binomial name
- Cycas chevalieri Leandri

= Cycas chevalieri =

Species of cycad

Cycas chevalieri is a species of cycad in the family Cycadaceae. It is native to central Vietnam, including in Nghe An Province. It may also occur in Laos.
