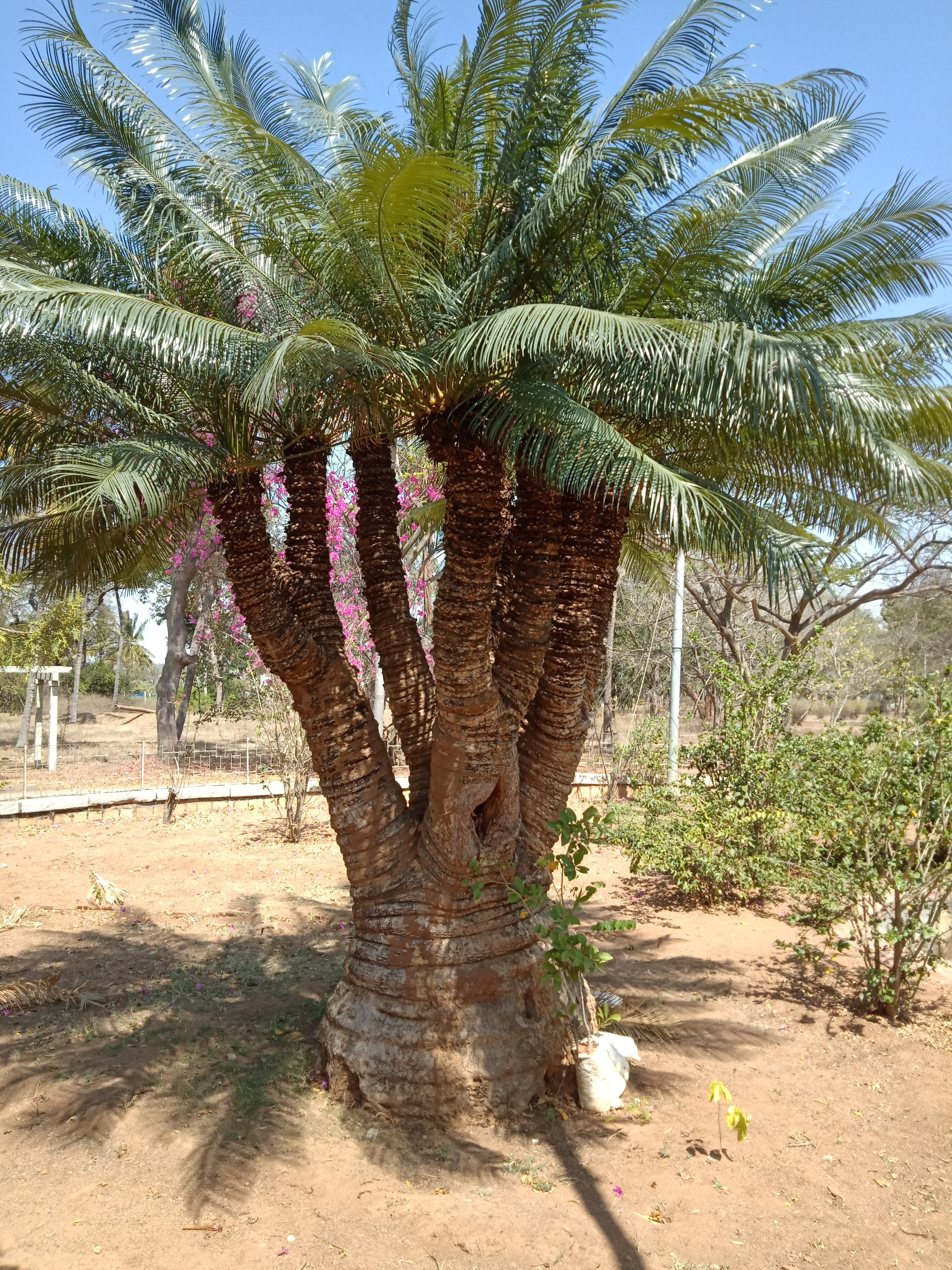
- Cycas indica, Bethamangala, Kolar, India

Scientific classification
- Kingdom: Plantae
- Clade: Tracheophytes
- Clade: Gymnospermae
- Division: Cycadophyta
- Class: Cycadopsida
- Order: Cycadales
- Family: Cycadaceae
- Genus: Cycas
- Species: C. indica

Binomial name
- Cycas indica A.Lindstr. & K.D.Hill

Synonyms
- Cycas swamyi Rita Singh & P. Radha

= Cycas indica =

Species of cycad

Cycas indica is a species of cycad endemic to India. The species grows in the dry plains of Karnataka and is known for its branching habit. A species Cycas swamyi also considered as a variety of Cycas circinalis is considered as a synonym of this species.
