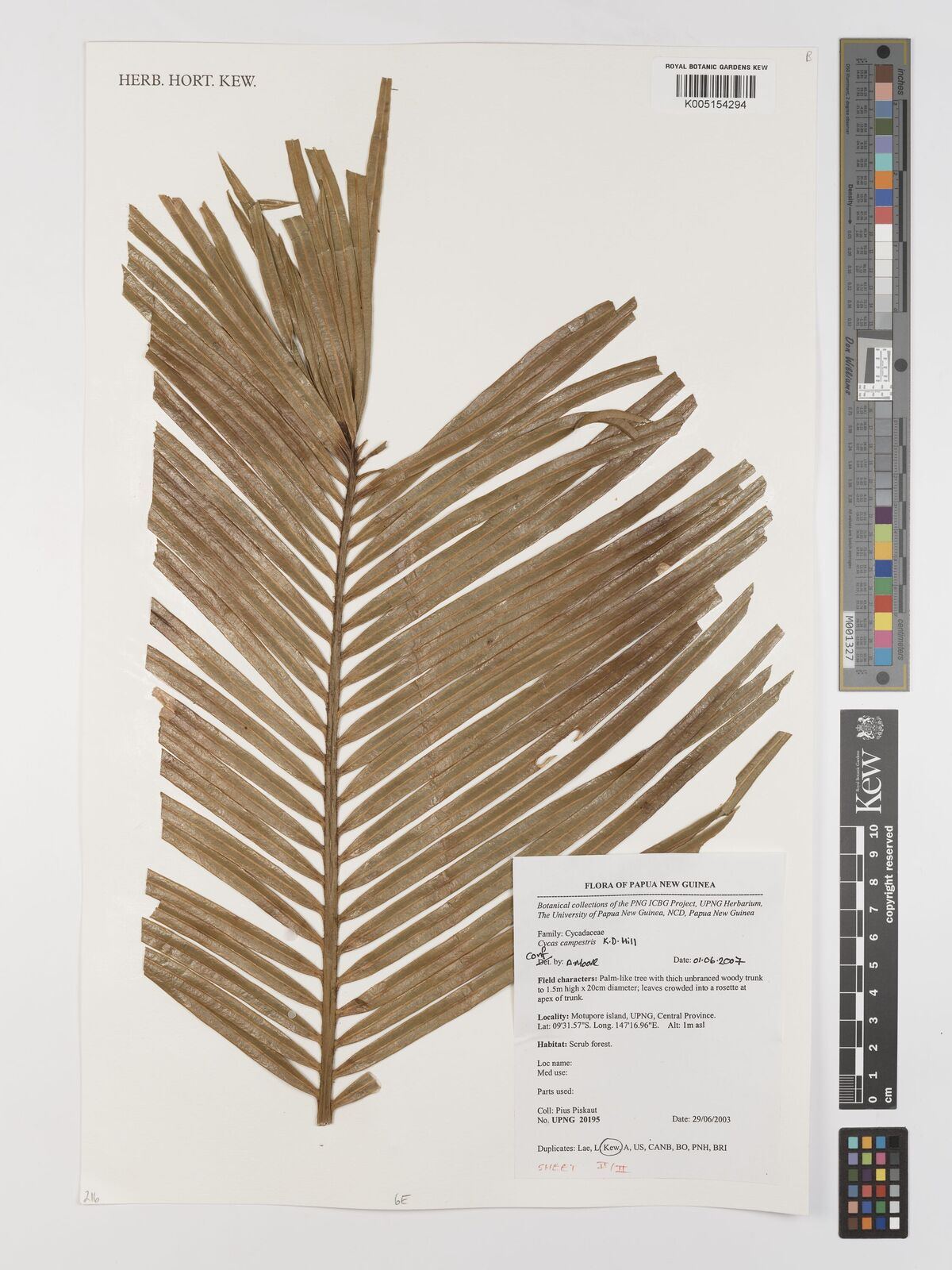

Conservation status
- Near Threatened (IUCN 3.1)

Scientific classification
- Kingdom: Plantae
- Clade: Tracheophytes
- Clade: Gymnospermae
- Division: Cycadophyta
- Class: Cycadopsida
- Order: Cycadales
- Family: Cycadaceae
- Genus: Cycas
- Species: C. campestris

Binomial name
- Cycas campestris K.D.Hill

= Cycas campestris =

Species of cycad

Cycas campestris is a species of cycad in the genus Cycas, native to southeastern Papua New Guinea in the lowland region near Port Moresby. It grows in open, grassy locations, often in areas with frequent grass fires.

The stems are erect, up to 2.5 m tall and 20 cm diameter. The leaves are orange tomentose on emerging, soon becoming bright glossy green and glabrous, 80–170 cm long, pinnate, with 120-230 leaflets. The leaflets are 8.5–16 cm long and 5–8 mm wide, and lie flat or in a shallow 'v'-shape on either side of the leaf stem. The leaf petioles are 15–90 cm long, and armed with sharp spines at the base.

The female cones are open, with sporophylls 13–25 cm long, with two to six ovules per sporophyll. The lamina is lanceolate, with spined dentate margins and an apical spine. The sarcotesta is 2–3.5 mm thick and orange, the sclerotesta flattened and long ovoid, with a network of shallow grooves. The male cones are solitary, narrow ovoid, 13–17 cm long and 7–9 cm diameter, brown, the sporophylls 33–40 mm long with an apical spine.
