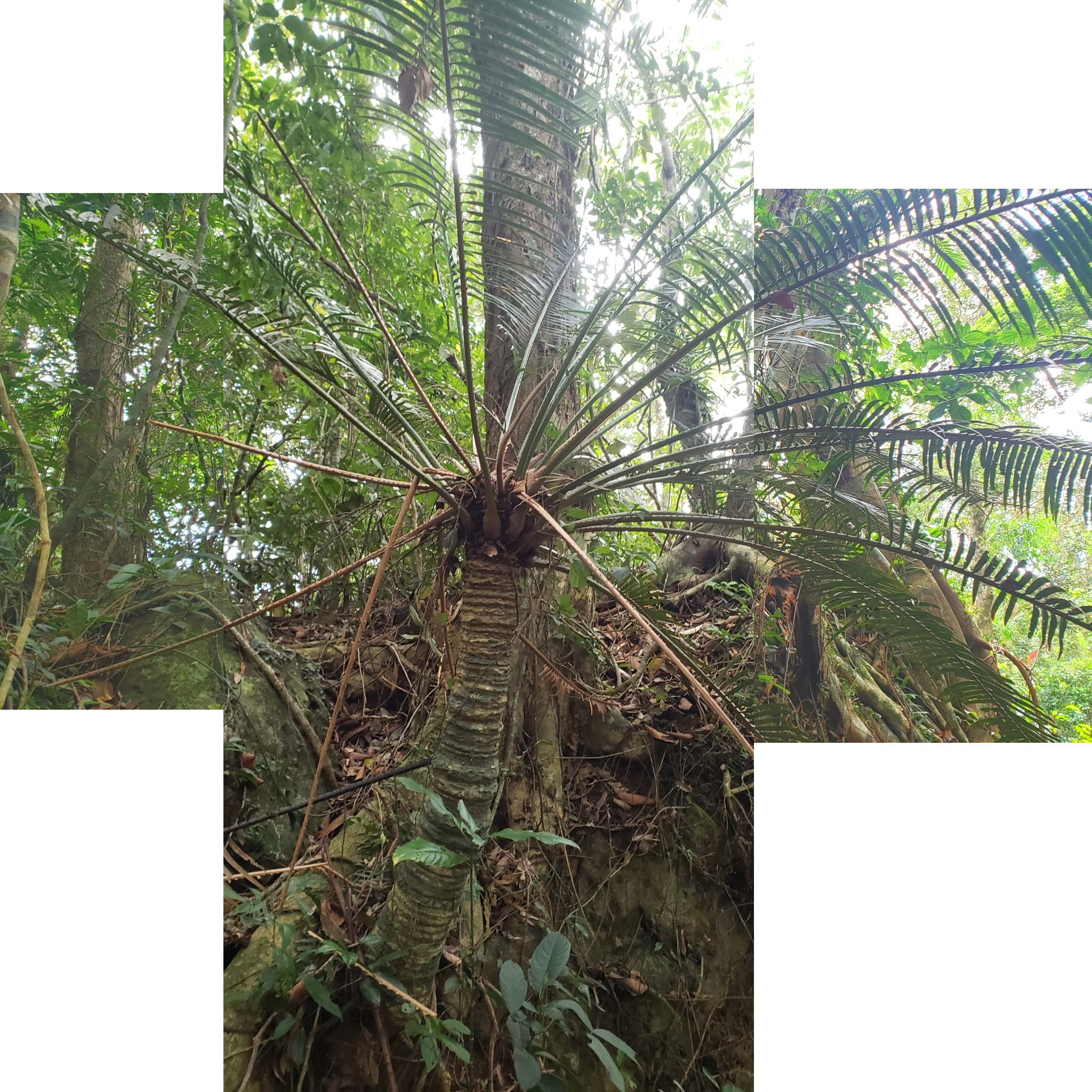
- Wild Cycas hainanensis

Conservation status
- Endangered (IUCN 3.1)

Scientific classification
- Kingdom: Plantae
- Clade: Tracheophytes
- Clade: Gymnospermae
- Division: Cycadophyta
- Class: Cycadopsida
- Order: Cycadales
- Family: Cycadaceae
- Genus: Cycas
- Species: C. hainanensis

Binomial name
- Cycas hainanensis C.J.Chen ex C.Y.Cheng, W.C.Cheng & L.K.Fu

= Cycas hainanensis =

Species of cycad

Cycas hainanensis is a species of cycad in Hainan, China. It is protected in some forest reserves and in Tongguling National Nature Reserve (铜鼓岭国家级自然保护区), Wenchang County. In Hainan, it is also found in Wanning and Haikou districts.

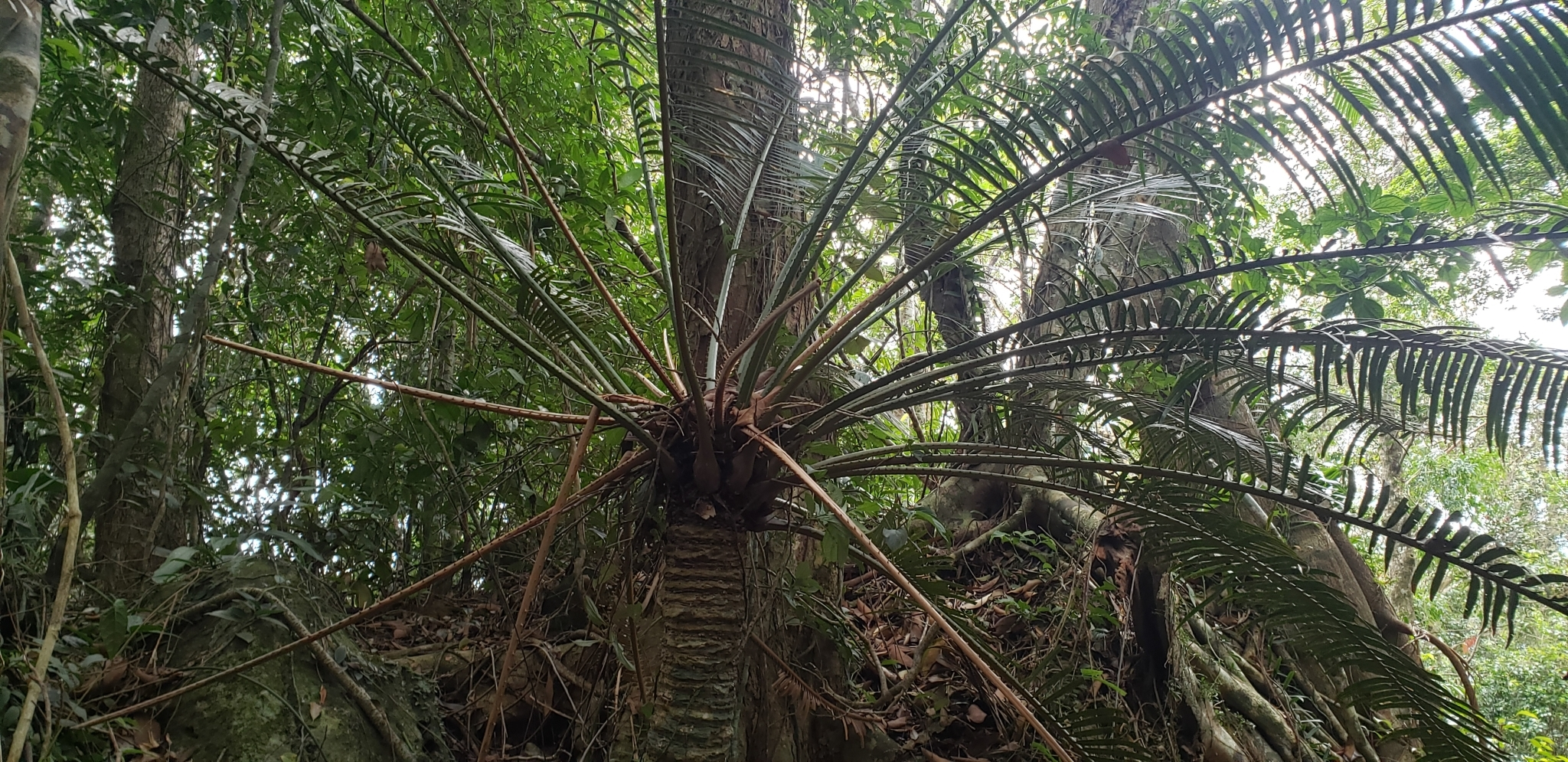
Wild Cycas hainanensis foliage
