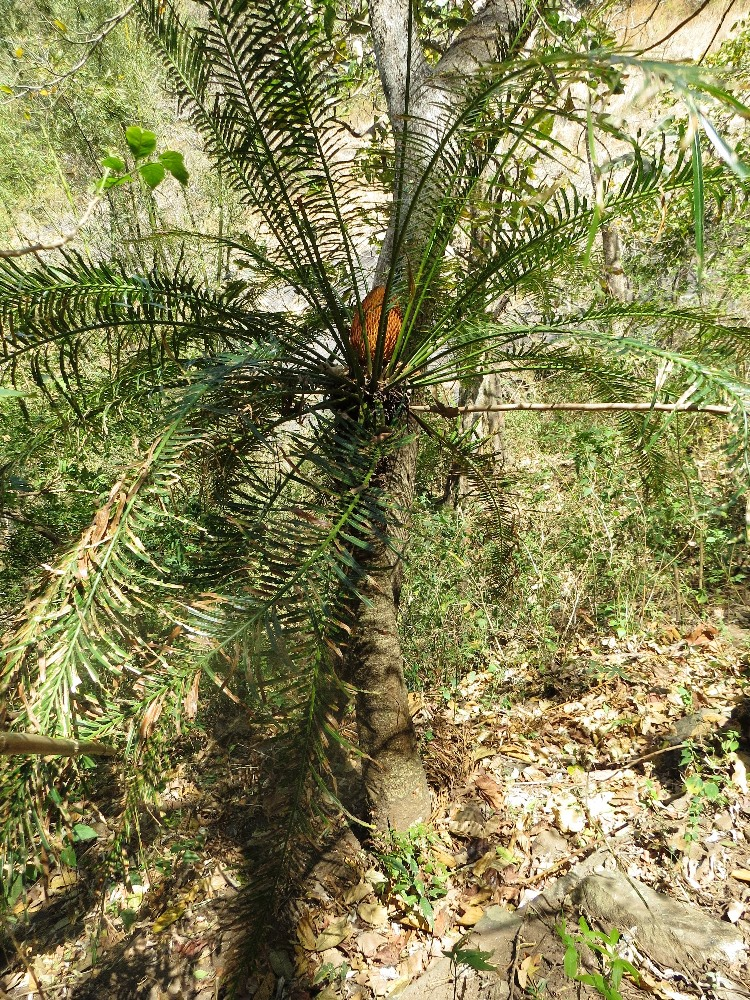
- Cycas annaikalenis in Palakkad

Conservation status
- Critically Endangered (IUCN 3.1)

Scientific classification
- Kingdom: Plantae
- Clade: Tracheophytes
- Clade: Gymnospermae
- Division: Cycadophyta
- Class: Cycadopsida
- Order: Cycadales
- Family: Cycadaceae
- Genus: Cycas
- Species: C. annaikalensis

Binomial name
- Cycas annaikalensis Rita Singh & P.Radha

= Cycas annaikalensis =

Species of cycad

Cycas annaikalensis is a Critically Endangered species of cycad in the genus Cycas, native to the state of Kerala in India, where it is endemic to the Annaikal Hills near Palakkad. It was discovered in 2006. There are less than 100 individuals remaining.
