= Cycas calcicola =

Conservation status
- Vulnerable (IUCN 3.1)
- CITES Appendix II

Scientific classification
- Kingdom: Plantae
- Clade: Tracheophytes
- Clade: Gymnospermae
- Division: Cycadophyta
- Class: Cycadopsida
- Order: Cycadales
- Family: Cycadaceae
- Genus: Cycas
- Species: C. calcicola

Binomial name
- Cycas calcicola Maconochie

Species of cycad

Cycas calcicola is a species of cycad in the genus Cycas, native to northern Australia in the northwest of Northern Territory.

The stems are erect, 2–5 m tall and 16–22 cm diameter. The leaves are variably deep green and glabrous to white tomentose above, and persistently white tomentose below, 60–130 cm long, pinnate, with 210-410 leaflets. The leaflets are 5–12 cm long and 2–4 mm wide, and lie flat either side of the leaf stem (not in a 'v'-shape like most other Cycas species). The petioles are 18–30 cm long, and armed with sharp spines at the base.

The female cones are open, with sporophylls 12–18 cm long, with four to six ovules per sporophyll. The lamina is lanceolate, with spined dentate margins and an apical spine. The sarcotesta is orange-brown, the sclerotesta short ovoid to globular, with a network of shallow grooves. The male cones are solitary, narrow ovoid, 25–30 cm long and 5–7 cm diameter, brown, the sporophylls 25–30 mm long with an upturned apical spine.

== Habitat ==
This cycad grows in a hot, dry, climate, often in association with Eucalyptus and Livistona. It was first found on limestone soil, from which the name calcicola "lime-dwelling" derives, but is not confined to limestone, also occurring on soils derived from sandstone and schist.
