= Cycas saxatilis =

Conservation status
- Vulnerable (IUCN 3.1)

Scientific classification
- Kingdom: Plantae
- Clade: Tracheophytes
- Clade: Gymnospermae
- Division: Cycadophyta
- Class: Cycadopsida
- Order: Cycadales
- Family: Cycadaceae
- Genus: Cycas
- Species: C. saxatilis

Binomial name
- Cycas saxatilis K.D.Hill & A.Lindstr.

Species of cycad

Cycas saxatilis is a species of cycad found only on Saint Paul's Mountain in Palawan at Philippines.
