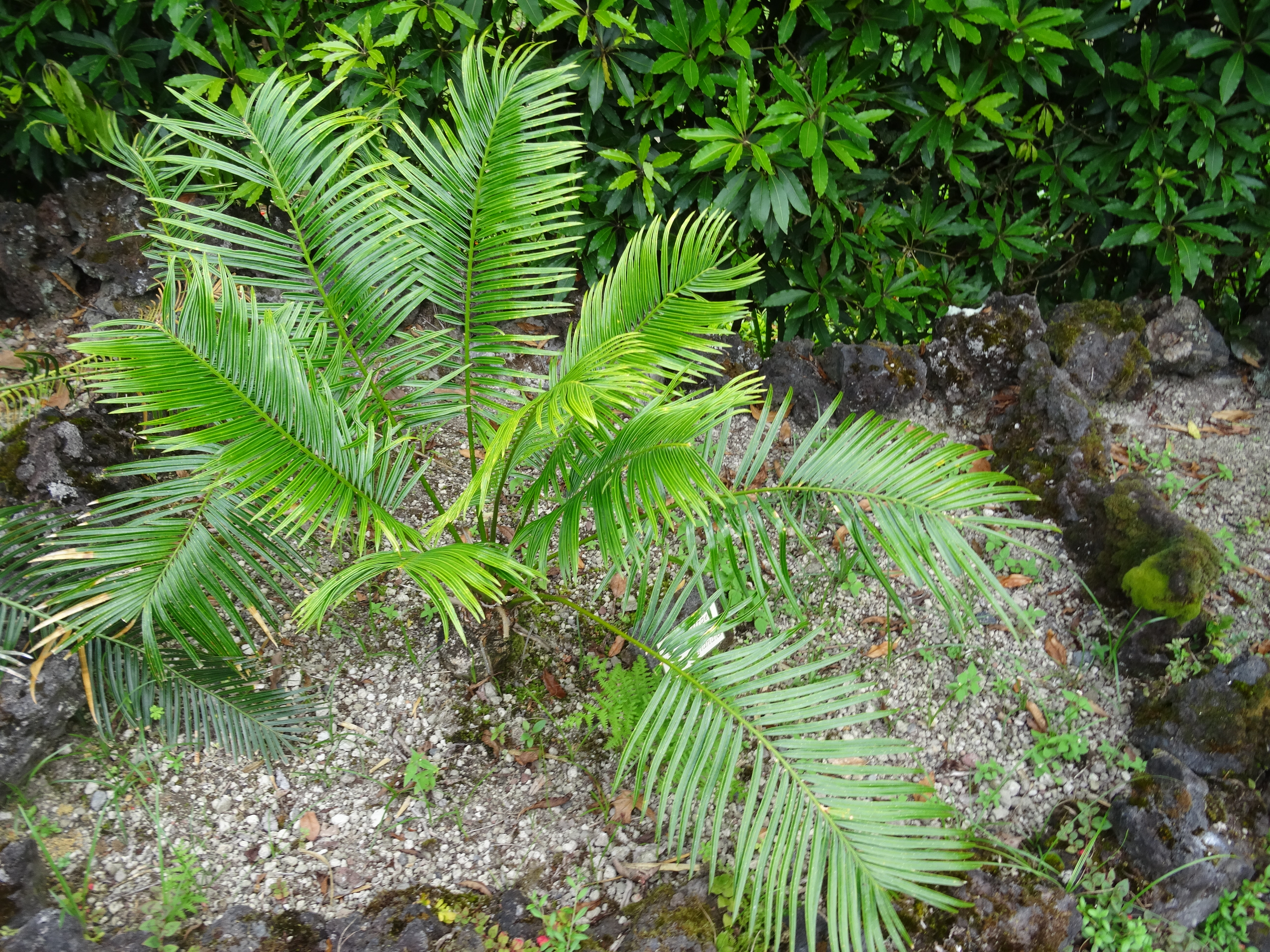

Conservation status
- Near Threatened (IUCN 3.1)

Scientific classification
- Kingdom: Plantae
- Clade: Tracheophytes
- Clade: Gymnospermae
- Division: Cycadophyta
- Class: Cycadopsida
- Order: Cycadales
- Family: Cycadaceae
- Genus: Cycas
- Species: C. petraea

Binomial name
- Cycas petraea A.Lindstr. & K.D.Hill

= Cycas petraea =

Species of cycad

Cycas petraea is a species of cycad endemic to Thailand.

It is known only from a single line of limestone mountains flanking the Phu Kra Dueng massif to the east, in Phu Kradueng National Park, Loei Province, Thailand.
