= Cycas yunnanensis =

Scientific classification
- Kingdom: Plantae
- Clade: Tracheophytes
- Clade: Gymnospermae
- Division: Cycadophyta
- Class: Cycadopsida
- Order: Cycadales
- Family: Cycadaceae
- Genus: Cycas
- Species: C. yunnanensis

Binomial name
- Cycas yunnanensis

Species of cycad

Cycas yunnanensis is a species of cycad in southwestern China. It is restricted to southern Sichuan and northern Yunnan.
