= Cycas falcata =

Conservation status
- Vulnerable (IUCN 3.1)

Scientific classification
- Kingdom: Plantae
- Clade: Tracheophytes
- Clade: Gymnospermae
- Division: Cycadophyta
- Class: Cycadopsida
- Order: Cycadales
- Family: Cycadaceae
- Genus: Cycas
- Species: C. falcata

Binomial name
- Cycas falcata K.D.Hill

Species of cycad

Cycas falcata is a little-known species of cycad endemic to Indonesia. It is found in Southeast Sulawesi and Kabaena Island.
