= Cycas aculeata =

Conservation status
- Endangered (IUCN 3.1)

Scientific classification
- Kingdom: Plantae
- Clade: Tracheophytes
- Clade: Gymnospermae
- Division: Cycadophyta
- Class: Cycadopsida
- Order: Cycadales
- Family: Cycadaceae
- Genus: Cycas
- Species: C. aculeata

Binomial name
- Cycas aculeata K.D.Hill & H.T.Nguyen

Species of cycad

Cycas aculeata is a species of cycad in the genus Cycas, native to Vietnam, where it is endemic to a single site on the south slopes of the Hai Van Pass.

It has a short subterranean stem 15–18 cm diameter, which bears 6-23 leaves. The leaves are 1.8-2.5 m long, and pinnate, with 100-150 leaflets and several basal spines; they are glossy dark green, but covered in orange pubescence at first which soon wears off. The leaflets are 35–52 cm long and 13–19 mm wide, and the basal spines .

The name derives from the Latin aculeatus, which translates as "prickly", indeed has short prominent spikes along the petiole (the leaf stalk). The stems are usually to slightly emergent, with trunk 6 inches in diameter. Emergent leaves are bright orange, and turn dark green with age, somewhat similar to Zamia integrifolia by coincidence.

The male cones are solitary, 15–20 cm long and 4–6 cm diameter; the female cones are undescribed.

== Habitat ==
This cycad is one of a number of related subterranean species native to SE Asia. It is most closely related to Cycas balansae, little is known about this cycad. It grows in deep loam over granite in the inner forests of Vietnam. During the Vietnam War, herbicide spraying and mass bombings may have severely upset the plant's native habitat and may have killed many of the plants.
