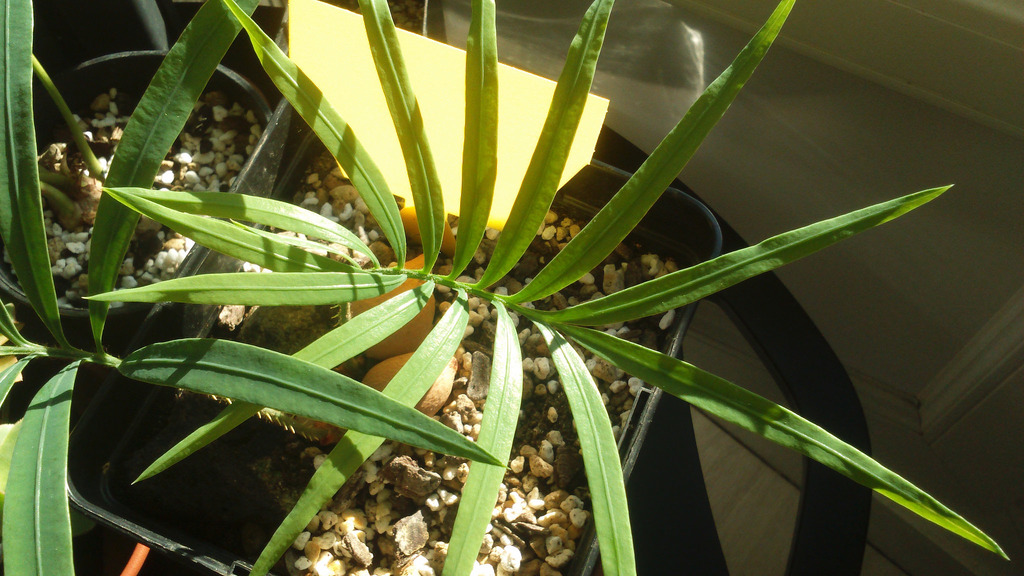

Conservation status
- Critically Endangered (IUCN 3.1)

Scientific classification
- Kingdom: Plantae
- Clade: Tracheophytes
- Clade: Gymnospermae
- Division: Cycadophyta
- Class: Cycadopsida
- Order: Cycadales
- Family: Cycadaceae
- Genus: Cycas
- Species: C. zambalensis

Binomial name
- Cycas zambalensis Madulid & Agoo

= Cycas zambalensis =

Species of cycad

Cycas zambalensis is a species of cycad endemic to Luzon, Philippines.

== Distribution ==
There are two subpopulations of Cycas zambalensis, which are found in:

1. Barangay San Juan in Botolan, Zambales
2. near Barangay Pundaquit in San Antonio, Zambales, and in Barangay Cawag in Subic, Zambales
