= Cycas lindstromii =

Conservation status
- Endangered (IUCN 3.1)

Scientific classification
- Kingdom: Plantae
- Clade: Tracheophytes
- Clade: Gymnospermae
- Division: Cycadophyta
- Class: Cycadopsida
- Order: Cycadales
- Family: Cycadaceae
- Genus: Cycas
- Species: C. lindstromii

Binomial name
- Cycas lindstromii S.L.Yang, K.D.Hill & Hiep

Species of cycad

Cycas lindstromii is a species of cycad endemic to southern Vietnam. It is found in Ba Ria-Vung Tau, Binh Thuan, Khanh Hoa, and Ninh Thuan provinces, Vietnam.
