= Cycas basaltica =

Conservation status
- Least Concern (IUCN 3.1)

Scientific classification
- Kingdom: Plantae
- Clade: Tracheophytes
- Clade: Gymnospermae
- Division: Cycadophyta
- Class: Cycadopsida
- Order: Cycadales
- Family: Cycadaceae
- Genus: Cycas
- Species: C. basaltica

Binomial name
- Cycas basaltica C.A.Gardner

Species of cycad

Cycas basaltica is a species of cycad in the genus Cycas, native to Australia, in the far north of Western Australia in the Kimberley region.

== Description ==
The stems grow to 2 m (rarely 4 m) tall and 15–23 cm in diameter, with a swollen base and an enlarged subterranean structure. There are 30 or more leaves in the crown, forming a bowl shaped, inward facing leaf crown, each leaf 80–125 cm long, pinnate, with 140-210 leaflets. Younger plants have spiny petioles, with older specimens losing this trait. The leaflets are covered with a dense layer of silver hairs, angled forward at 70-80°. The basal leaflets are reduced to spines, similar to Cycas revoluta. The taproot is contractile, and tends to pull crown downwards.

The female cones are open, with sporophylls 17–24 cm long, densely red-brown tomentose. Yellowish-brown sarcotesta, glabrous and/or glaucous. The male cones are solitary and erect, narrow conical, 18–24 cm long and 7–9 cm diameter.

== Habitat ==
It is named after the basaltic volcanic rock soils it is typically found growing on, where it occurs in eucalyptus groves near the Drysdale and Lawley Rivers, and nearby offshore islands. Conservation status secure.
