= Cycas nongnoochiae =

Conservation status
- Vulnerable (IUCN 3.1)

Scientific classification
- Kingdom: Plantae
- Clade: Tracheophytes
- Clade: Gymnospermae
- Division: Cycadophyta
- Class: Cycadopsida
- Order: Cycadales
- Family: Cycadaceae
- Genus: Cycas
- Species: C. nongnoochiae

Binomial name
- Cycas nongnoochiae K.D.Hill

Species of cycad

Cycas nongnoochiae is a species of cycad in Thailand. It is found only on limestone outcrops in Tak Fa District, Nakhon Sawan Province, central Thailand.
