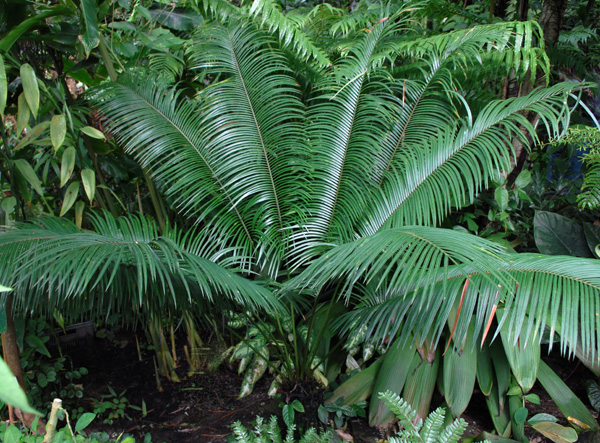

Conservation status
- Critically Endangered (IUCN 3.1)

Scientific classification
- Kingdom: Plantae
- Clade: Tracheophytes
- Clade: Gymnospermae
- Division: Cycadophyta
- Class: Cycadopsida
- Order: Cycadales
- Family: Cycadaceae
- Genus: Cycas
- Species: C. wadei

Binomial name
- Cycas wadei Merr.

= Cycas wadei =

Species of plant

Cycas wadei (Wade's pitogo) is a species of cycad endemic to Culion island, Philippines. There is only one subpopulation of about 5,000 mature individuals, located in a small area to the east of Halsey Harbor.
