= Cycas sancti-lasallei =

Scientific classification
- Kingdom: Plantae
- Clade: Tracheophytes
- Clade: Gymnospermae
- Division: Cycadophyta
- Class: Cycadopsida
- Order: Cycadales
- Family: Cycadaceae
- Genus: Cycas
- Species: C. sancti-lasallei

Binomial name
- Cycas sancti-lasallei Agoo & Madulid

Species of cycad

Cycas sancti-lasallei is a recently described species of cycad endemic to Mindanao, Philippines. It is found in the Cugman River watershed in Cagayan de Oro, Misamis Oriental, Philippines.
