= Cycas sainathii =

Scientific classification
- Kingdom: Plantae
- Clade: Tracheophytes
- Clade: Gymnospermae
- Division: Cycadophyta
- Class: Cycadopsida
- Order: Cycadales
- Family: Cycadaceae
- Genus: Cycas
- Species: C. sainathii

Binomial name
- Cycas sainathii R.C.Srivast.

Synonyms
- Cycas andamanica K.Prassad, M.V.Ramana, Sanjappa & B.R.P.Rao

Species of cycad

Cycas sainathii is a species of Cycad in India. Its type locality is Shibpur, Howrah district, West Bengal.
