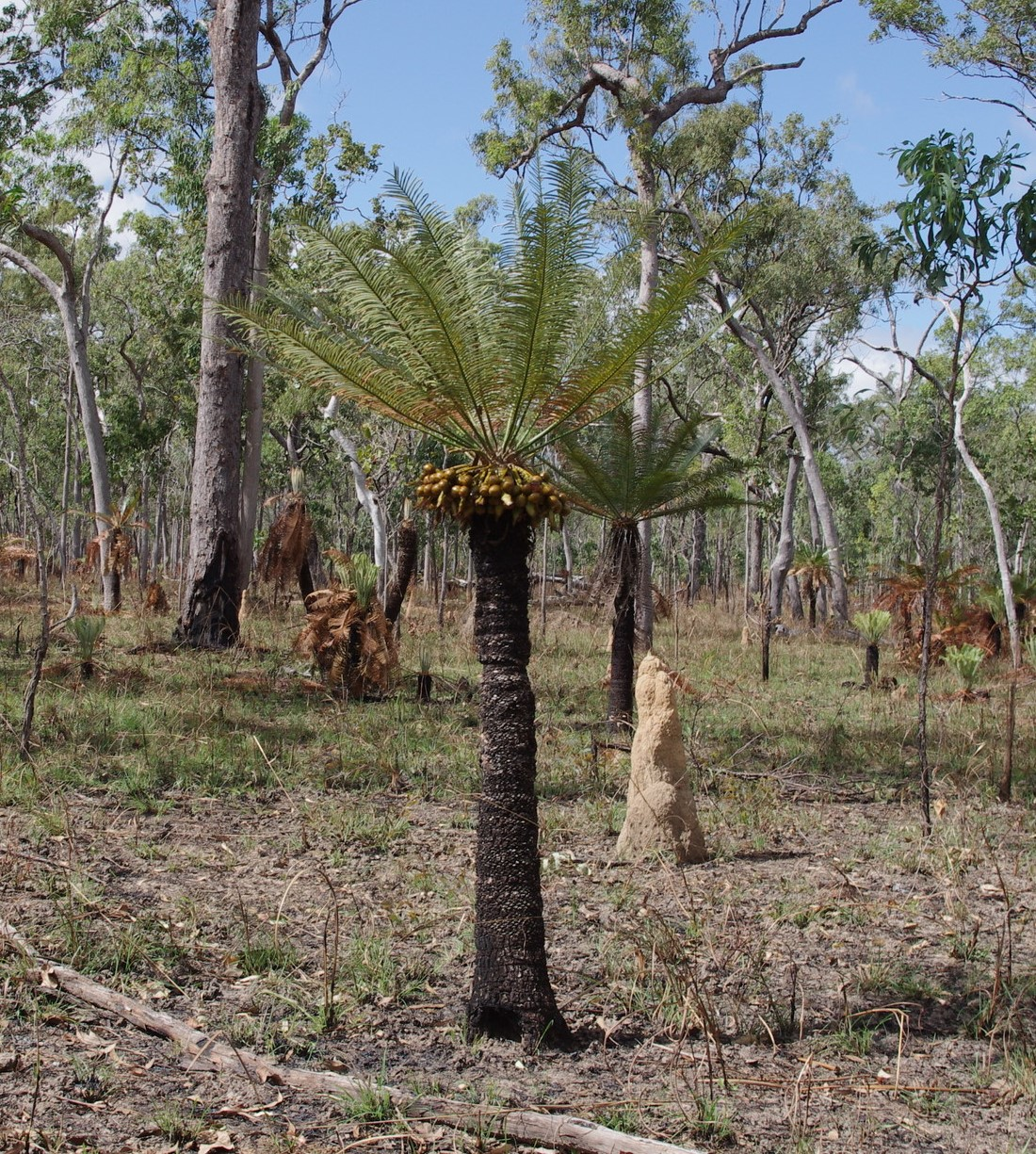
- In Queensland, Australia

Conservation status
- Near Threatened (IUCN 3.1)

Scientific classification
- Kingdom: Plantae
- Clade: Tracheophytes
- Clade: Gymnospermae
- Division: Cycadophyta
- Class: Cycadopsida
- Order: Cycadales
- Family: Cycadaceae
- Genus: Cycas
- Species: C. yorkiana

Binomial name
- Cycas yorkiana K.D.Hill

= Cycas yorkiana =

Species of cycad

Cycas yorkiana is a species of cycad found in Australia. It is native to Queensland, where it is confined to the Cape York Peninsula.
