= Cycas shanyaensis =

Conservation status
- Vulnerable (IUCN 3.1)

Scientific classification
- Kingdom: Plantae
- Clade: Tracheophytes
- Clade: Gymnospermae
- Division: Cycadophyta
- Class: Cycadopsida
- Order: Cycadales
- Family: Cycadaceae
- Genus: Cycas
- Species: C. shanyaensis

Binomial name
- Cycas shanyaensis G.A.Fu

Species of cycad

Cycas shanyaensis is a species of cycad endemic to Hainan, China.

== Range ==
Cycas shanyaensis is located in Yaxian, Hainan Island, China. Plants are found in the vicinity of Baolongshan (Baolongdong?) near Sanya City.
