= Cycas badensis =

Conservation status
- Least Concern (IUCN 3.1)

Scientific classification
- Kingdom: Plantae
- Clade: Tracheophytes
- Clade: Gymnospermae
- Division: Cycadophyta
- Class: Cycadopsida
- Order: Cycadales
- Family: Cycadaceae
- Genus: Cycas
- Species: C. badensis

Binomial name
- Cycas badensis K.D.Hill

Species of cycad

Cycas badensis is a species of cycad in the genus Cycas, native to Australia, in the extreme north of Queensland, where it is endemic on Badu Island in the Torres Strait Islands.

The stems grow up to 8 m tall. The leaves are numerous, 1-1.2 m long, pinnate, with 200-230 leaflets, the leaflets 11–22 cm long and 5-7.5 mm wide. The emerging new leaves are densely orange-brown tomentose, becoming bright green and moderately glossy on the upper side, lighter green on underside.

The female cones are open, very wooly and brown tomentose, with ovules per cone. Cones wide. Sarcotesta orange-brown.

== Habitat ==
This cycad prefers Eucalyptus groves in the far northern region of Queensland in the tropical grasslands of Badu Island. Recently first described in 1996, it is found only in this remote island of Australia. Little is known of the plant, and it is not common in cultivation.
