= Cycas nitida =

Scientific classification
- Kingdom: Plantae
- Clade: Tracheophytes
- Clade: Gymnospermae
- Division: Cycadophyta
- Class: Cycadopsida
- Order: Cycadales
- Family: Cycadaceae
- Genus: Cycas
- Species: C. nitida

Binomial name
- Cycas nitida K.D.Hill & A.Lindstr.

Species of cycad

Cycas nitida is a species of cycad endemic to the northern Philippines. It is found in littoral forests.

== Range ==
Cycas nitida has been recorded in the following locations.

- Babuyan Islands: Dalupiri
- Luzon: Quezon, Polillo, Alabat, Rapu-Rapu
