= Cycas cantafolia =

Scientific classification
- Kingdom: Plantae
- Clade: Tracheophytes
- Clade: Gymnospermae
- Division: Cycadophyta
- Class: Cycadopsida
- Order: Cycadales
- Family: Cycadaceae
- Genus: Cycas
- Species: C. cantafolia

Binomial name
- Cycas cantafolia Jutta, K.L.Chew & Saw

Species of cycad

Cycas cantafolia is a species of cycad endemic to peninsular Malaysia. It is only found in a chain of low-elevation hills west of the southern tip of the Gunung Ledang massif (Mount Ophir) in Johor.
