= Cycas lacrimans =

Scientific classification
- Kingdom: Plantae
- Clade: Tracheophytes
- Clade: Gymnospermae
- Division: Cycadophyta
- Class: Cycadopsida
- Order: Cycadales
- Family: Cycadaceae
- Genus: Cycas
- Species: C. lacrimans

Binomial name
- Cycas lacrimans A.Lindstr. & K.D.Hill

Species of cycad

Cycas lacrimans is a species of cycad endemic to Mindanao, Philippines.

== Range ==
Cycas lacrimans has been recorded in the following locations within Davao Oriental Province, Mindanao.

- Mati, Davao Oriental
- San Isidro, Davao Oriental
- Mount Galintan
- Mount Hamiguitan
