= Cycas hoabinhensis =

Conservation status
- Endangered (IUCN 3.1)

Scientific classification
- Kingdom: Plantae
- Clade: Tracheophytes
- Clade: Gymnospermae
- Division: Cycadophyta
- Class: Cycadopsida
- Order: Cycadales
- Family: Cycadaceae
- Genus: Cycas
- Species: C. hoabinhensis

Binomial name
- Cycas hoabinhensis P.K.Lôc & H.T.Nguyen

Species of cycad

Cycas hoabinhensis is a species of cycad endemic to central Vietnam, where it is found in Hòa Bình, Hà Nam, Hà Tây, and Ninh Bình provinces.

== Conservation ==
Cycas hoabinhensis is protected in Cúc Phương National Park in Ninh Bình province, Chua Hương Tich Nature Reserve in Hà Tây province, and Thuong Tien Nature Reserve in Hòa Bình province. It has been extensively collected from the wild for ornamental purposes in Hanoi.
