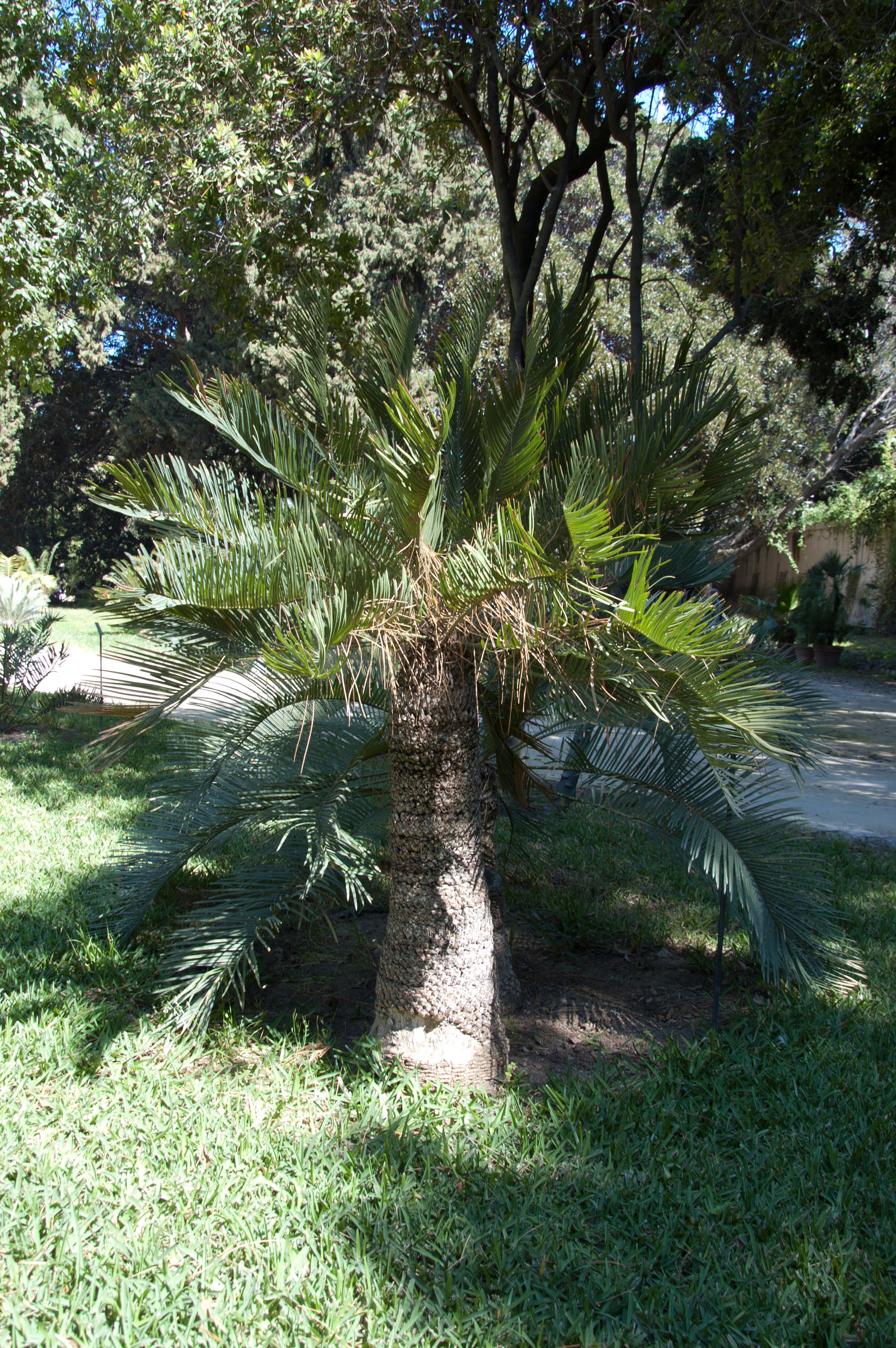

Conservation status
- Vulnerable (IUCN 3.1)

Scientific classification
- Kingdom: Plantae
- Clade: Embryophytes
- Clade: Tracheophytes
- Clade: Spermatophytes
- Clade: Gymnospermae
- Division: Cycadophyta
- Class: Cycadopsida
- Order: Cycadales
- Family: Cycadaceae
- Genus: Cycas
- Species: C. ophiolitica

Binomial name
- Cycas ophiolitica K.D.Hill

= Cycas ophiolitica =

Species of cycad

Cycas ophiolitica is an endangered species of cycad, native to Queensland, Australia.
