= Cycas hongheensis =

Conservation status
- Critically Endangered (IUCN 3.1)

Scientific classification
- Kingdom: Plantae
- Clade: Embryophytes
- Clade: Tracheophytes
- Clade: Gymnosperms
- Division: Cycadophyta
- Class: Cycadopsida
- Order: Cycadales
- Family: Cycadaceae
- Genus: Cycas
- Species: C. hongheensis

Binomial name
- Cycas hongheensis S.Y.Yang & S.L.Yang

Species of cycad

Cycas hongheensis is a species of cycad endemic to Yunnan, southern China. It is found in Gejiu and Shiping County (near Nujie 牛街镇). It is also found in Dawei Mountain Nature Reserve. Only two wild populations remain, both with fewer than 1,000 individuals.
