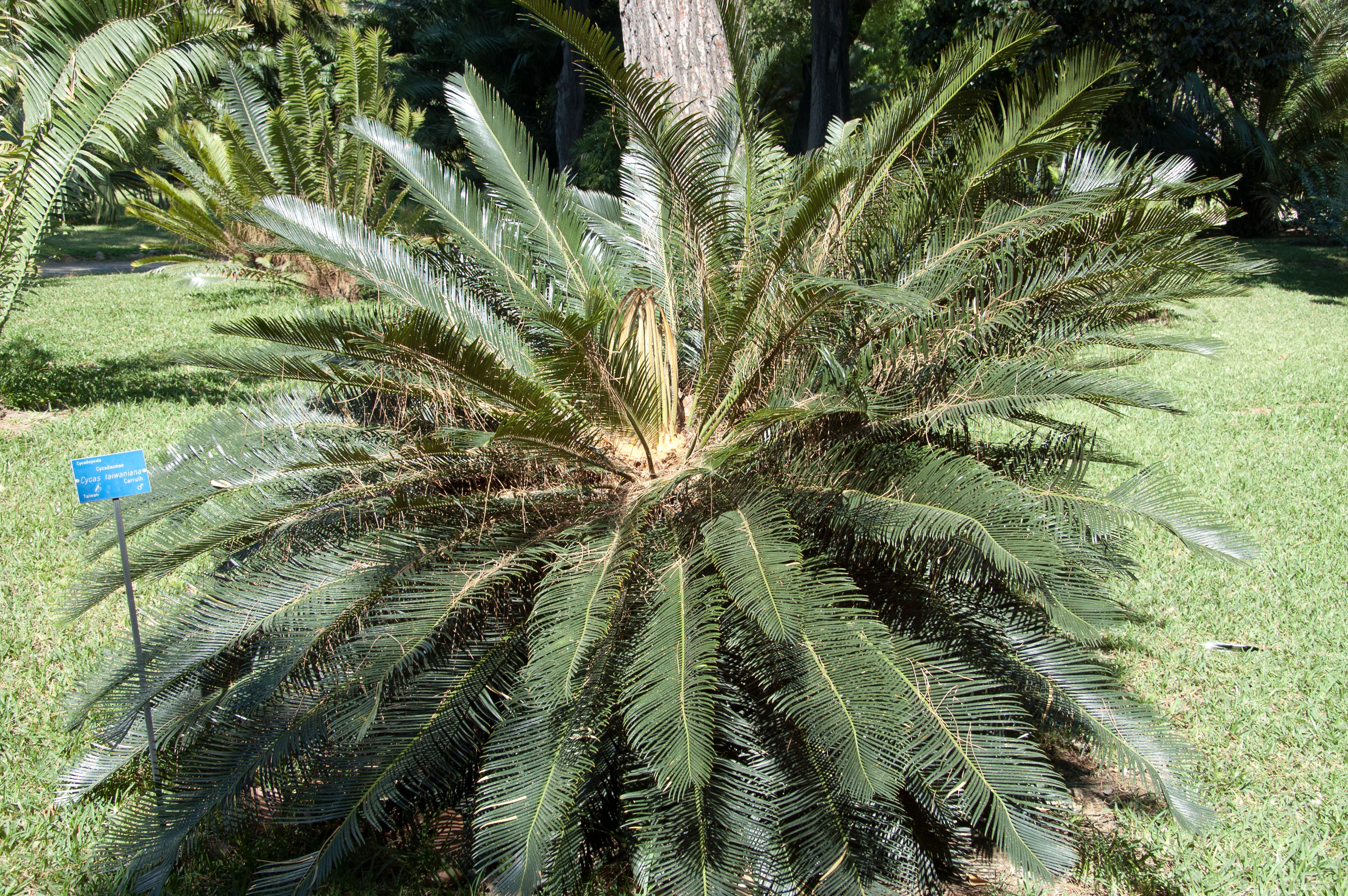

Conservation status
- Endangered (IUCN 3.1)

Scientific classification
- Kingdom: Plantae
- Clade: Tracheophytes
- Clade: Gymnospermae
- Division: Cycadophyta
- Class: Cycadopsida
- Order: Cycadales
- Family: Cycadaceae
- Genus: Cycas
- Species: C. taiwaniana

Binomial name
- Cycas taiwaniana Carruth.

= Cycas taiwaniana =

Species of cycad

Cycas taiwaniana is a species of plant in the genus Cycas. The species is native to Yunnan, Guangdong, Guangxi and Fujian in China. Although the specific epithet, taiwaniana, is derived from Taiwan, where the original type specimens were found, it is not naturally distributed in Taiwan. Instead of C. taiwaniana, the original type specimens used for describing C. taiwaniana, had been reclassified under another species, Cycas taitungensis.
