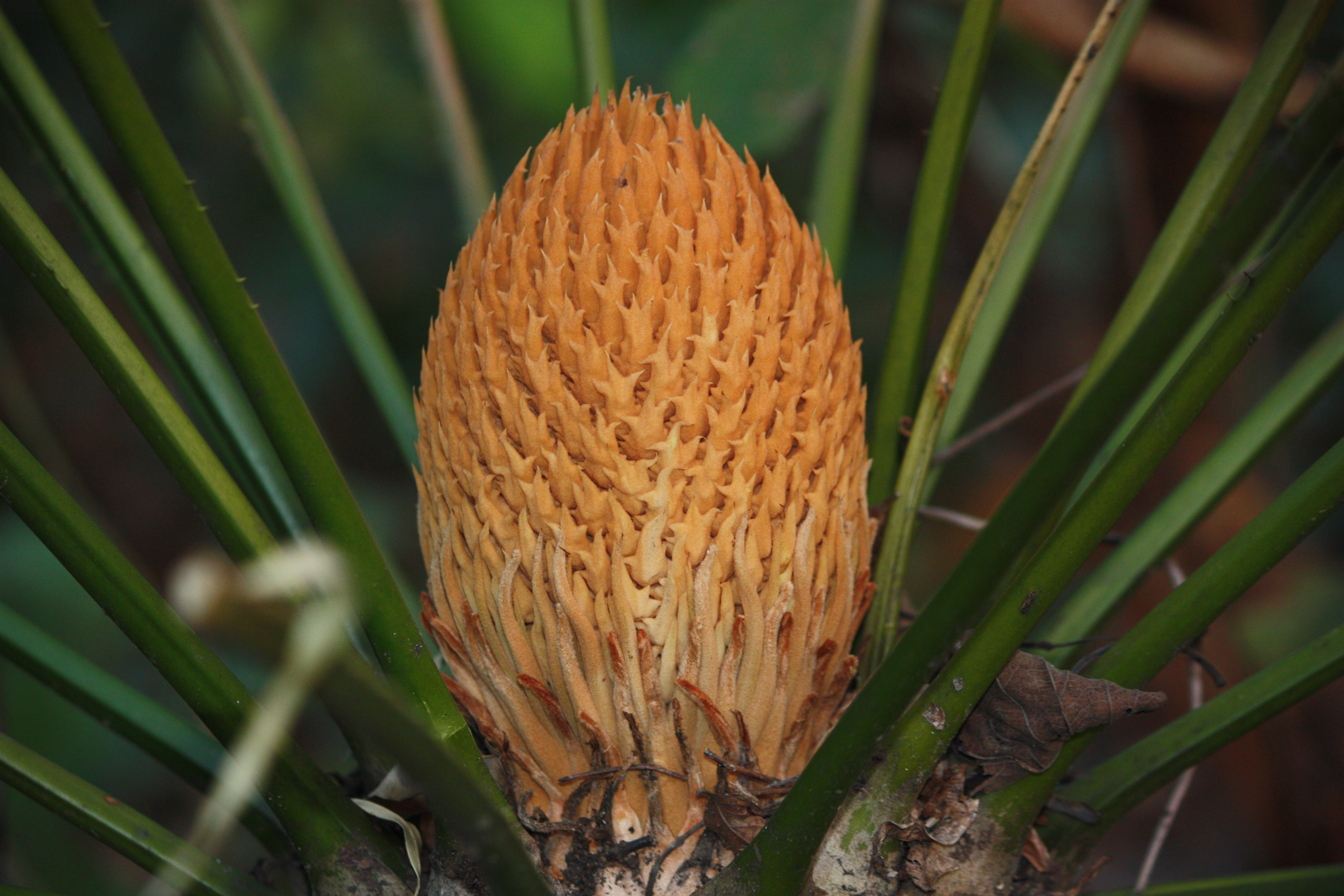

Scientific classification
- Kingdom: Plantae
- Clade: Tracheophytes
- Clade: Gymnospermae
- Division: Cycadophyta
- Class: Cycadopsida
- Order: Cycadales
- Family: Cycadaceae
- Genus: Cycas
- Species: C. orixensis

Binomial name
- Cycas orixensis (Haines) Singh & Khuraijam

= Cycas orixensis =

Species of cycad

Cycas orixensis is an endemic species found in the Indian state of Odisha. The species was recently discovered by Indian scientists, Rita Singh, P. Radha and J.S. Khuraijam
