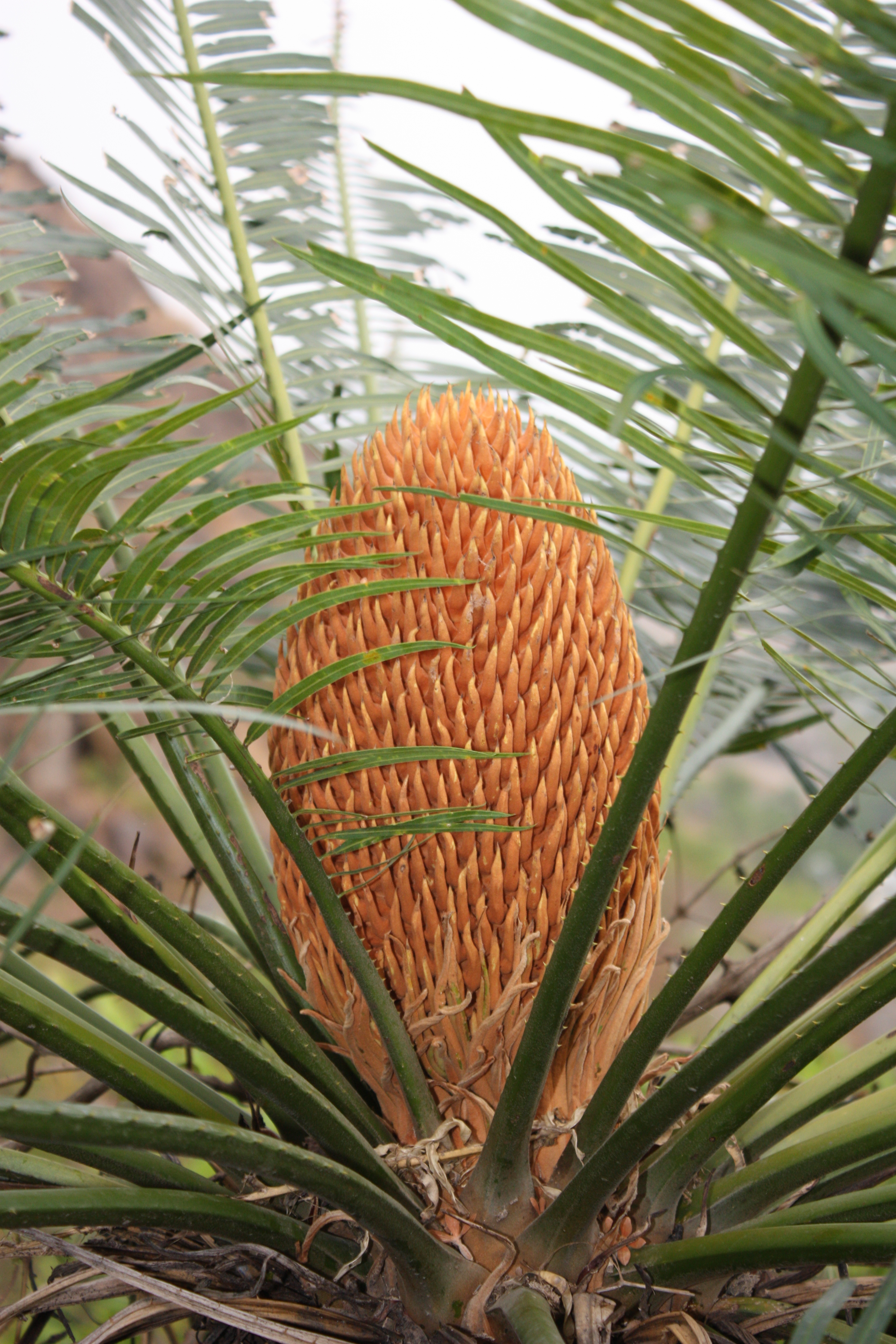

Scientific classification
- Kingdom: Plantae
- Clade: Tracheophytes
- Clade: Gymnospermae
- Division: Cycadophyta
- Class: Cycadopsida
- Order: Cycadales
- Family: Cycadaceae
- Genus: Cycas
- Species: C. nayagarhensis

Binomial name
- Cycas nayagarhensis Singh, Radha & Khuraijam

= Cycas nayagarhensis =

Species of cycad

Cycas nayagarhensis is a species found only in Nayagarh district of Odisha in India. The species was recently discovered by Indian scientists Rita Singh, P. Radha, and J.S. Khuraijam.
