= Cycas pachypoda =

Conservation status
- Critically Endangered (IUCN 3.1)

Scientific classification
- Kingdom: Plantae
- Clade: Tracheophytes
- Clade: Gymnospermae
- Division: Cycadophyta
- Class: Cycadopsida
- Order: Cycadales
- Family: Cycadaceae
- Genus: Cycas
- Species: C. pachypoda

Binomial name
- Cycas pachypoda K.D.Hill

Species of cycad

Cycas pachypoda is a species of cycad endemic to Vietnam. It is found in Binh Thuan, Ninh Thuan, and possibly Dong Nai provinces, southern Vietnam.
