= Cycas szechuanensis =

Conservation status
- Critically Endangered (IUCN 3.1)

Scientific classification
- Kingdom: Plantae
- Clade: Tracheophytes
- Clade: Gymnospermae
- Division: Cycadophyta
- Class: Cycadopsida
- Order: Cycadales
- Family: Cycadaceae
- Genus: Cycas
- Species: C. szechuanensis

Binomial name
- Cycas szechuanensis C.Y.Cheng, W.C.Cheng & L.K.Fu

Species of cycad

Cycas szechuanensis is a species of cycad endemic to eastern China. It is known from eastern Guangdong and eastern Fujian provinces, China. It is also cultivated at Fuhu Temple (伏虎寺), Mount Emei, Sichuan.
