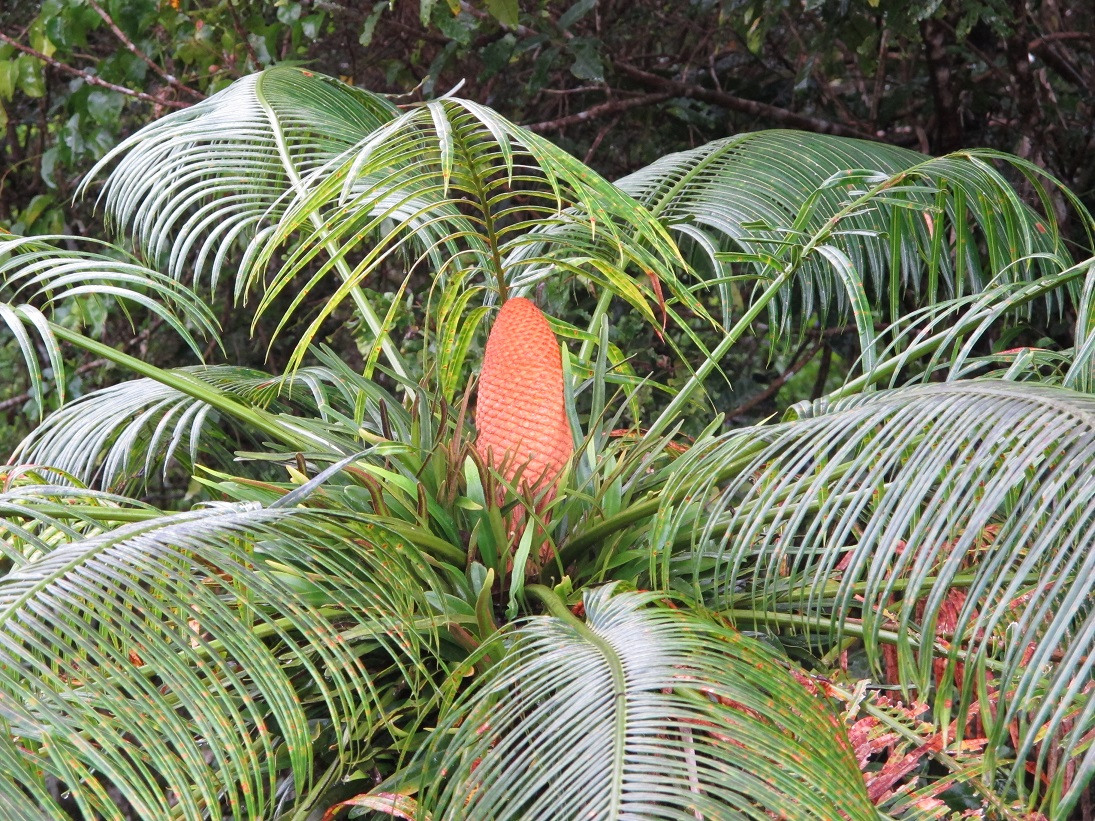

Conservation status
- Endangered (IUCN 3.1)

- Threatened (ESA)

Scientific classification
- Kingdom: Plantae
- Clade: Tracheophytes
- Clade: Gymnospermae
- Division: Cycadophyta
- Class: Cycadopsida
- Order: Cycadales
- Family: Cycadaceae
- Genus: Cycas
- Species: C. micronesica

Binomial name
- Cycas micronesica K.D. Hill, 1994

= Cycas micronesica =

Species of cycad

Cycas micronesica is a species of cycad found on the island of Yap in Micronesia, the Mariana islands of Guam and Rota, and The Republic of Palau. It is commonly known as federico nut or fadang in Chamorro. The species, previously lumped with Cycas rumphii and Cycas circinalis, was described as a unique species in 1994 by Ken Hill. Paleoecological studies have determined that Cycas micronesica has been present on the island of Guam for about 9,000 years. It has been implicated as a factor in Lytico-Bodig disease, a condition similar to amyotrophic lateral sclerosis (ALS), due to the presence of the neurotoxin BMAA found in its seeds. Seeds were a traditional food source on Guam until the 1960s. The neurotoxin is present due to a symbiosis with cyanobacteria.

== Description ==
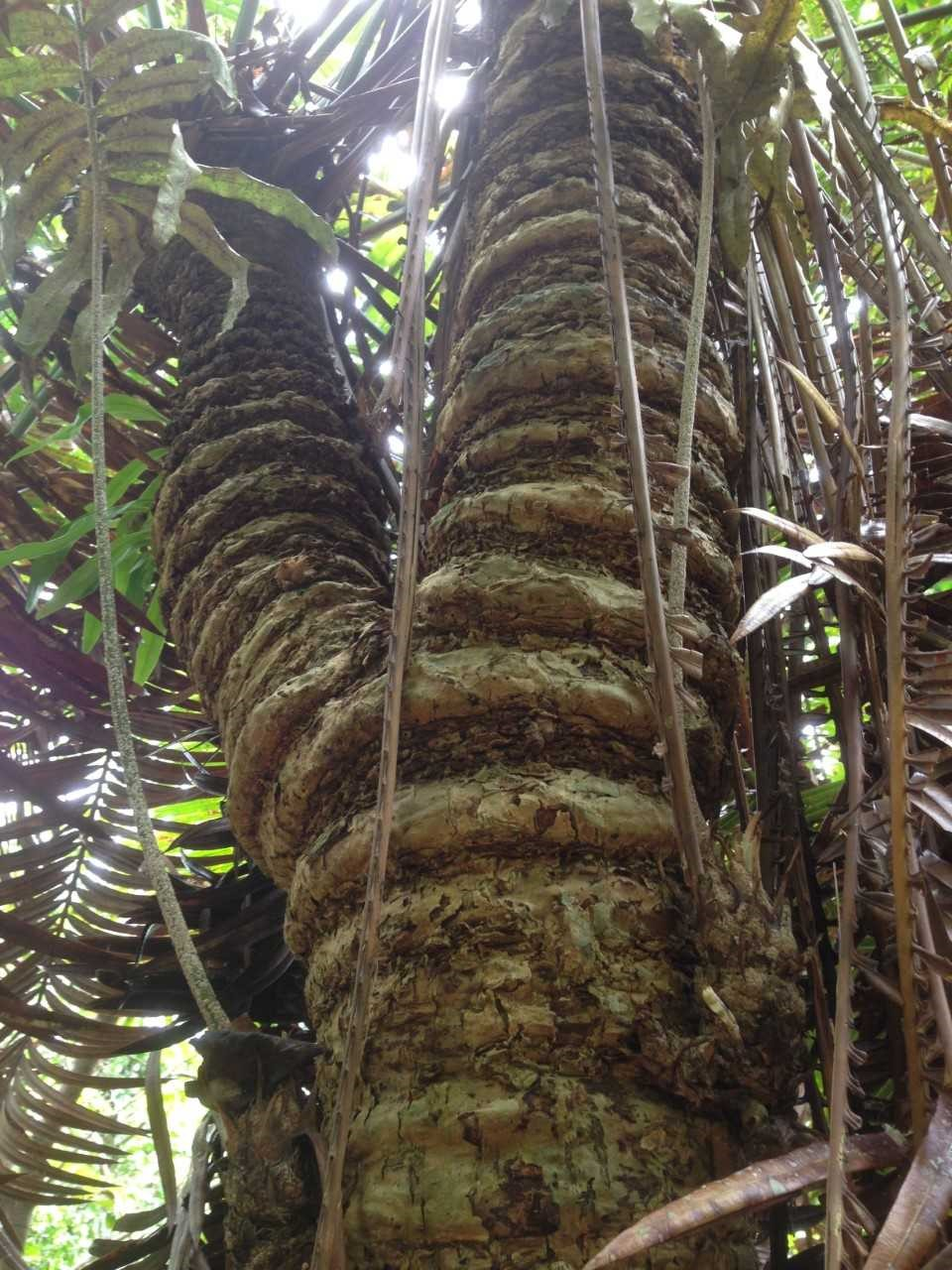
Trunk with ringed leaf scars

Cycas micronesica is a medium-sized tree most commonly 2–5 meters tall but can reach heights up to 15 meters. The tree has a straight palm-like trunk ringed with frond scars.

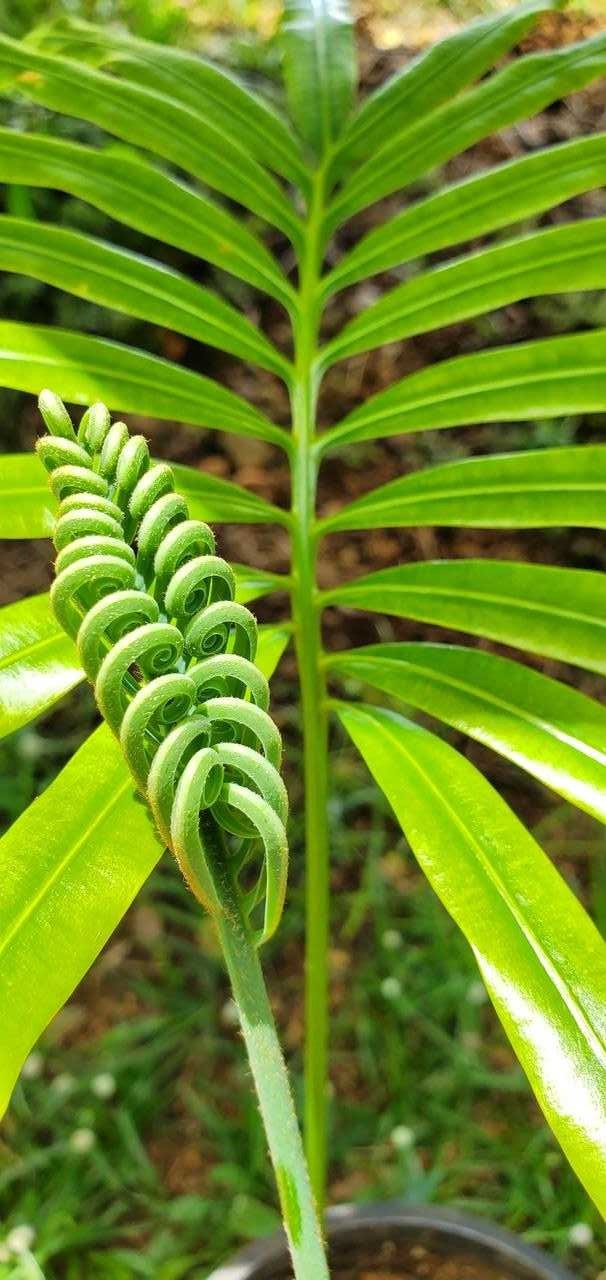

=== Leaves ===
Leaves are 140–180 cm long, flat in section (opposing pinnae inserted at 180 degrees on rachis), with 130 -150 pinnae, terminated by a spine approximately 4mm long; petiole usually glabrous, usually unarmed, rarely spinescent for up to 20% of length, 35 – 45 cm long; median pinnae at 70-80 degrees to rachis, 240 – 280 mm long, 16 –17 mm wide, 0.35 - 0.45 mm thick, glabrous, dull green or slightly bluish-green when developing, becoming glossy mid-green at maturity, flat in section with slightly recurved margins, strongly discolorous, decurrent for 7–10 mm, narrowed to 5.0-6.0 mm at base, 17 – 20 mm apart on rachis apex attenuate; midrib not sharply raised, more or less equally prominent above and below, 1.2 -1.5 mm wide.

=== Reproductive organs ===
Like all cycads, Cycas micronesica are dioecious. Females possess clusters of ovules situated on modified leaves called megasporophylls. Male reproductive structures consist of modified leaves called microsporophylls, but each modified leaf has small, compact pollen sacks attached to their lower surface. There has been documentation of a symbiotic relationship between Cycas micronesica and an Anatrachyntis moth species on Guam, which depends on male cones (microsporangia) for oviposition and recruitment in return for pollinating the female cone.

==== Female cones (megasporophylls) ====
The female cones are pale fawn to pale orange-brown, narrowly ovoid, 30–50 cm long, 8–10 cm in diameter. Megasporophylls 27–33 cm long, grey- and orange-tomentose, with 2-6 ovules, lamina 45–55 mm wide, broadly ovate to elliptical, regularly dentate with 16-20 lateral spines, apical spine 8–15 mm long, lateral spines 2–6 mm long. Seeds flatten to ovoid, green becoming orange, not pruinose, 50–60 mm long, 45–50 mm in diameter; sarcotesta 3–6 mm thick.

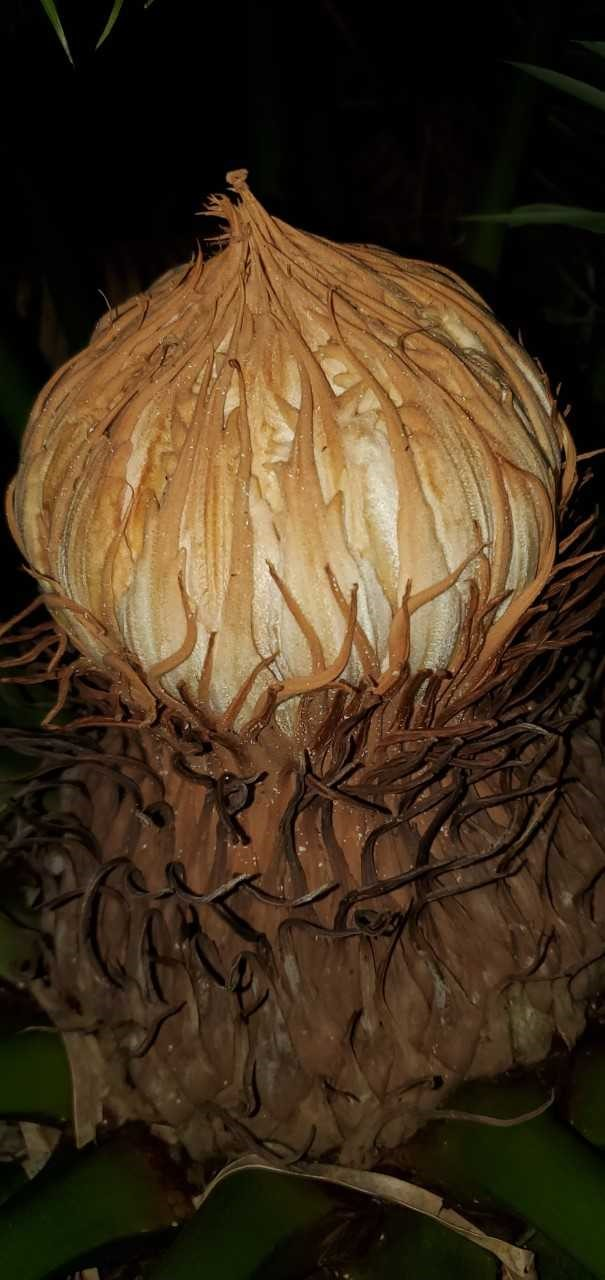
Female cone with closed megasporophylls

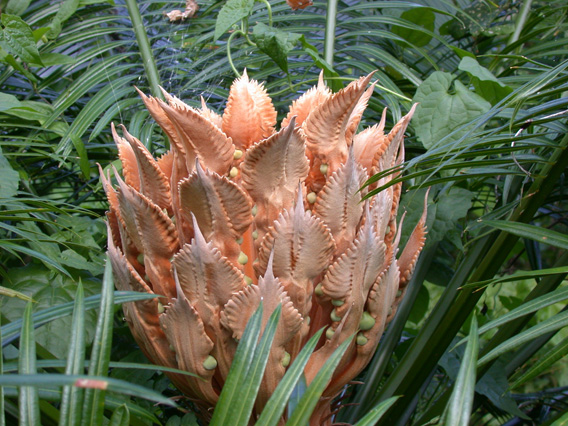
Female cone (megasporophylls) with immature green ovules

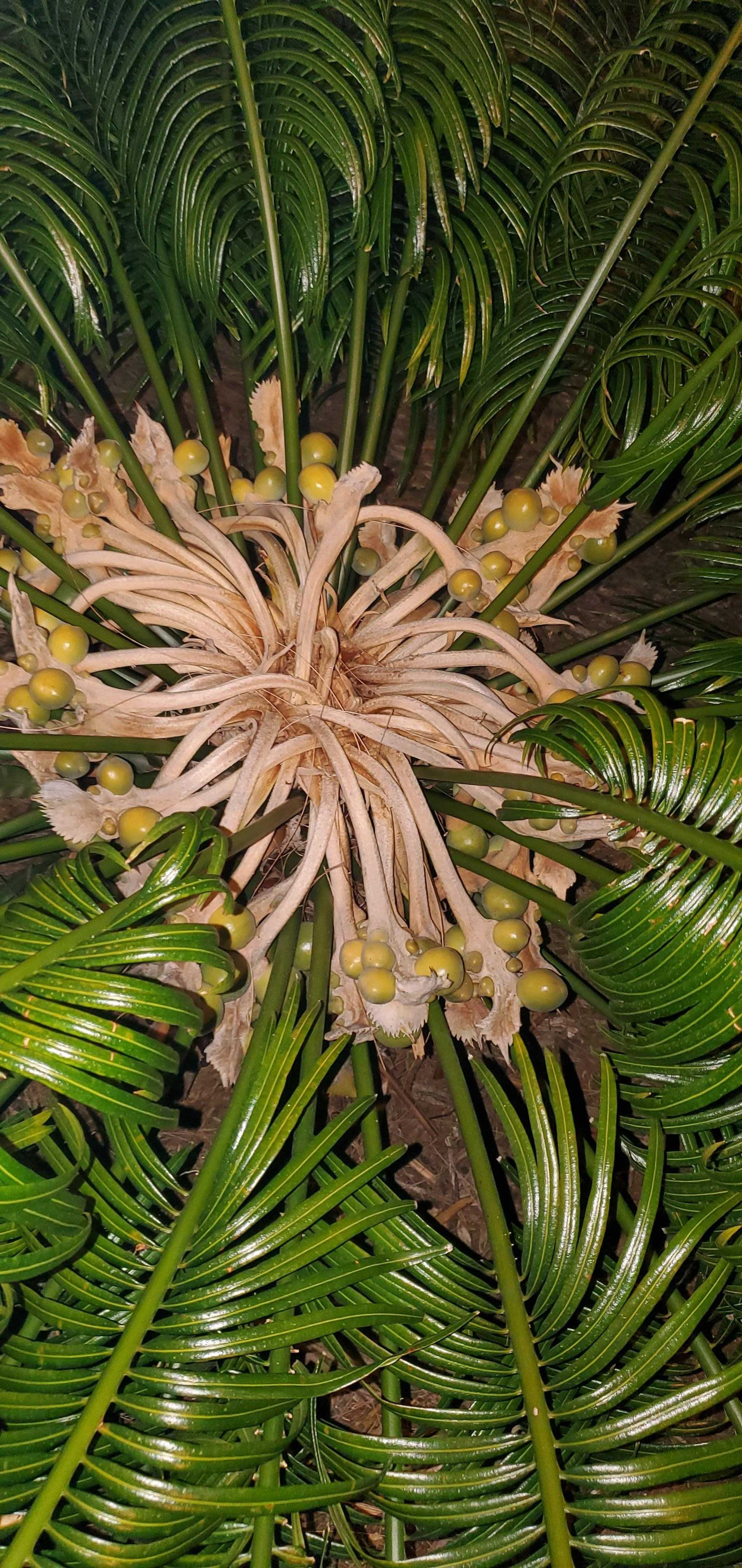
Female cone with drooping megasporophylls and developing ovules

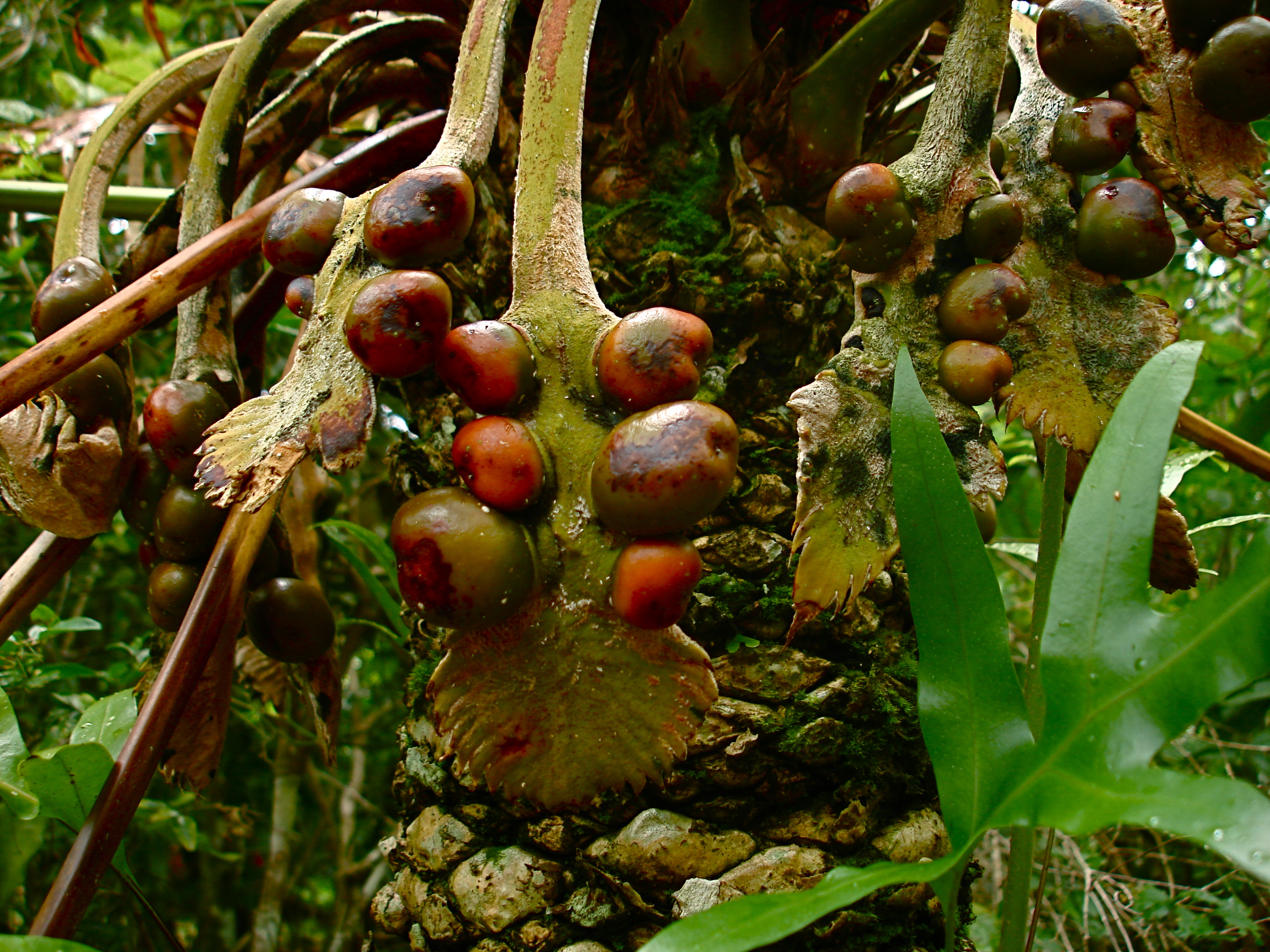
Fertilized megasporangia with developing seeds

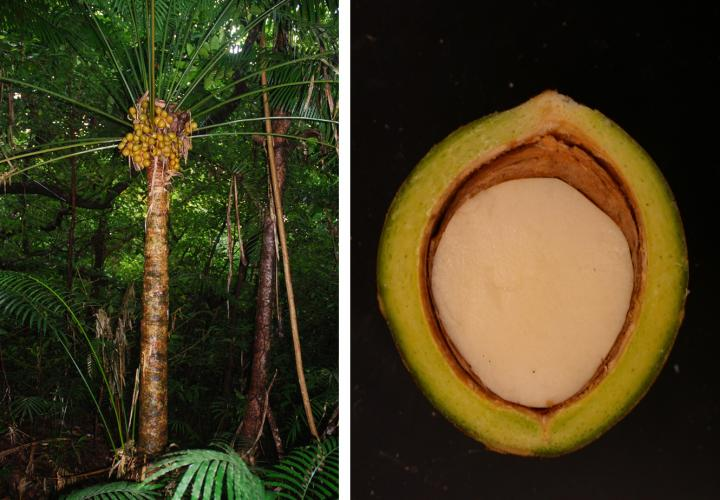
Developed seed

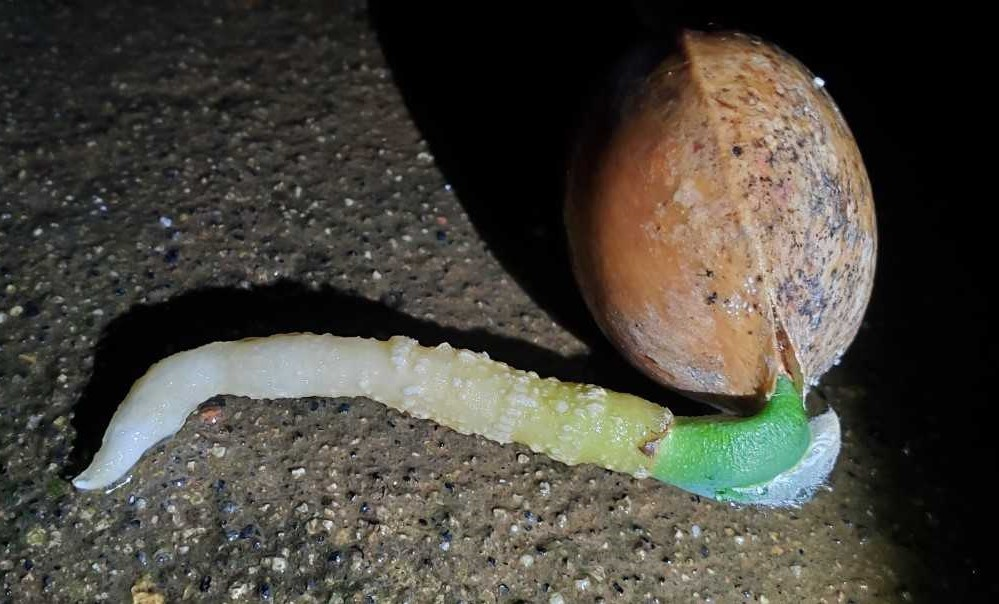
Cycas micronesica seed and root. Dededo, Guam

==== Male cones (microsporophylls) ====
Microsporophyll laminae are 35–45 mm long, 20–25 mm wide; fertile zone 25–35 mm long; sterile apex 7–10 mm long, not recurved, apical spine somewhat reduced, broad, sharply upturned, 2 mm long.

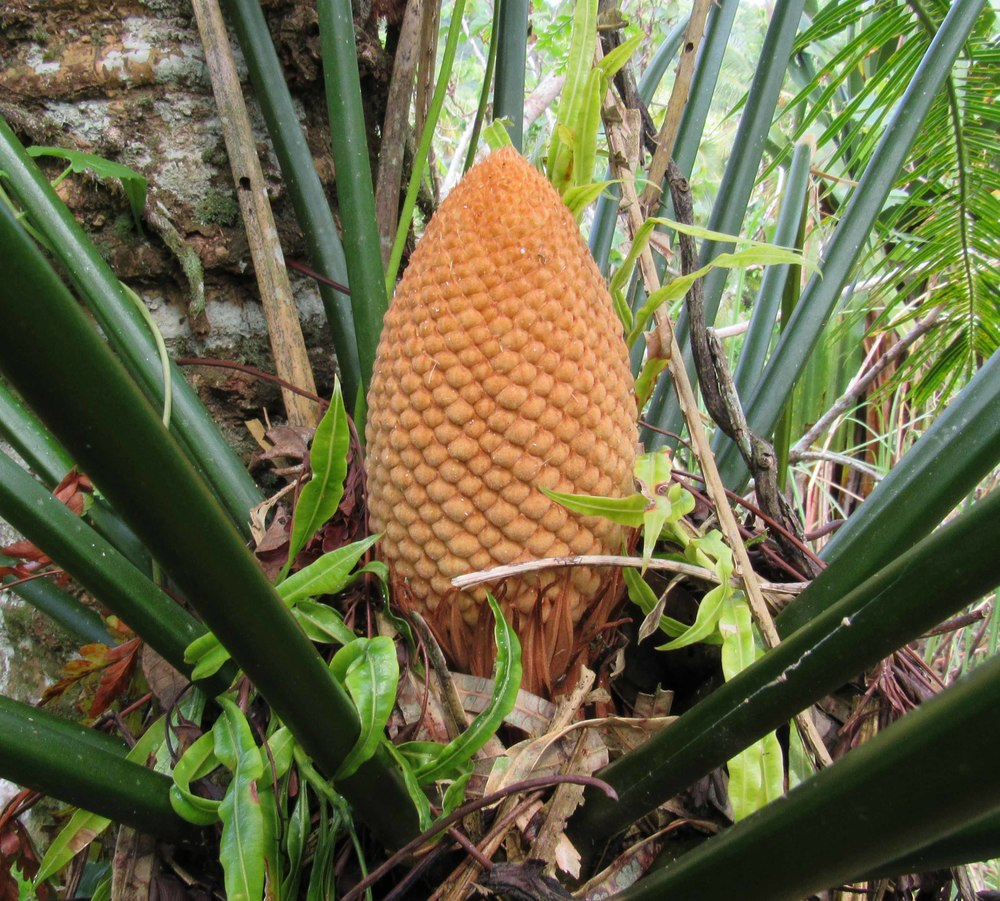
Male cone with closed microsporangia

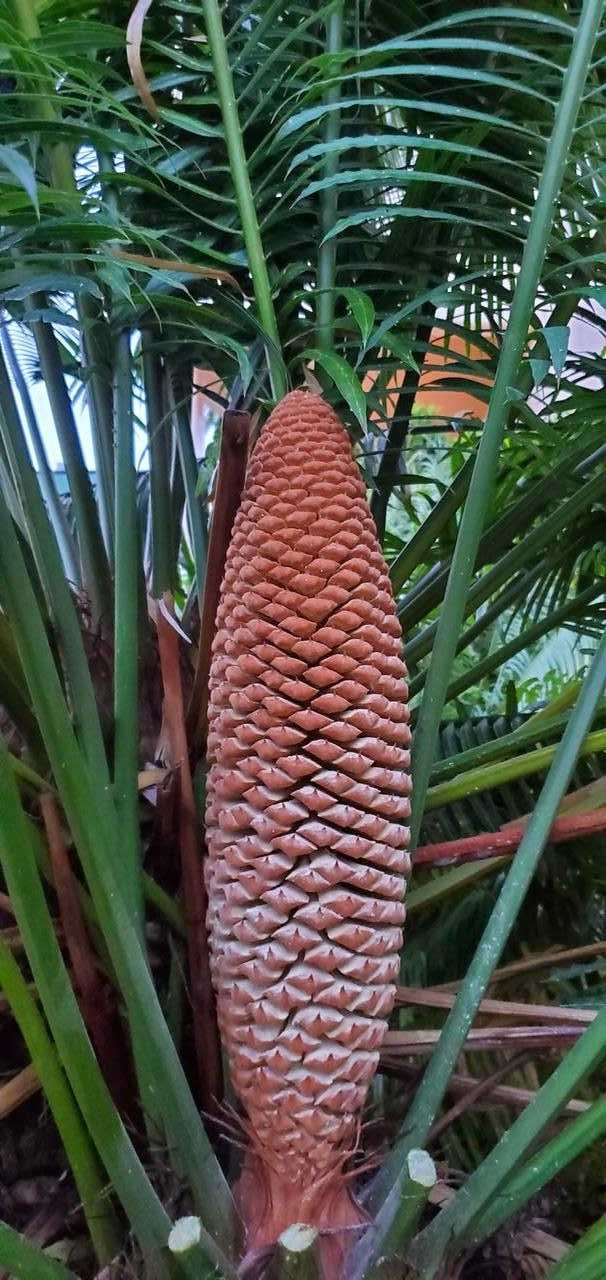
Male cone with open microsporangia and pollen

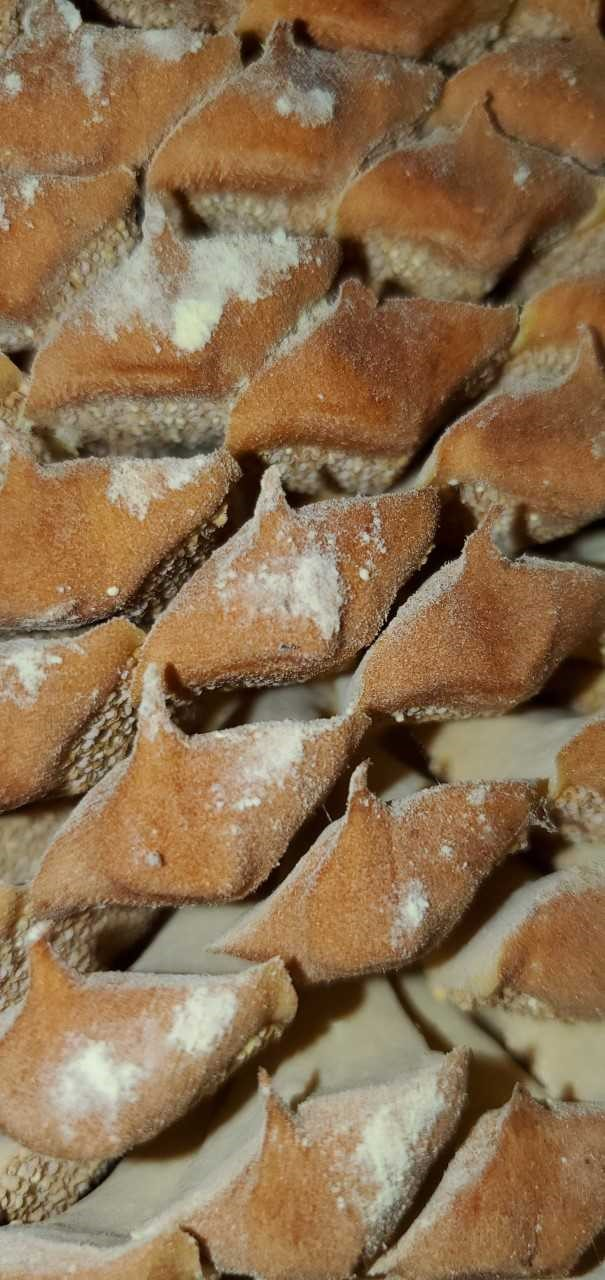
Microsporangia of male cone with pollen

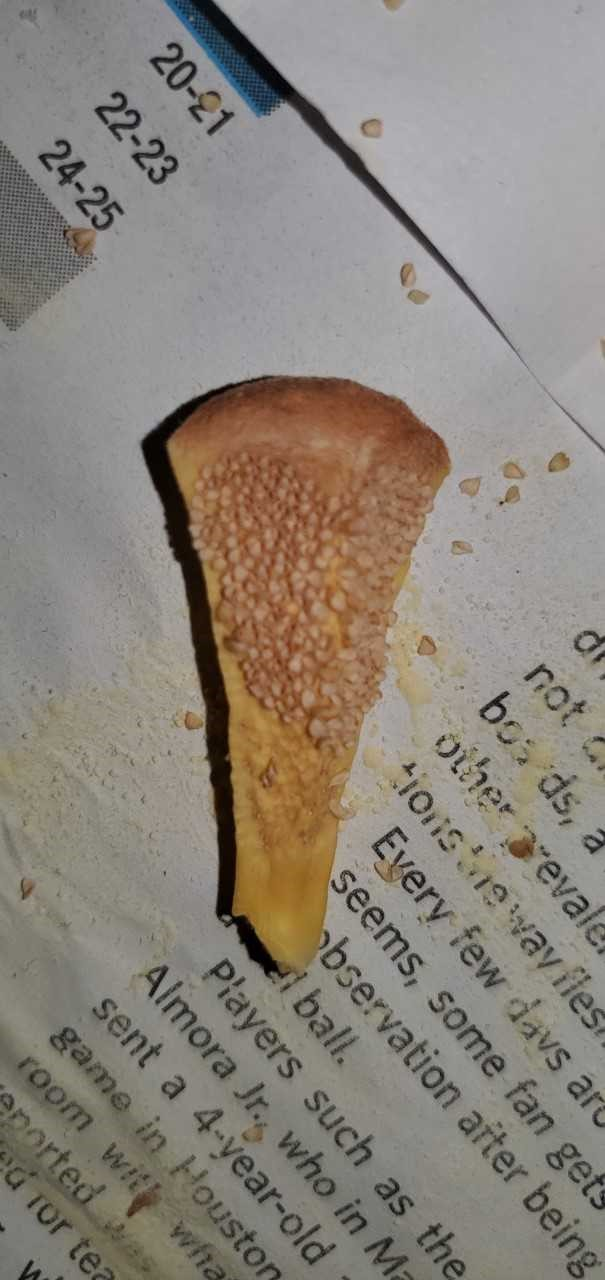
Microsporangium with pollen sacks and yellow pollen

== Toxicity ==
Cycad seeds contain Β-Methylamino-L-alanine, a non-proteinogenic amino acid and neurotoxin. Chronic dietary exposure to BMAA is now considered to be a cause of the amyotrophic lateral sclerosis/parkinsonism–dementia complex (ALS/PDC) that had an extremely high rate of incidence among the Chamorro people of Guam. The Chamorro call the condition lytico-bodig. In the 1950s, ALS/PDC prevalence ratios and death rates for Chamorro residents of Guam and Rota were 50–100 times that of developed countries, including the United States. No demonstrable heritable or viral factors were found for the disease, and a subsequent decline of ALS/PDC after 1963 on Guam led to the search for responsible environmental agents. The use of flour made from cycad seed) in traditional food items decreased as that plant became rarer and the Chamorro population became more Americanized following World War II. Cycads harbor symbiotic cyanobacteria of the genus Nostoc in specialized roots which push up through the leaf litter into the light; these cyanobacteria produce BMAA.

In addition to eating traditional food items from cycad flour directly, BMAA may be ingested by humans through biomagnification. Flying foxes, a Chamorro delicacy, forage on the fleshy seed covering of cycad seeds and concentrate the toxin in their bodies. Twenty-four specimens of flying foxes from museum collections were tested for BMAA, which was found in large concentrations in the flying foxes from Guam. As of 2021 studies continued examining BMAA biomagnification in marine and estuarine systems and its possible impact on human health outside of Guam.

== Conservation ==
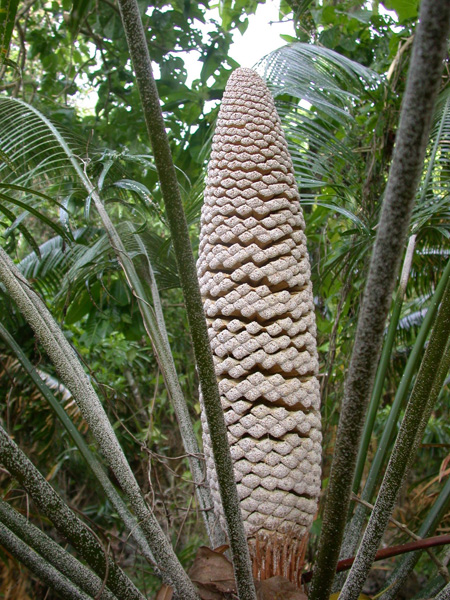
Male cone and leaves infested with cycad aulacaspis scale (CAS)

Cycas micronesica is threatened by a combination of introduced species throughout the islands of Guam and Rota. The most notable pest is the diaspidid scale, Aulacaspis yasumatsui, which was first recognized on Guam in December 2003. Other threats include cycad blue butterfly (Luthrodes pandava); the longhorn beetle (Acalolepta marianarum), which causes stem damage; the alien invasive snail Satsuma mercatoria, which feeds on young leaflets; and habitat loss due to the growing human population and military activities. Prior to the invasion of Aulacaspis yasumatsui, it was one of the most abundant plants in Guam's forests. Plant mortality was so rapid that the species was listed as Endangered by the IUCN Red List in 2006, only three years after the devastating invasions began. Population counts in northwest Guam had declined from 686 individuals in early 2004 (before Aulacaspis yasumatsui reached this habitat) to 87 individuals in January 2007. Cycas micronesica used to have stable populations across Micronesia, with Guam having the largest. However, the Aulacaspis scale invasion caused an 87% decline in the Guam subpopulation over ten years. In 2004, Rhyzobius lophanthae was introduced on Guam as a biological pest control and has lessened the population decline. However, they were ineffective at protecting cycad seedlings from Aulacaspis yasumatsui predation, as lack of seed vigor is one of the major factors contributing to Cycas micronesica decline. Without effective action against the Aulacaspis scale, the Guam population may become critically endangered.

== Threats ==
The cycad aulacaspis scale (CAS), an invasive species from Southeast Asia, poses a significant threat to Cycas micronesica, resulting in substantial plant mortality. However, the current plant mortality is not solely due to the scale. The introduction of the cycad blue butterfly in 2005 and the intensified damage caused by pre-existing arthropod pests are additional severe threats to the already weakened cycad population. Longhorn beetles, especially Acalolepta marianarum, are responsible for many recent plant deaths due to stem damage. Moreover, the invasive snail Satsuma mercatoria, has only recently been noted to be feeding on young leaflets. This change in herbivore behavior may be a result of the compromised ability of unhealthy cycad plants to synthesize chemicals that deter herbivores.

== Gallery ==
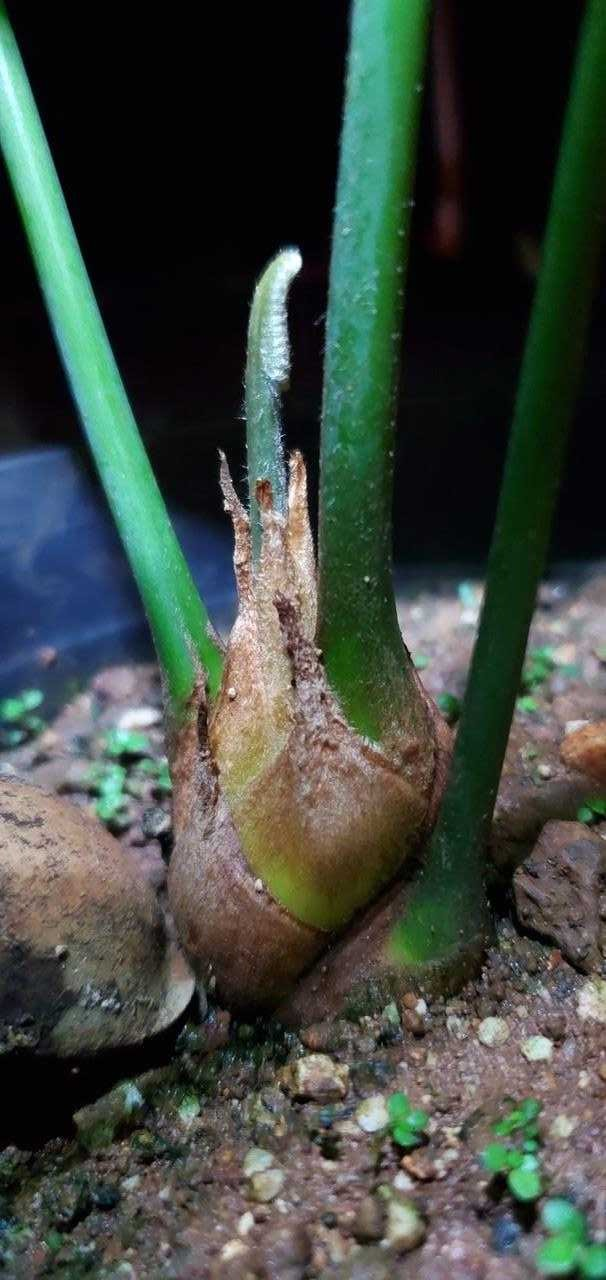
Young stem covered in cataphylls, with new leaf emerging

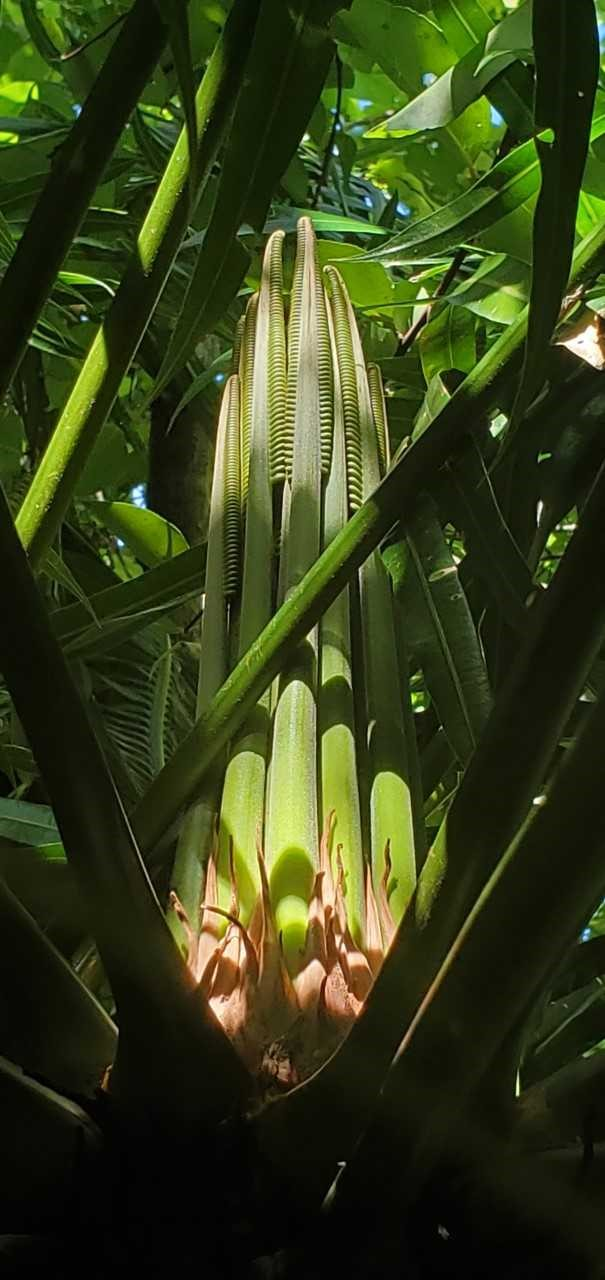
Emerging stems

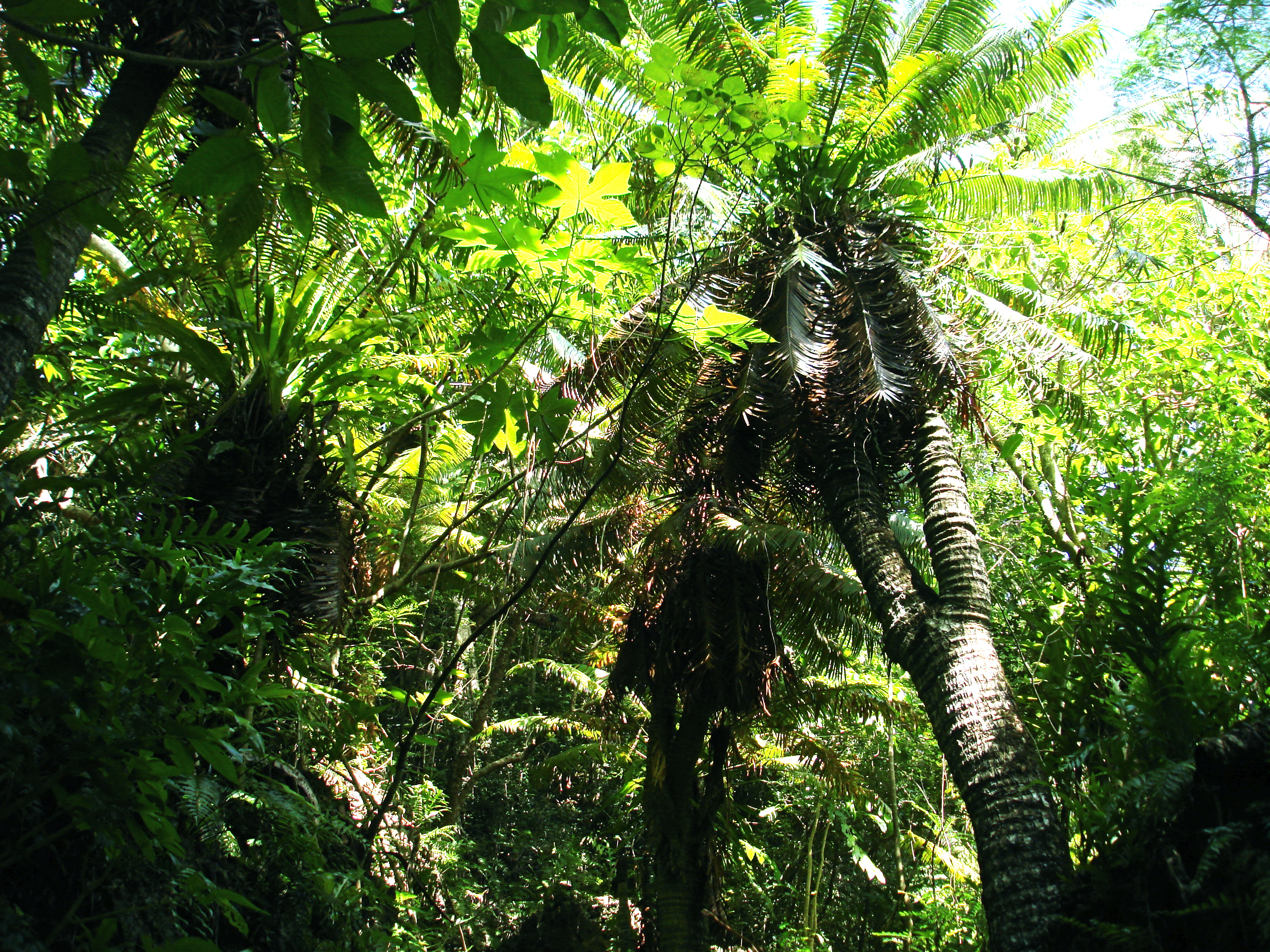
Understory habitation

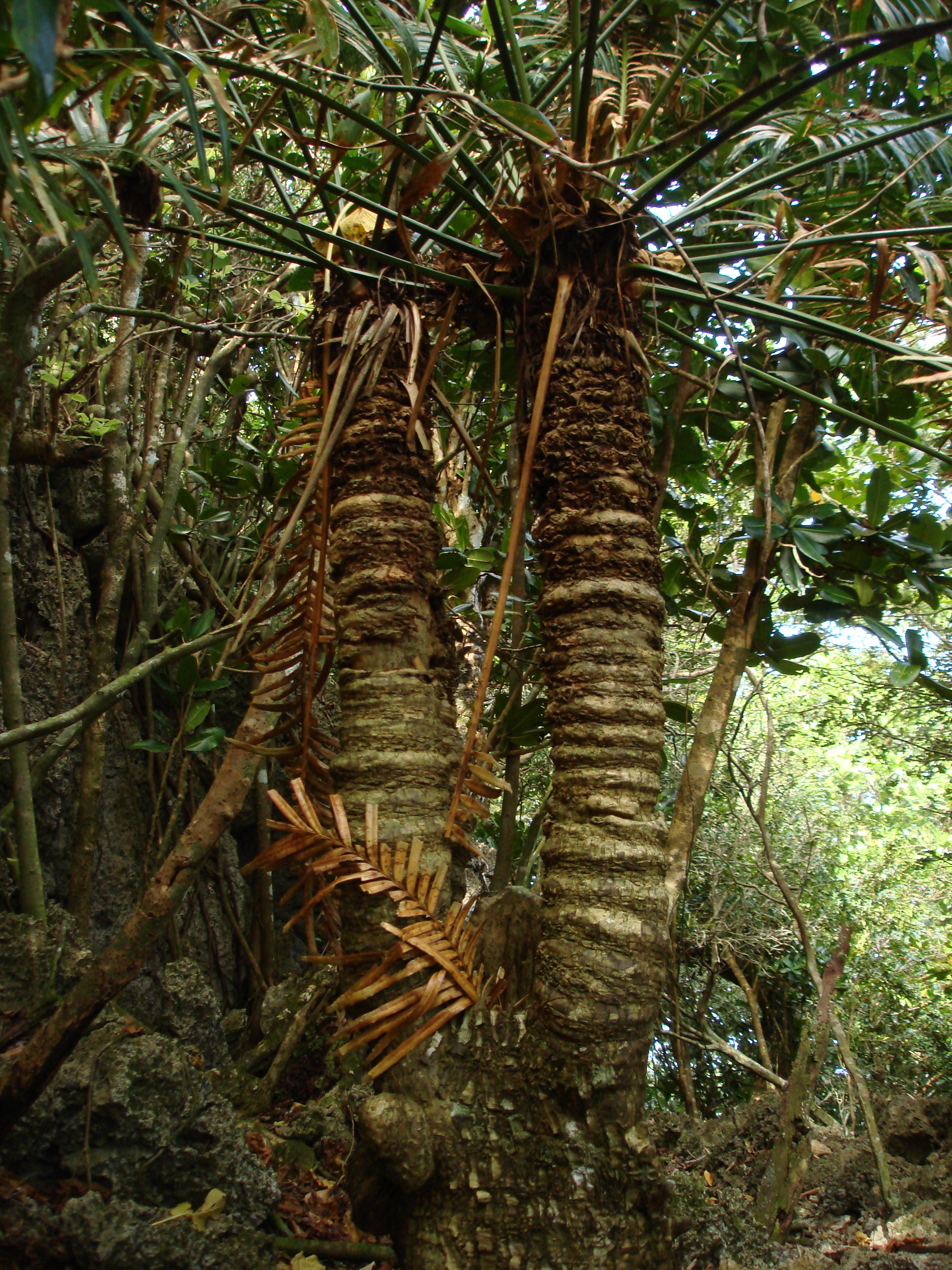
Stem and palm-like structure

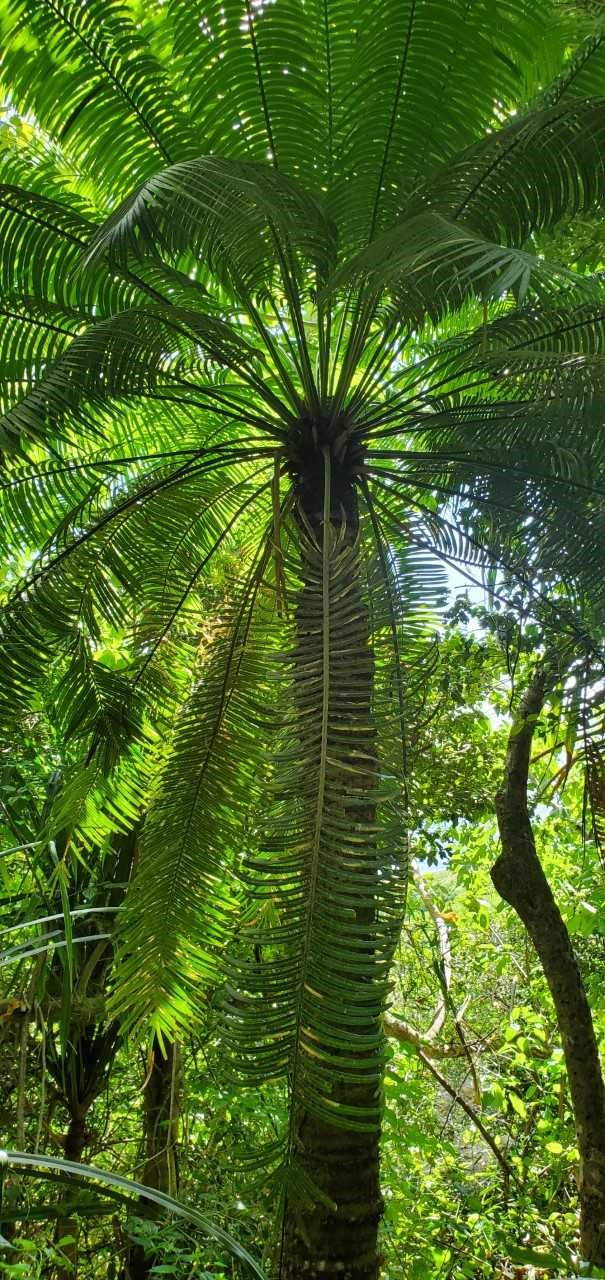
Crown

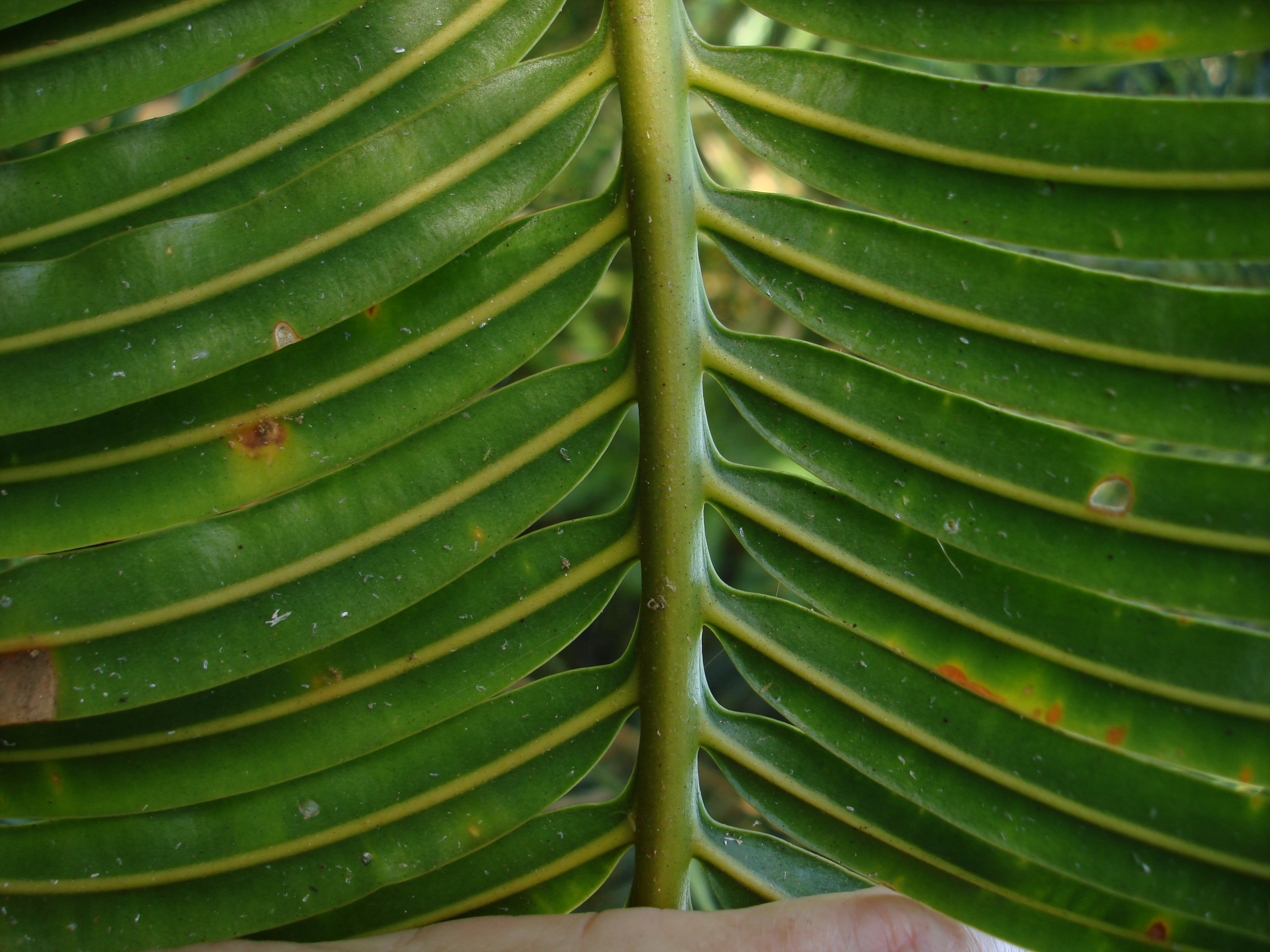
Pinnate leaf formation
