= Sago palm =

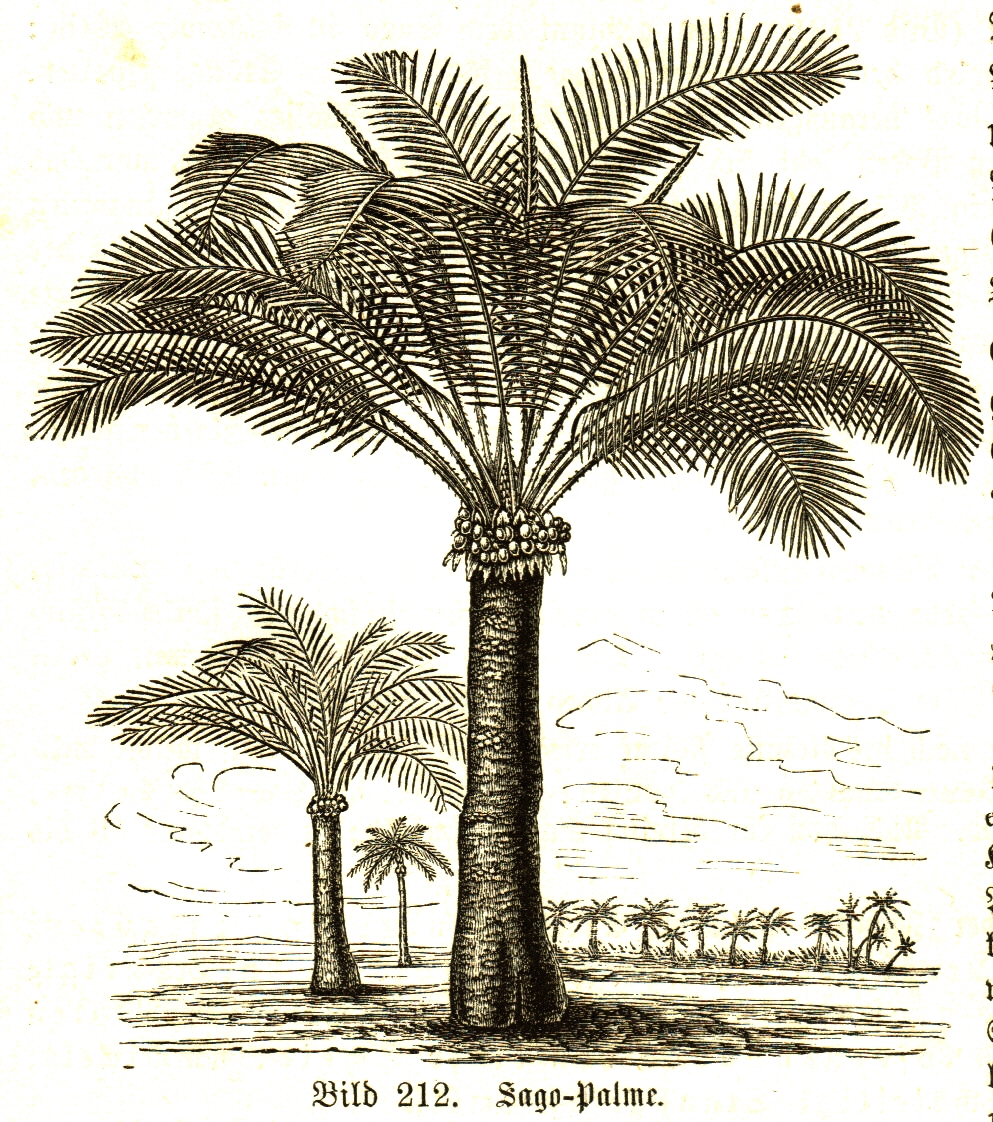
Sago palm

Sago palm is a common name for several plants which are used to produce a starchy food known as sago. Plants called sago palm include:

- Cycads
  - Cycas revoluta, (king sago palm), native to Japan and widely cultivated as an ornamental plant and popular houseplant. This species is a significant cause of poisoning in pets, in which ingestion of even a few seeds may be fatal.
  - Cycas rumphii, (queen sago palm), native to southeast Asia
  - Cycas circinalis, (queen sago palm), native to India
- Metroxylon (true sago palms), a genus in the palm family (Arecacea) native to Southeast Asia
