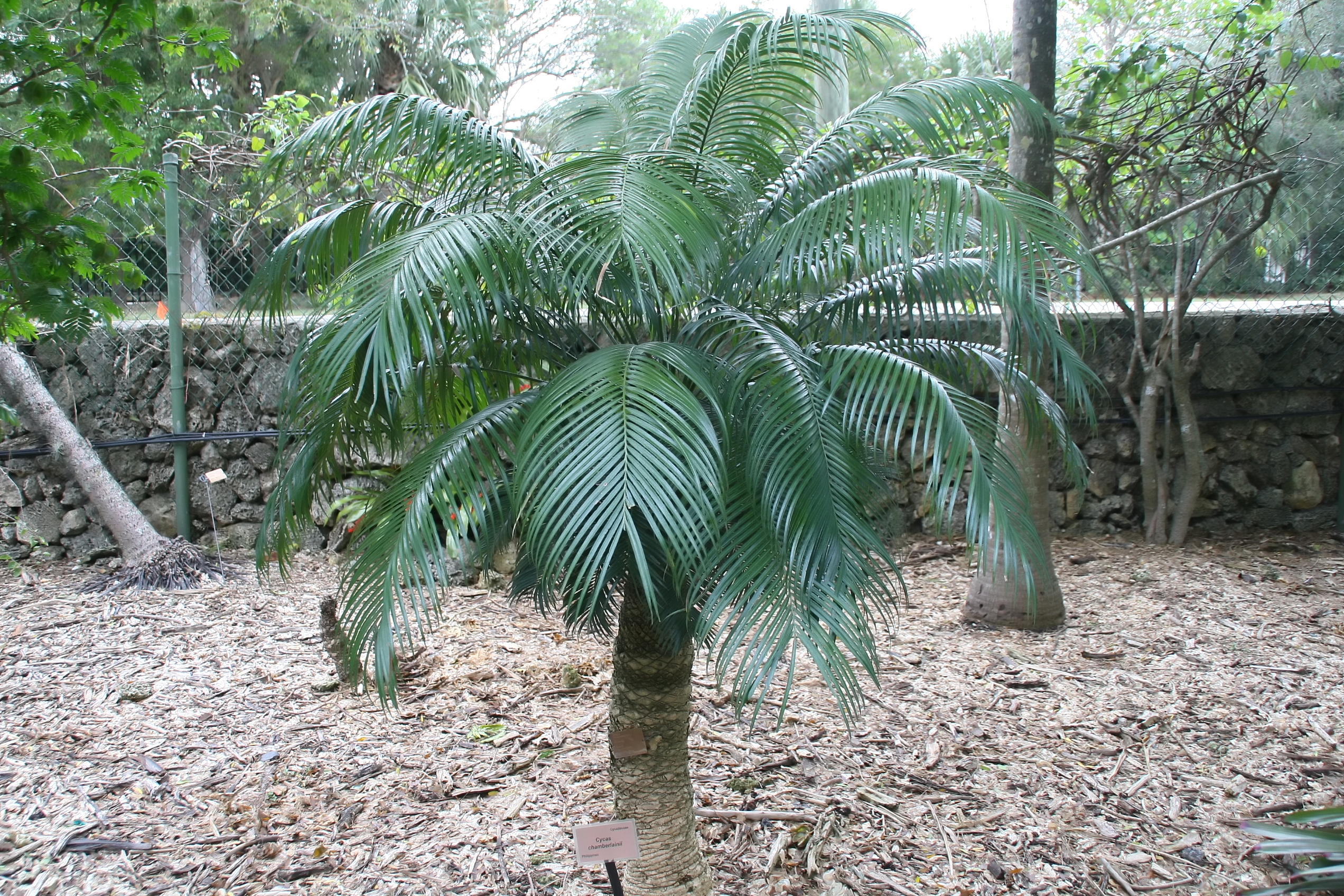

Conservation status
- Endangered (IUCN 3.1)

Scientific classification
- Kingdom: Plantae
- Clade: Embryophytes
- Clade: Tracheophytes
- Clade: Gymnosperms
- Division: Cycadophyta
- Class: Cycadopsida
- Order: Cycadales
- Family: Cycadaceae
- Genus: Cycas
- Species: C. riuminiana

Binomial name
- Cycas riuminiana M.Porte ex Regel

Synonyms
- Cycas circinalis ssp. riuminiana (Porte ex Regel) J. Schust.; Cycas chamberlainii W.H. Brown & Kienholz

= Cycas riuminiana =

Species of plant

Cycas riuminiana, commonly known as the Arayat pitogo or simply pitogo, is a species of cycad endemic to Luzon, Philippines. It is also locally known as bayit in Tagalog and sawang in Ilocano, among other names.

== Distribution ==
There are five subpopulations of Cycas riuminiana.

- Pampanga province, near Mount Arayat
- Bataan province, near Morong and Bagac
- Batangas province, near Lobo
- Isabela province, near Mount Dipalayag
- Aurora province, near Baler

== Uses ==
Young curled-up fronds of C. riuminiana are edible and can be cooked as vegetables. The ripe seeds are poisonous, but they can be crushed and soaked in water several times to remove the toxins before being dried and processed into a flour-like substance used for making small cakes or gruels.

== See also ==
- Cycas circinalis
- Cycas rumphii
