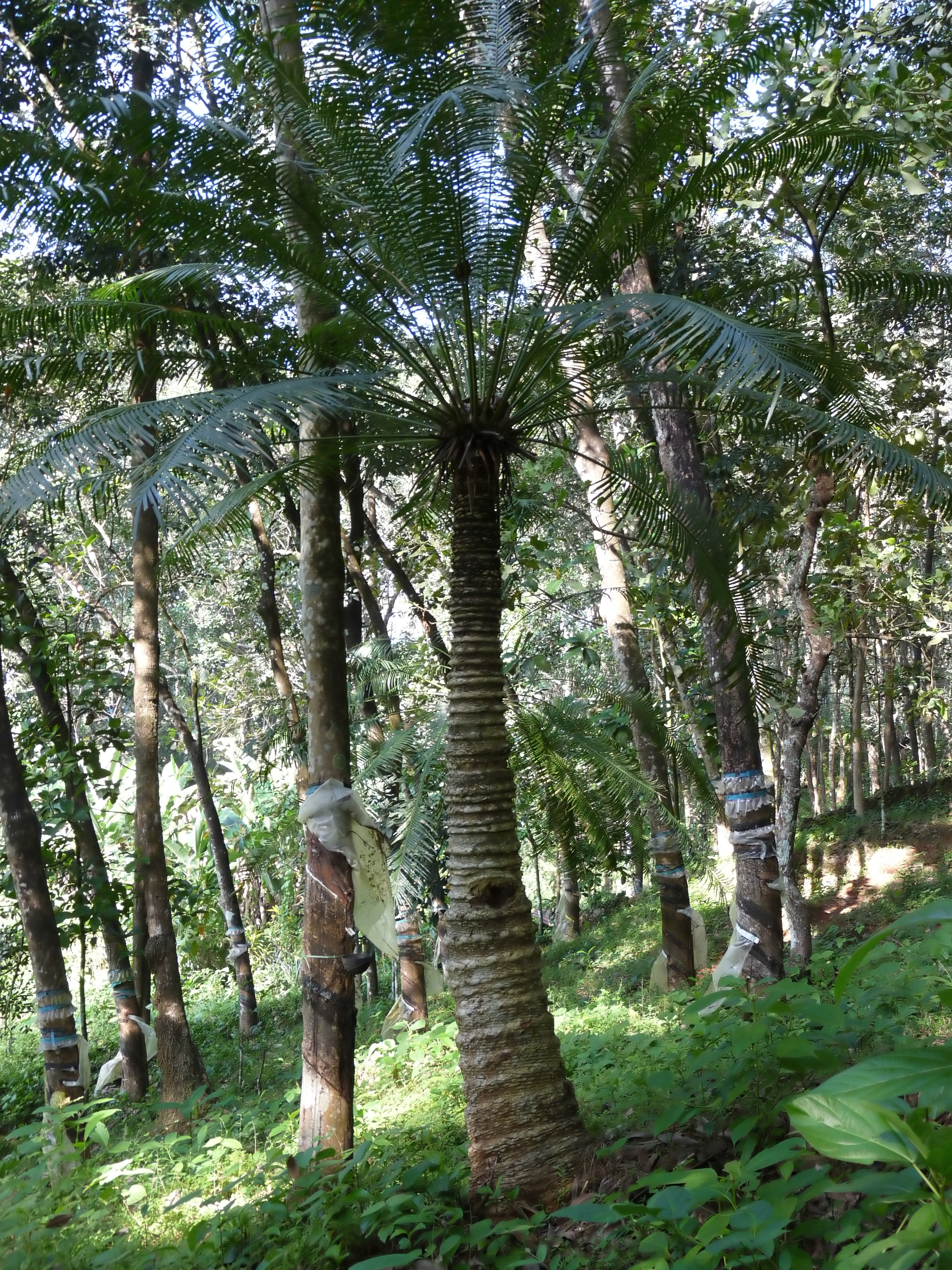
- In Kerala

Conservation status
- Endangered (IUCN 3.1)

Scientific classification
- Kingdom: Plantae
- Clade: Tracheophytes
- Clade: Gymnospermae
- Division: Cycadophyta
- Class: Cycadopsida
- Order: Cycadales
- Family: Cycadaceae
- Genus: Cycas
- Species: C. circinalis

Binomial name
- Cycas circinalis L.

= Cycas circinalis =

Queen sago

Species of cycad

Cycas circinalis, also known as the queen sago, is a species of cycad known in the wild only from southern India. Cycas circinalis is the only gymnosperm species found among native Sri Lankan flora.

== Taxonomy ==
C. circinallis is native to southern India and Sri Lanka, but the species name was formerly widely used for similar cycads in Southeast Asia, which leads to confusion in modern sources. The specimens described as "C. circinallis" in Indonesia and New Guinea are now recognized as Cycas rumphii; while the taxon formerly described as the subspecies C. circinallis ssp. riuminiana from the Philippines is now regarded as a separate species, Cycas riuminiana.

== Cultivation ==
The plant is widely cultivated in Hawaii, both for its appearance in landscape and interiors, and for cut foliage.

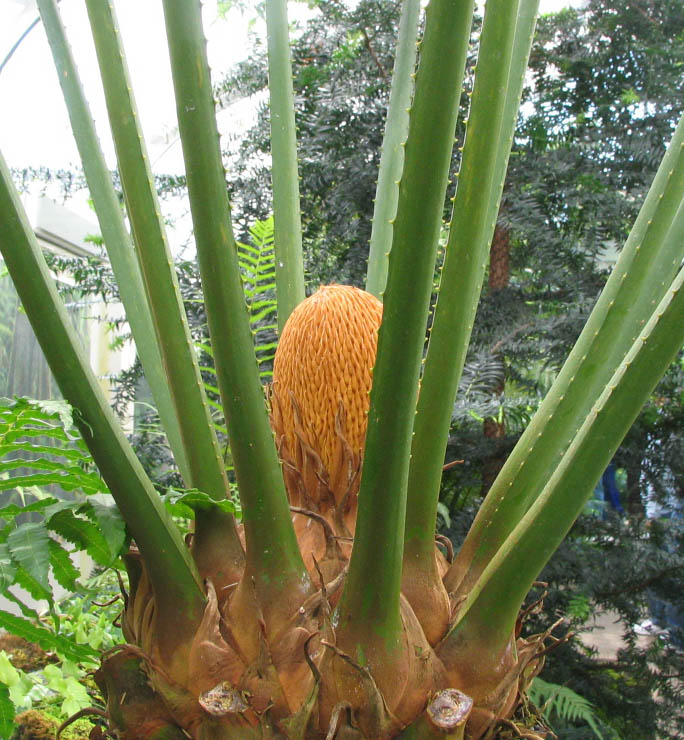
Male cone, new

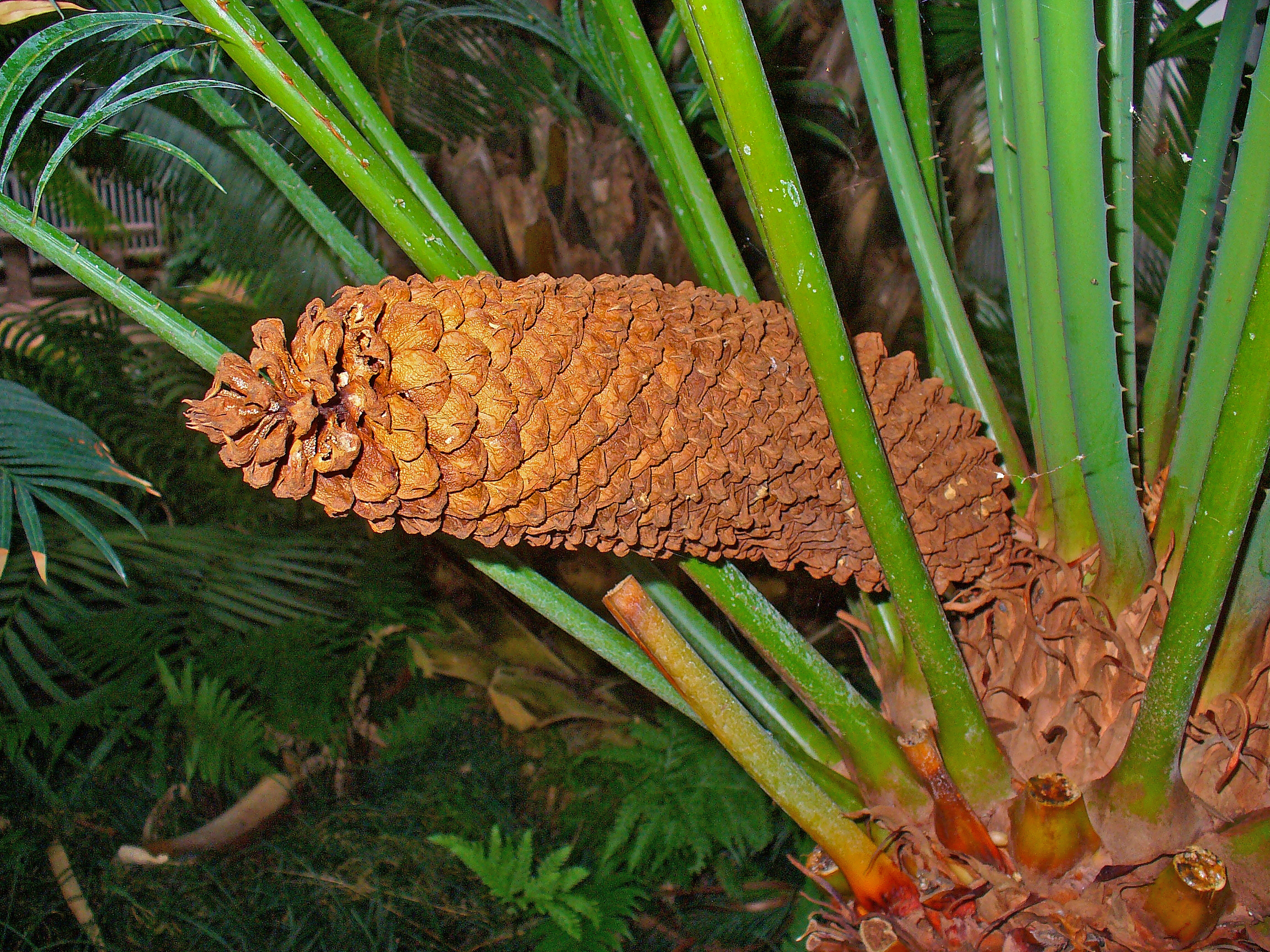
Male cone, old

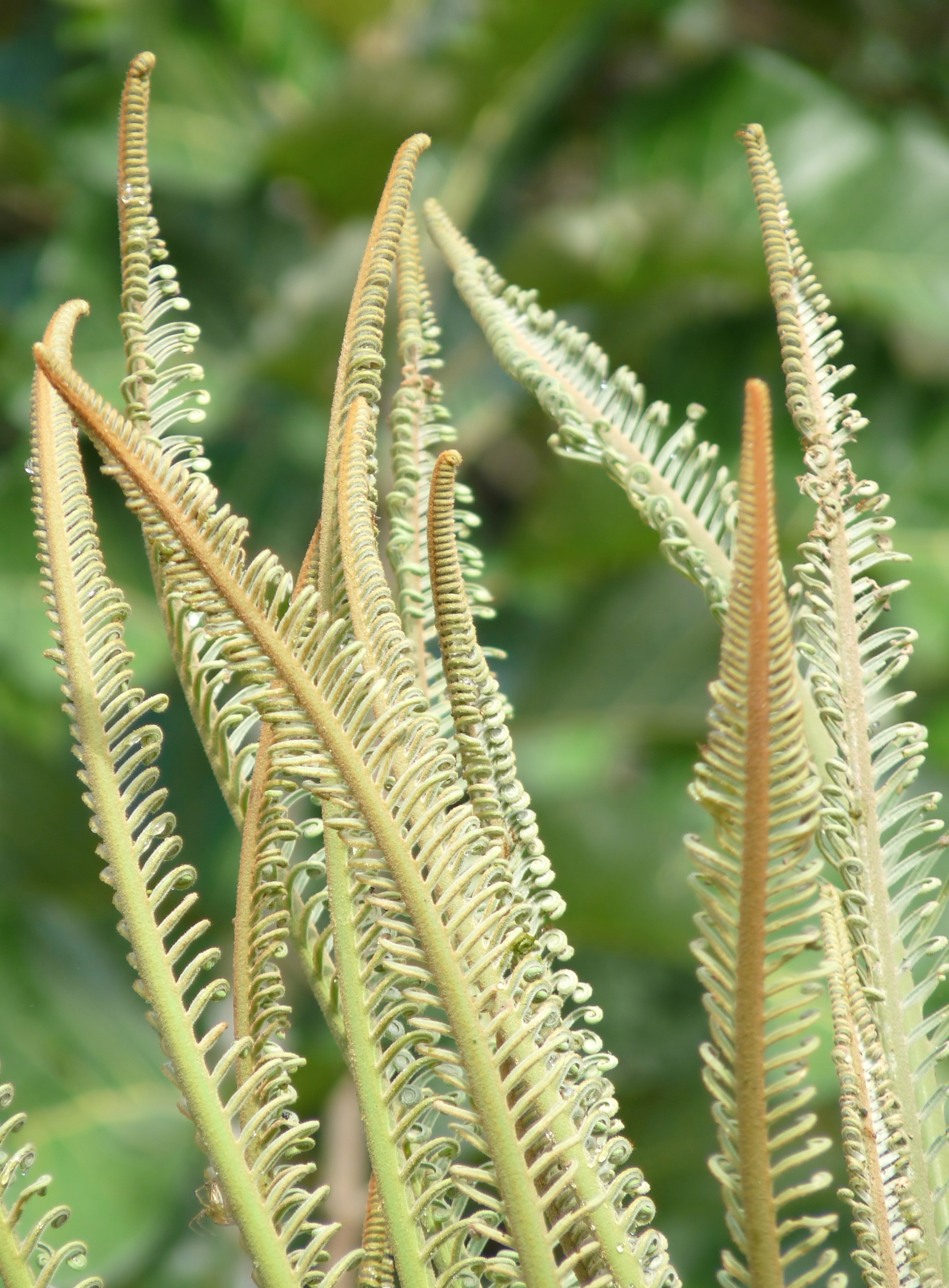
Young shoots

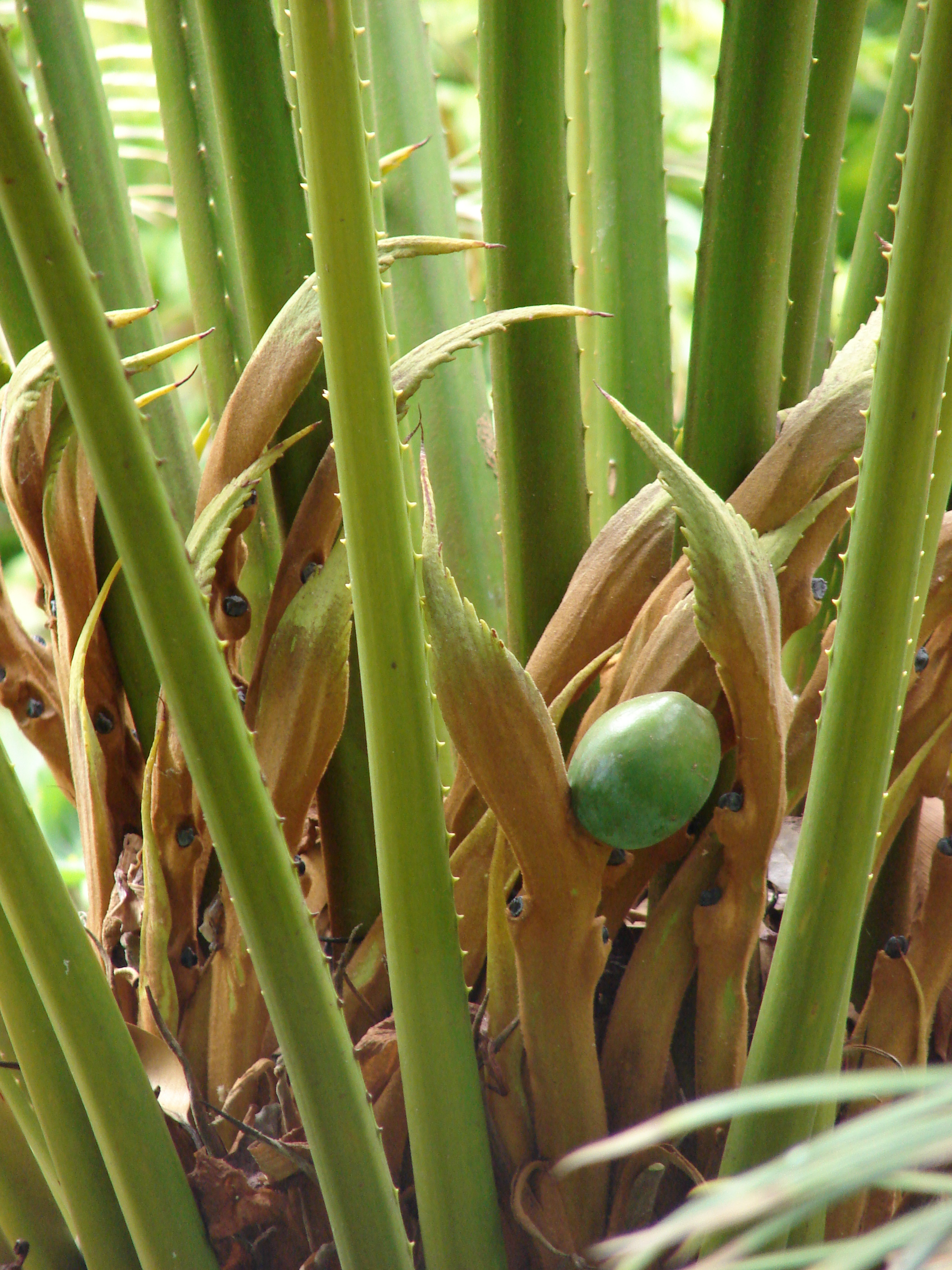
Seed

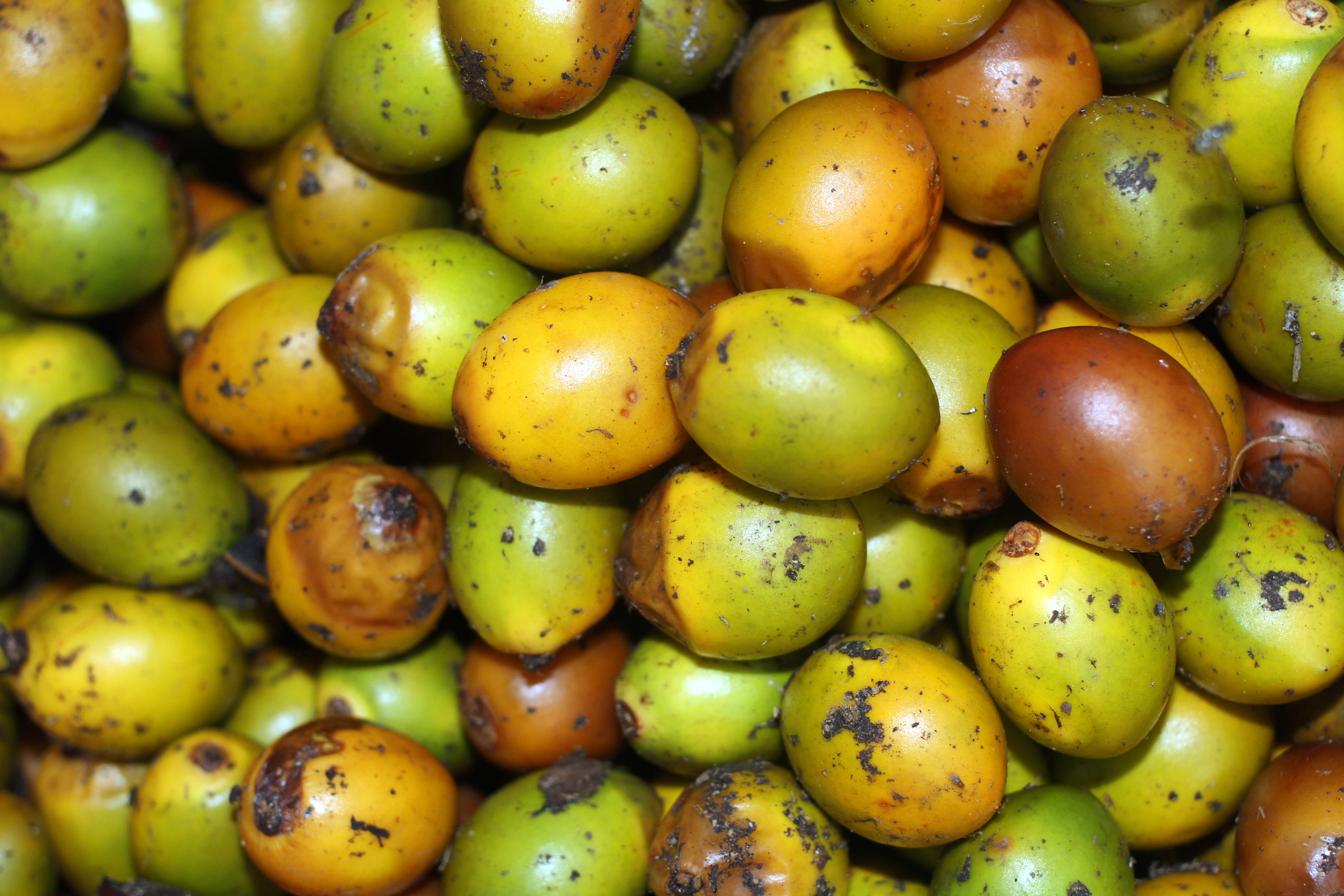
Collected seeds

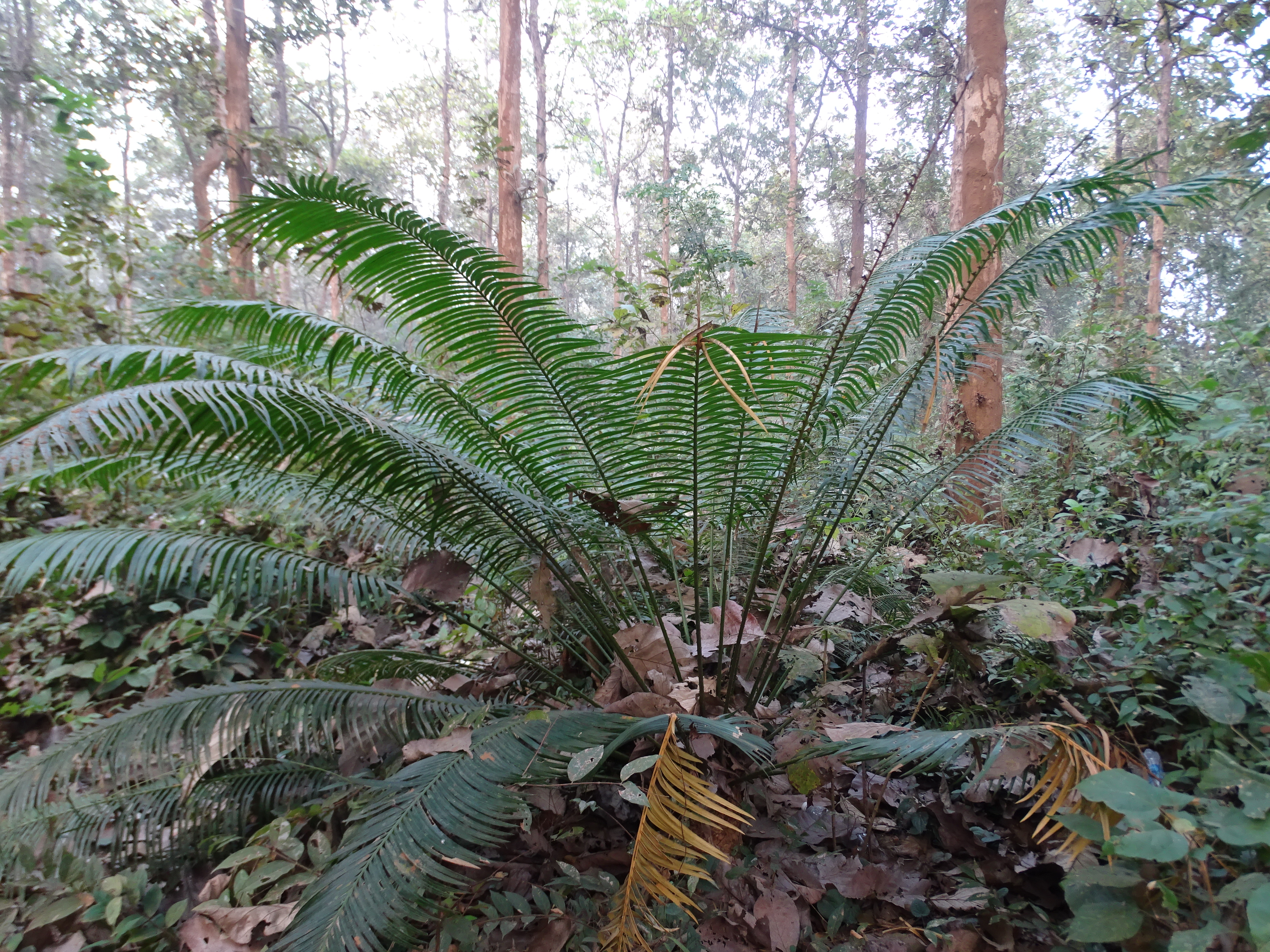
Young plant as seen in forest

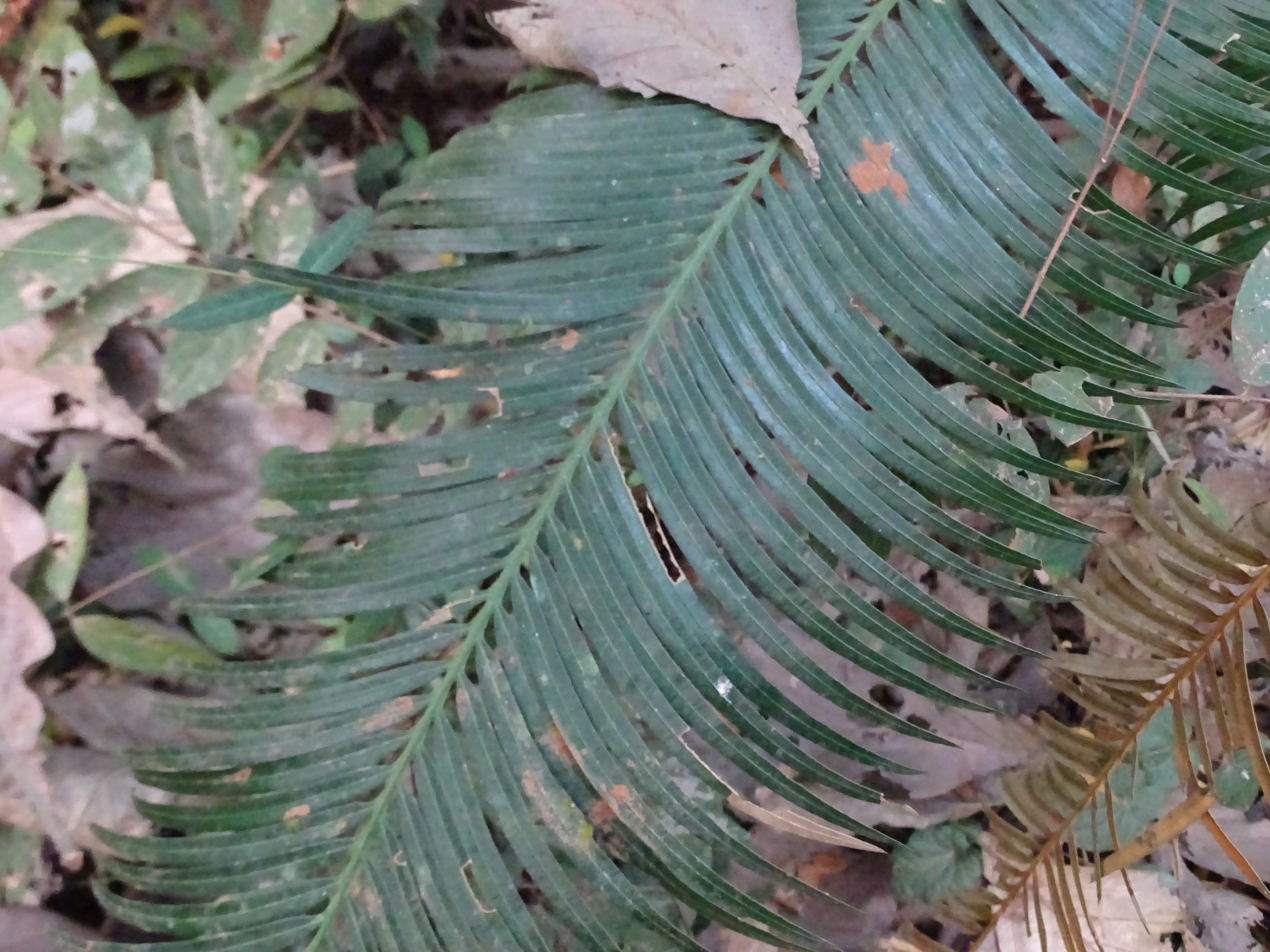
Leaf

== Use as food ==
The seed is poisonous. The potent poison in the seeds is removed by soaking them in water. Water from the first seed-soaking will kill birds, goats, sheep and hogs. Water from the following soakings is said to be harmless. [Minimum of 5 Soakings needed to ensure the safety]

After the final soaking, the seeds are dried and ground into flour. The flour is used to make tortillas, tamales, soup and porridge.

== Lytico-bodig disease ==
The plant was thought to be linked with the degenerative disease lytico-bodig on the island of Guam; however, the cycad native to Guam has since been recognised as a separate species, Cycas micronesica, by K.D. Hill in 1994.

== Chemistry ==
Leaflets of C. circinalis contain biflavonoids such as (2S, 2′′S)-2,3,2′′,3′′-tetrahydro-4′,4′′′-di-O-methylamentoflavone (tetrahydroisoginkgetin).
