= Acalolepta marianarum =

Scientific classification
- Domain: Eukaryota
- Kingdom: Animalia
- Phylum: Arthropoda
- Class: Insecta
- Order: Coleoptera
- Suborder: Polyphaga
- Infraorder: Cucujiformia
- Family: Cerambycidae
- Tribe: Lamiini
- Genus: Acalolepta
- Species: A. marianarum

Binomial name
- Acalolepta marianarum (Aurivillius, 1908)

Synonyms
- Dihammus marianarum (Aurivillius) Aurivillius, 1922; Dihammus ohzui Ohbayashi, 1941; Monochamus (Haplohammus) marianarum Aurivillius, 1908

Species of beetle

Acalolepta marianarum is a species of beetle in the family Cerambycidae. It was described by Per Olof Christopher Aurivillius in 1908, originally under the genus Monochamus. It is known from the Mariana Islands. It feeds on Theobroma cacao, Mangifera indica, and Artocarpus altilis.
