= Lytico-bodig disease =

Lytico-Bodig disease
- Other names: Guam disease, amyotrophic lateral sclerosis-parkinsonism-dementia, ALS-PDC, Guam ALS, Western Pacific ALS-PDC
- Specialty: Neurology
- Usual onset: Any age
- Duration: Lifelong upon symptom onset
- Causes: Unknown, but long term β-N-methylamino-L-alanine (BMAA) exposure has proposed as a cause.
- Diagnostic method: Based on symptoms, brain imaging, post-mortem diagnosis
- Differential diagnosis: Alzheimer's disease, Parkinson's disease, amyotrophic lateral sclerosis, parkinsonism, multiple sclerosis
- Treatment: Supportive care and pain management
- Medication: Carbidopa/levodopa
- Prognosis: Life expectancy highly variable but typically 2–4 years after diagnosis

Lytico-Bodig (also Lytigo-bodig) disease, Guam disease, amyotrophic lateral sclerosis-parkinsonism-dementia complex (ALS-PDC), and Western Pacific amyotrophic lateral sclerosis-parkinsonism-dementia complex is a rare, terminal neurodegenerative disease of uncertain etiology endemic to the Chamorro people of the island of Guam in Micronesia. Lytigo and bodig are Chamorro language words for two different manifestations of the same condition. ALS-PDC, a term coined by Asao Hirano and colleagues in 1961, reflects its resemblance to amyotrophic lateral sclerosis (ALS), Parkinson's disease, and Alzheimer's disease.

First reports of the disease surfaced in three death certificates on Guam in 1904 which made some mention of paralysis. The frequency of cases grew amongst the Chamorro until it was the leading cause of adult death between 1945 and 1956. The incidence rate was 200 per 100,000 per year and it was 100 times more prevalent than in the rest of the world. Neurologist Oliver Sacks detailed this disease in his book The Island of the Colorblind. Sacks and Paul Alan Cox subsequently wrote that bats had been feeding on Federico nuts (Cycas micronesica) and concentrating β-methylamino-L-alanine (BMAA), a known neurotoxin, in their body fat. The hypothesis suggests that consumption of the bats by the Chamorro exposed them to BMAA, contributing to or causing their condition. Decline in consumption of the bats has been linked to a decline in the incidence of the disease.

== Symptoms and signs ==
Lytico-bodig disease presents itself in two ways:

- Lytico is a cortical degeneration that resembles amyotrophic lateral sclerosis (ALS) and frontotemporal degeneration.
- Bodig is a subcortical degeneration resembling parkinsonism and progressive supranuclear palsy (PSP).

=== Lytico ===
As with bodig, the symptoms and forms of lytico present themselves differently from patient to patient. Patient presentations include muscle atrophy, maxillofacial paralysis, inability to speak or swallow and subsequent choking. Some patients retain mental lucidity throughout the illness until death, much like ALS patients.

Diaphragm and respiratory accessory muscles can become paralyzed, necessitating mechanical ventilation to facilitate breathing. Saliva must be suctioned from the mouth to prevent aspiration. This form of lytico-bodig is fatal in all cases.

=== Bodig ===
No standard form of bodig has been reported and the documented cases of the disease manifested in many different clinical presentations.

The doctor visited a patient who had just suddenly come down with a virulent form. His symptoms had begun 18 months before, starting with a strange immobility and a loss of initiative and spontaneity; he found he had to make a huge effort to walk, to stand, and to make the least movement—his body was disobedient. The immobility attacked with frightening speed, and within a year, he was unable to stand alone and could not control his posture (1996).

—Oliver Sacks, The Island of the Colorblind, Knopf, 1996

Progressive dementia is also characteristic of bodig. Those who experience dementia are often aphasic and restless, and demonstrate irrational behavior, such as violence, and deep emotions at odd intervals. Patients experience manic highs and lows, giggling one minute and screaming the next.

Patients in the most virulent stage present with mouths hanging open, with excessive salivation; their tongues hang motionless, rendering speech and swallowing impossible. The patient's arms and legs become severely spastic and bent in immovable tension.

The advanced progression presents as profound motionlessness, or catatonia, accompanied with tremors or rigidity. Except in cases with concurrent dementia, most patients are capable of lucid thought and speech throughout the disease's physical progression.

== Cause ==
Some hypotheses as to the cause of the disease include genetics, cycad seeds, and ingested beta-Methylamino-L-alanine (BMAA) from the consumption of fruit bats.

=== Genetic hypothesis ===
Genetics was first hypothesized due to the situation on Guam. Lytico-bodig was found in great numbers among members of the Chamorro community, so genetic factors were possible. The disease was shown to be familial but not genetic. Chamorro who grew up outside of Guam had not developed the disease, and some non-Chamorro who moved to the island and followed the culture did develop it. Targeted high-throughput sequencing in a relatively small sample demonstrates that disease in many patients can be explained by pathogenic mutations in known genes for neurodegeneration. This includes parkinsonism-dementia due to PINK1 homozygous mutations, a DCTN1 mutation that may be causal for Perry syndrome, Huntington's disease due to HTT [CAG] expansions, and FUS and ALS2 mutations.

=== Cycad hypothesis ===
The starch from indigenous Cycas micronesica seeds is consumed in the traditional Chamorro diet. The seeds are ground to make a flour called fadang, and the flour is then used to make flatbread and dumplings. The flour is soaked and washed several times, as the seed in its natural form is extremely toxic. Ample research on the cycad hypothesis found a component of the seeds, cycasin, was a potent toxin; it was discovered in the 1950s. As toxic as it was, it was incapable of causing of the symptoms of lytico-bodig. Not only that, after nearly two decades of NIH-funded research, animal models failed to reproduce chronic Lytico-Bodig, and the hypothesis was rejected for the first time.

In 1967, following studies that linked lathyrism to ODAP, Marjorie Whiting, a nutritional anthropologist, asked Arthur Bell, a plant biochemist, to test cycad seeds for their chemical constituents. Bell and his colleagues discovered another toxic substance in the seeds, BMAA (beta-Methylamino-L-alanine). Initial laboratory results found low levels of free BMAA in cycad flour. The cycad hypothesis was abandoned a second time, because the acute toxicity shown by Spencer and colleagues was due to BMAA concentrations orders of magnitude higher. Further laboratory analysis, which included protein-bound BMAA, found significant levels in fadang; the levels were higher in fadang made at settlements with a higher incidence of lytico-bodig.

=== Flying fox (Fruit bat) hypothesis ===
The cycad hypothesis was resurrected by Paul Alan Cox and Oliver Sacks, after re-examining aspects of the Chamorro diet. Cox and his colleagues found that BMAA is produced by symbiotic cyanobacteria found in the coralloid roots of cycads. Other than that, fruit bats or flying foxes feed on cycad seeds, and were a common food for the Chamorros. The bats bioaccumulate BMAA in their fat, and eating even a few bats would cause a dose of BMAA similar to levels that produced disease symptoms in the earlier animal models. The content of free BMAA in fruit bats was up to 3 mg/g (approximately 30 mM), while that in the broth in which the fruit bats had been cooked was up to 3 mg/250 ml. Cox also observed decline in fruit bat consumption matching the decline in lytico-bodig. Support for the BMAA theory of the Guam disease came from the finding reported in 2016 that chronic dietary exposure of vervet monkeys homozygous for the APOE4 gene (which in humans increases risk of Alzheimer's disease) to the cyanobacterial toxin BMAA produces dense neurofibrillary tangles and sparse amyloid plaques similar to that found in the brains of Chamorro villagers in Guam who died from lytico-bodig. BMAA consumption and chronic exposure has been associated with rare clusters of ALS-like cases in the Kii Peninsula of Japan and Mascoma Lake in Enfield, New Hampshire.

== Mechanism ==
The mechanism is complex and poorly understood. During autopsies, neurofibrillary tangles (NFTs) are found in the brain which are congruent to the brain of an Alzheimer's patient.

The following is an excerpt from Island of the Colorblind, in which samples of substantia nigra are viewed under microscope. "Many of the cells are pale and depigmented. There's a lot of glial reaction, and bits of loose pigment. Shifting to a higher power, he saw a huge number of neurofibrillary tangles, densely staining, convoluted masses, harshly evident within the destroyed nerve cells." Looking at other samples of hypothalamus, spinal cord, and cortex, all were full of neurofibrillary tangles. Neurofibrillary degeneration was everywhere. These slides were similar in appearance to those taken from postencephalitic parkinsonism.

While neurofibrillary degeneration is a potential cause of lytico-bodig, much is still undiscovered as to what causes the symptoms, what governs the severity, and how the onset of symptoms progresses. Similar symptoms of Postencephalitic Parkinsonism patients and Alzheimer's patients could account for the similarities in symptoms of lytico and bodig. Lytico-bodig, postencephalitis, and Alzheimer's could possibly be the same disease taking three different forms.

Age of onset seems to be increasing with no more teenage cases and almost no patients in their twenties. Presentation also varies between years. One form of the disease will present itself chiefly in one decade and then another form predominates in the next.

No treatment has been found to cure lytico-bodig. In some cases, the drug L-DOPA was given to patients to alleviate some of the symptoms of bodig, but this only gave the patients one or two hours of freedom from the complete paralysis and rigidity of limbs. It seems in the case of the Chamorros, family members are the primary caregivers, and they have accepted those who are ill and provide home care for all those inflicted with lytico-bodig.

== See also ==
- β-Methylamino-L-alanine (BMAA)
- Kuru (disease)
- Lathyrism
