= Teruya =

Teruya (written: 照屋) is a Japanese surname. Notable people with the surname include:

- Kantoku Teruya (照屋 寛徳; 1945–2022), Japanese member of the Social Democratic Party
- Kanzen Teruya (照屋 寛善; 1920–2004), Japanese physician
- Yuken Teruya (照屋 勇賢; born 1973), Japanese artist
- Weston Teruya, (born 1977) Oakland-based visual artist and arts administrator
- Teruya Goto (後藤 輝也; born 1991), Japanese rugby sevens player
