= Morelloflavone =

Names
- IUPAC name (3′,4′,5,7-Tetrahydroxyflavone)-(8→3)-[(2R,3S)-4′,5,7-trihydroxyflavan-4-one]
- Systematic IUPAC name (2R,3S)-2′-(3,4-Dihydroxyphenyl)-5,5′,7,7′-tetrahydroxy-2-(4-hydroxyphenyl)-2,3-dihydro-4H,4′H-[3,8′-bi-1-benzopyran]-4,4′-dione

Identifiers
CAS Number	16851-21-1
3D model (JSmol)	Interactive image
ChEBI	CHEBI:70331
ChemSpider	4576660
PubChem CID	5464454
UNII	AX3GA2TK7M
CompTox Dashboard (EPA)	DTXSID60168574
- InChI: InChI=1S/C30H20O11/c31-14-4-1-12(2-5-14)29-27(28(39)25-18(35)8-15(32)9-23(25)41-29)26-20(37)10-19(36)24-21(38)11-22(40-30(24)26)13-3-6-16(33)17(34)7-13/h1-11,27,29,31-37H/t27-,29+/m0/s1 Key: GFWPWSNIXRDQJC-LMSSTIIKSA-N; InChI=1/C30H20O11/c31-14-4-1-12(2-5-14)29-27(28(39)25-18(35)8-15(32)9-23(25)41-29)26-20(37)10-19(36)24-21(38)11-22(40-30(24)26)13-3-6-16(33)17(34)7-13/h1-11,27,29,31-37H/t27-,29+/m0/s1 Key: GFWPWSNIXRDQJC-LMSSTIIKBX
- SMILES: c1cc(ccc1[C@@H]2[C@H](C(=O)c3c(cc(cc3O2)O)O)c4c(cc(c5c4oc(cc5=O)c6ccc(c(c6)O)O)O)O)O

Properties
Chemical formula	C_{30}H_{20}O_{11}
Molar mass	556.479 g·mol^{−1}
- Except where otherwise noted, data are given for materials in their standard state (at 25 °C [77 °F], 100 kPa). Infobox references

Morelloflavone, an isolate of Garcinia dulcis, belongs to the family of biflavonoids and is an inhibitor of HMG-CoA reductase.
