= Kolaflavanone =

Kola nut flavanone

Identifiers
- IUPAC name: (2R,3R)-8-[(2S,3R)-5,7-dihydroxy-2-(4-hydroxyphenyl)-4-oxo-2,3-dihydrochromen-3-yl]-3,5,7-trihydroxy-2-(3-hydroxy-4-methoxyphenyl)-2,3-dihydrochromen-4-one
- CAS Number: 68705-66-8 97560-11-7
- PubChem CID: 155169
- ChemSpider: 136697
- UNII: VY4E467596
- KEGG: C09761
- ChEBI: CHEBI:28521
- ChEMBL: ChEMBL4794351
- CompTox Dashboard (EPA): DTXSID80243039

Chemical and physical data
- Formula: C_{31}H_{24}O_{12}
- Molar mass: 588.521 g·mol^{−1}
- 3D model (JSmol): Interactive image
- SMILES: COC1=C(C=C(C=C1)[C@@H]2[C@H](C(=O)C3=C(C=C(C(=C3O2)[C@@H]4[C@H](OC5=CC(=CC(=C5C4=O)O)O)C6=CC=C(C=C6)O)O)O)O)O COC1=C(C=C(C=C1)[C@@H]2[C@H](C(=O)C3=C(C=C(C(=C3O2)[C@@H]4[C@H](OC5=CC(=CC(=C5C4=O)O)O)C6=CC=C(C=C6)O)O)O)O)O
- InChI: InChI=1S/C31H24O12/c1-41-20-7-4-13(8-16(20)34)30-28(40)27(39)24-19(37)11-18(36)23(31(24)43-30)25-26(38)22-17(35)9-15(33)10-21(22)42-29(25)12-2-5-14(32)6-3-12/h2-11,25,28-30,32-37,40H,1H3/t25-,28-,29+,30+/m0/s1; Key:GJWXCPDVDRIBKP-CNTBMXMRSA-N

Kolaflavanone is a biflavonoid isolated from the nuts of Garcinia kola. It has been reported to exhibit antioxidant, neuroprotective, antidiabetic, and reproductive protective effects in experimental models.

It shows antioxidant activity, including protection against gamma-radiation in animal models. Studies in Drosophila melanogaster suggest potential anti-Parkinson effects as well as increased longevity.

Kolaflavanone (as part of the biflavonoid fraction kolaviron) has also been investigated for protective effects against reproductive toxicity. Findings from animal studies suggest amelioration of chemically or radiation-induced reproductive damage, although vitamin E has shown similar protective effects. In vitro studies indicate that kolaflavanone may protect neuronal cell lines from toxic insults induced by the herbicide atrazine, a known endocrine-disrupting chemical. Kolaflavanone has further been reported to exert antidiabetic effects in experimental models.

Extraction methods for biflavonoids from Garcinia kola nuts, including kolaflavanone, have been described in patent literature.
