= Ochnaflavone =

Names
- IUPAC name (5,7-Dihydroxyflavone)-(4′-oxy-3′)-(4′,5,7-trihydroxyflavone)
- Systematic IUPAC name 2-{4-[5-(5,7-Dihydroxy-4-oxo-4H-1-benzopyran-2-yl)-2-hydroxyphenoxy]phenyl}-5,7-dihydroxy-4H-1-benzopyran-4-one

Identifiers
CAS Number	50276-96-5
3D model (JSmol)	Interactive image
ChEBI	CHEBI:194126
ChemSpider	4590862
PubChem CID	5492110
UNII	5B97Q9UZ5T
CompTox Dashboard (EPA)	DTXSID70198281
- InChI: InChI=1S/C30H18O10/c31-16-8-20(34)29-22(36)12-24(39-27(29)10-16)14-1-4-18(5-2-14)38-26-7-15(3-6-19(26)33)25-13-23(37)30-21(35)9-17(32)11-28(30)40-25/h1-13,31-35H Key: NNPGECDACGBKDH-UHFFFAOYSA-N; InChI=1/C30H18O10/c31-16-8-20(34)29-22(36)12-24(39-27(29)10-16)14-1-4-18(5-2-14)38-26-7-15(3-6-19(26)33)25-13-23(37)30-21(35)9-17(32)11-28(30)40-25/h1-13,31-35H Key: NNPGECDACGBKDH-UHFFFAOYAU
- SMILES: C1=CC(=CC=C1C2=CC(=O)C3=C(C=C(C=C3O2)O)O)OC4=C(C=CC(=C4)C5=CC(=O)C6=C(C=C(C=C6O5)O)O)O

Properties
Chemical formula	C_{30}H_{18}O_{10}
Molar mass	538.464 g·mol^{−1}
- Except where otherwise noted, data are given for materials in their standard state (at 25 °C [77 °F], 100 kPa). Infobox references

Ochnaflavone, a secondary plant secondary metabolite of the Biflavonoid family, has been widely investigated in past decades due to its unique ability to mediate biological activities, such as inhibition of phospholipase A2 and lymphocyte proliferation. It was first isolated from Ochna squarrosa Linn, a member of Ochnaceae family, in 1973.

== Synthesis ==
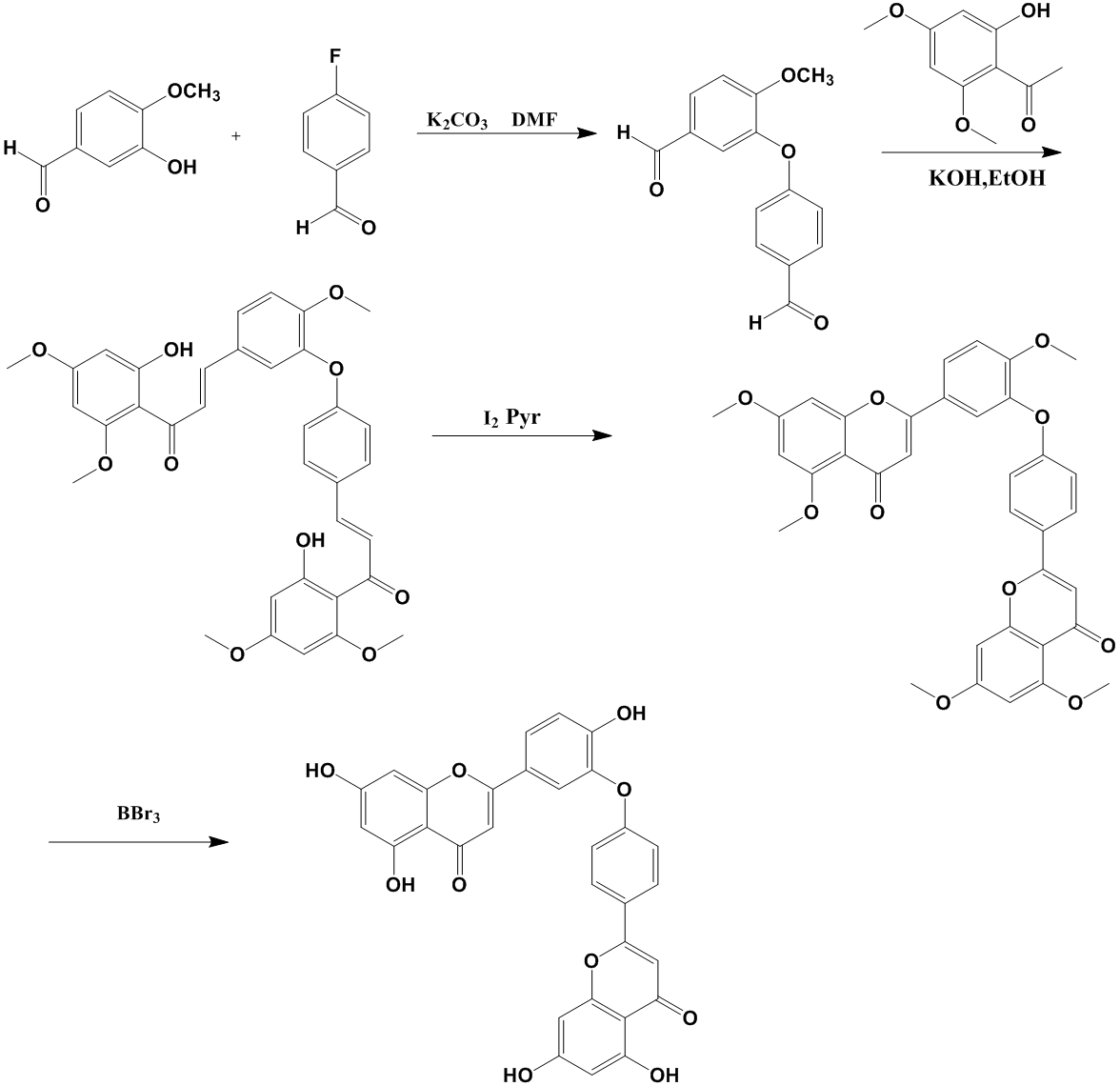
Synthesis of Ochnalfavone

The first total synthesis of ochnaflavone derivatives was achieved by Kawano group in 1973, followed by the Heerden group for the first time reporting the total synthesis the ochnaflavone by constructing a diaryl ether intermediate and assemble the two flavone nuclei through ring cyclization. To date, the field of biochemistry of biflavonoids is still wide open. Little is known about Ochnaflavone of its natural occurrence and biosynthesis.

== Activity ==
Although Ochnaflavone has not been fully studied in the past decades, its protective role in plants and human body already attract scientists’ much attention, such as anti-atherogenic activity and anti-inflammatory activity.

Anti-atherogenic activity: Atherogenesis refers to the formation of atheromas on arteries’ walls. It is believed that atherogenesis may be caused by an infection of the vascular smooth muscle cells. Find molecules that possess anti-proliferation activity of vascular smooth muscle cells seems a good strategy to treat Atherogenesis. In 2006, a research group from Korea found Ochnaflavone could inhibit tumor necrosis factor (TNF)-a-induced human vascular smooth muscle cells proliferation. It was achieved by the ability of Ochnaflavone to regulate the extracellular signal-regulated kinase 1/2, matrix metalloproteinase-9 and cell cycle.

Anti-inflammatory activity: Inflammation is a biological response to certain harmful stimuli. Phospholipase A2 (PLA2) is important in many inflammatory processes as it catalyses the release of arachidonic acid, which could generate lipid mediators of inflammation. Ochnaflavone is found to inhibit PLA2 by directly binding this enzyme irreversibly.
