= Garcinia afzelii =

Conservation status
- Vulnerable (IUCN 2.3)

Scientific classification
- Kingdom: Plantae
- Clade: Tracheophytes
- Clade: Angiosperms
- Clade: Eudicots
- Clade: Rosids
- Order: Malpighiales
- Family: Clusiaceae
- Genus: Garcinia
- Species: G. afzelii

Binomial name
- Garcinia afzelii Engl.

Synonyms
- Garcinia antidysenterica A.Chev.; Garcinia brevipedicellata (Baker f.) Hutch. & Dalziel; Garcinia mannii var. brevipedicellata Baker f.

Species of tree

Garcinia afzelii is a species of small to medium tree in the family Clusiaceae. It is native to west and west-central tropical Africa, ranging from Guinea to Ghana and from Nigeria to Cameroon, Gabon, Republic of the Congo, and the Central African Republic. It is sometimes called "bitter kola", but this name properly refers to G. kola.

It grows as an understory tree lowland tropical rain forest, riverine forest, and gallery forest, and at forest edges in the Upper Guinean forests, Lower Guinean forests, and western Congolian rainforests.
