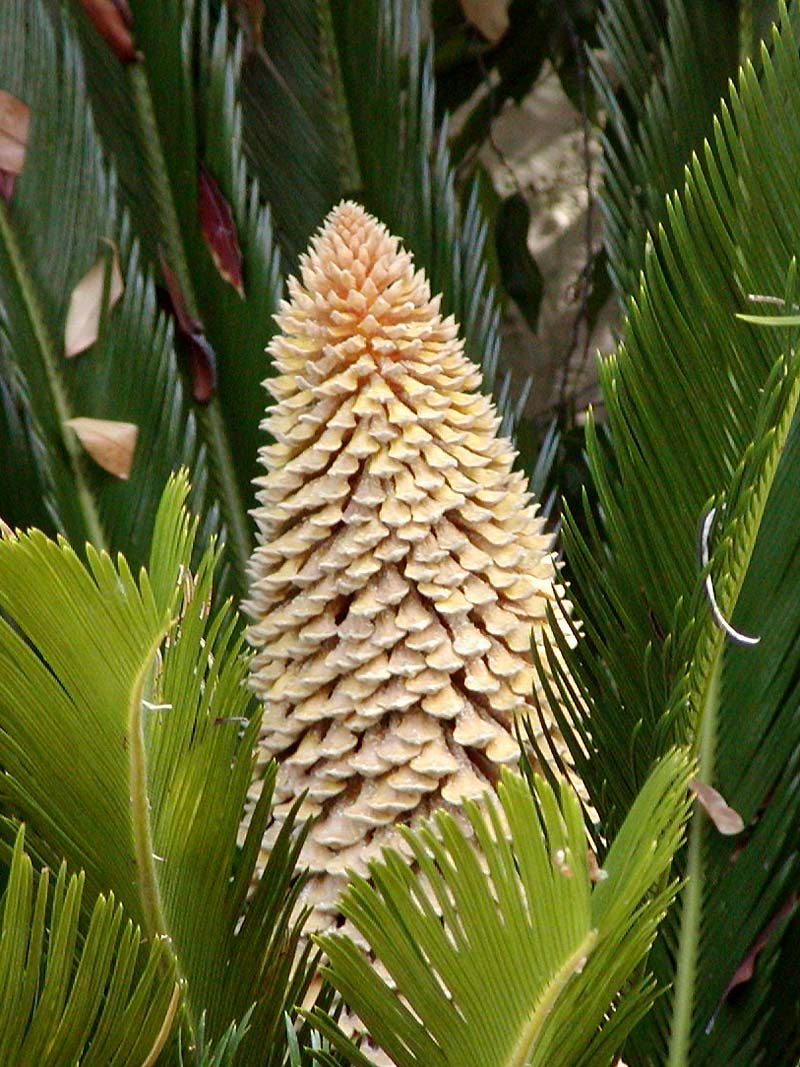
- Cycas revoluta male reproductive cone

Conservation status
- Least Concern (IUCN 3.1)
- CITES Appendix II

Scientific classification
- Kingdom: Plantae
- Clade: Embryophytes
- Clade: Tracheophytes
- Clade: Spermatophytes
- Clade: Gymnosperms
- Division: Cycadophyta
- Class: Cycadopsida
- Order: Cycadales
- Family: Cycadaceae
- Genus: Cycas
- Species: C. revoluta

Binomial name
- Cycas revoluta Thunb.

Synonyms
- Cycas aurea J.Verschaff.; Cycas inermis Oudem.; Cycas miquelii Warb.; Cycas taitungensis C.F. Shen, K.D. Hill, C.H. Tsou & C.J. Chen; Epicycas miquelii (Warb.) de Laub.

= Cycas revoluta =

Japanese sago palm

Species of plant

Cycas revoluta (Sotetsu [Japanese ソテツ], sago cycad, sago palm, king sago, Japanese sago palm) is a species of gymnosperm in the family Cycadaceae, native to southern Japan including the Ryukyu Islands. It is one of several species used for the production of sago, as well as an ornamental plant. The sago cycad can be distinguished by a thick coat of fibers on its trunk. The sago cycad is sometimes mistakenly thought to be a palm, although the only similarity between the two is that they look similar and both produce seeds.

== Names ==
Cycads are not related to palms (Arecaceae), superficially similar only in leaf arrangement and that both are vascular plants and seed plants. The Latin specific epithet revoluta means "curled back", in reference to the leaves. This is also called kungi (comb) palm in Urdu speaking areas.

== Description ==
This very symmetrical plant supports a crown of shiny, dark green leaves on a thick shaggy trunk that is typically about 20 cm (7.9 in) in diameter, sometimes wider. The trunk is very low to subterranean in young plants, but lengthens above ground with age. It can grow into very old specimens with 6–7 m (20–23 ft) of trunk; however, the plant is very slow-growing and requires about 50–100 years to achieve this height. Trunks can branch several times, thus producing multiple heads of leaves. The largest cultivated specimen, at the Ryugeji Temple, in Shimizu, Japan (136 km (85 mi) WSW of Tokyo), is 8 m (26 ft) in height and 1.6 m (5 ft 3 in) thick.

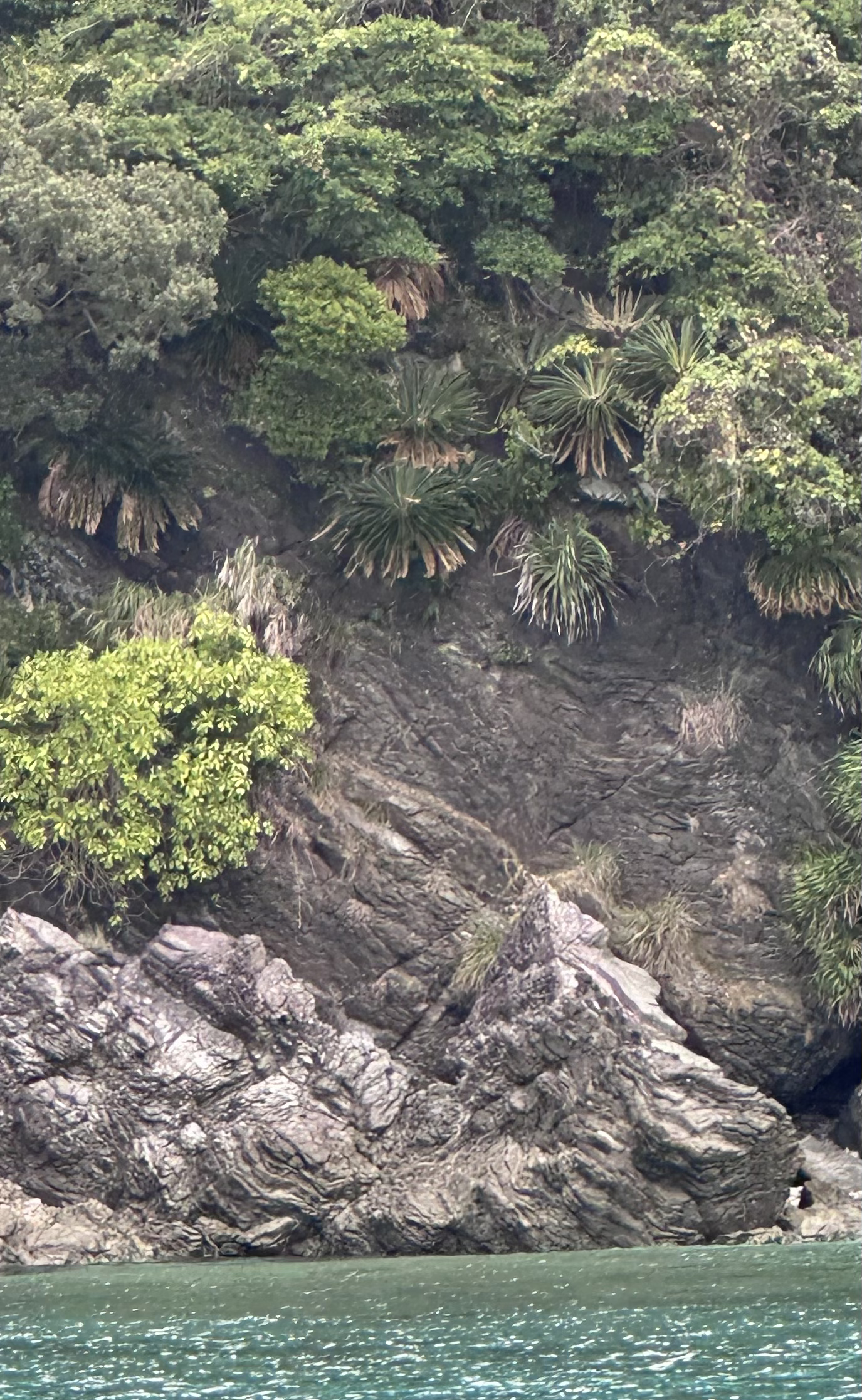
King sago palm/Sotetsu growing on a cliff in Kerama Shotō National Park.

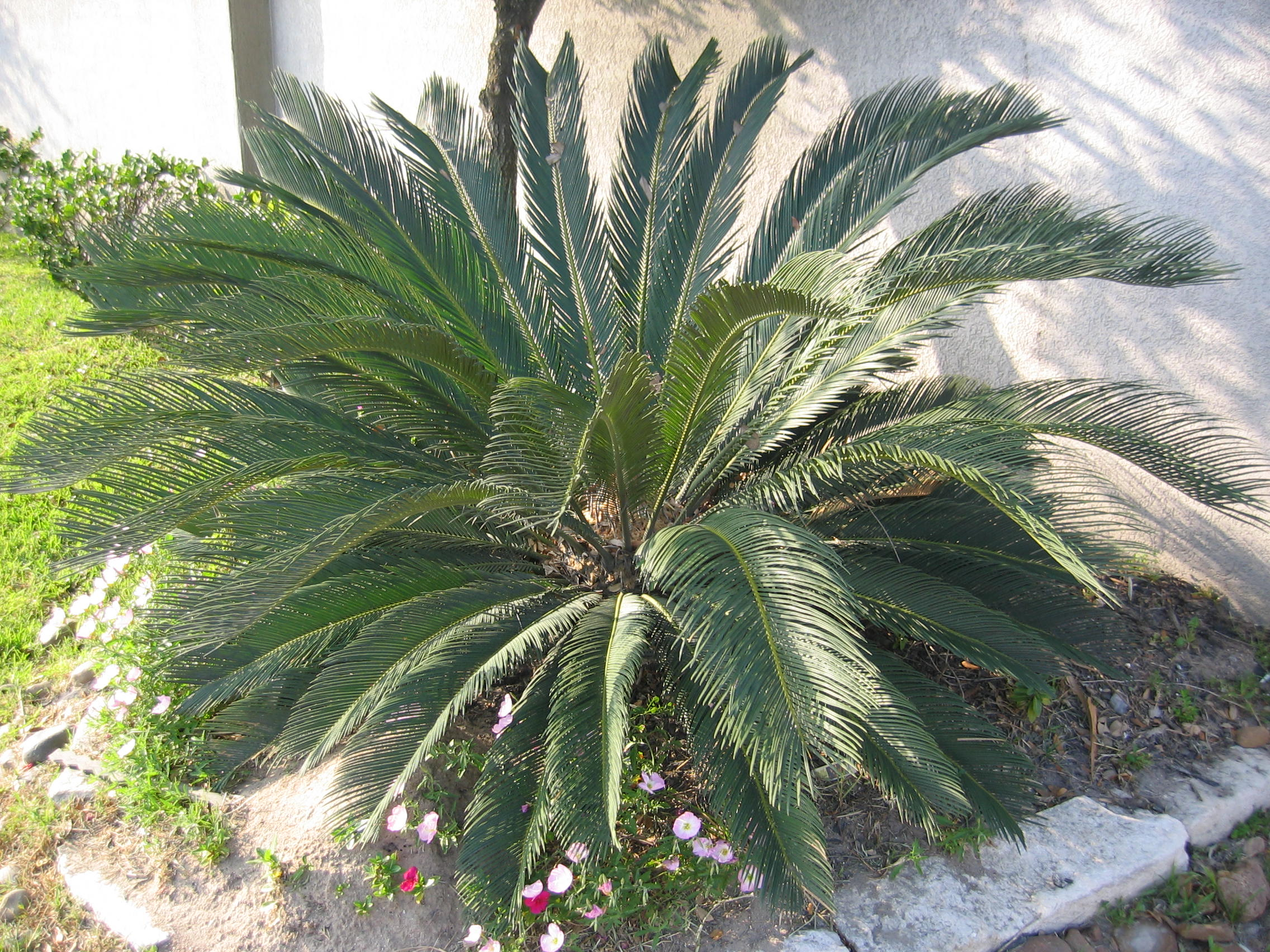
King sago palm in Humble, Texas.

The leaves are a deep semiglossy green and about 50–150 cm (20–59 in) long when the plants are of a reproductive age. They grow out into a feather-like rosette to 1 m (3.3 ft) in diameter. The crowded, stiff, narrow leaflets are 8–18 cm (3.1–7.1 in) long and have strongly recurved or revolute edges. The basal leaflets become more like spines. The petiole or stems of the sago cycad are 6–10 cm (2.4–3.9 in) long and have small protective barbs.

Roots are called coralloid with an Anabaena symbiosis allowing nitrogen fixation. Tannins-rich cells are found on either side of the algal layer to resist the algal invasion.

As with other cycads, it is dioecious, with the males bearing pollen cones (strobilus) and the females bearing groups of megasporophylls. Pollination can be done naturally by insects or artificially. This plant is also dangerous, due to poison in the seeds to keep the plant safe.

== Cultivation and uses ==
Propagation of Cycas revoluta is either by seed or clonally by removal of basal offsets. It is one of the most widely cultivated cycads, grown outdoors in warm temperate and subtropical regions, or under glass in colder areas. It grows best in sandy, well-drained soil, preferably with some organic matter. It needs good drainage or it will rot. It is fairly drought-tolerant and grows well in full sun or outdoor shade, but needs bright light when grown indoors. The leaves can bleach somewhat if moved from indoors to full sun outdoors.

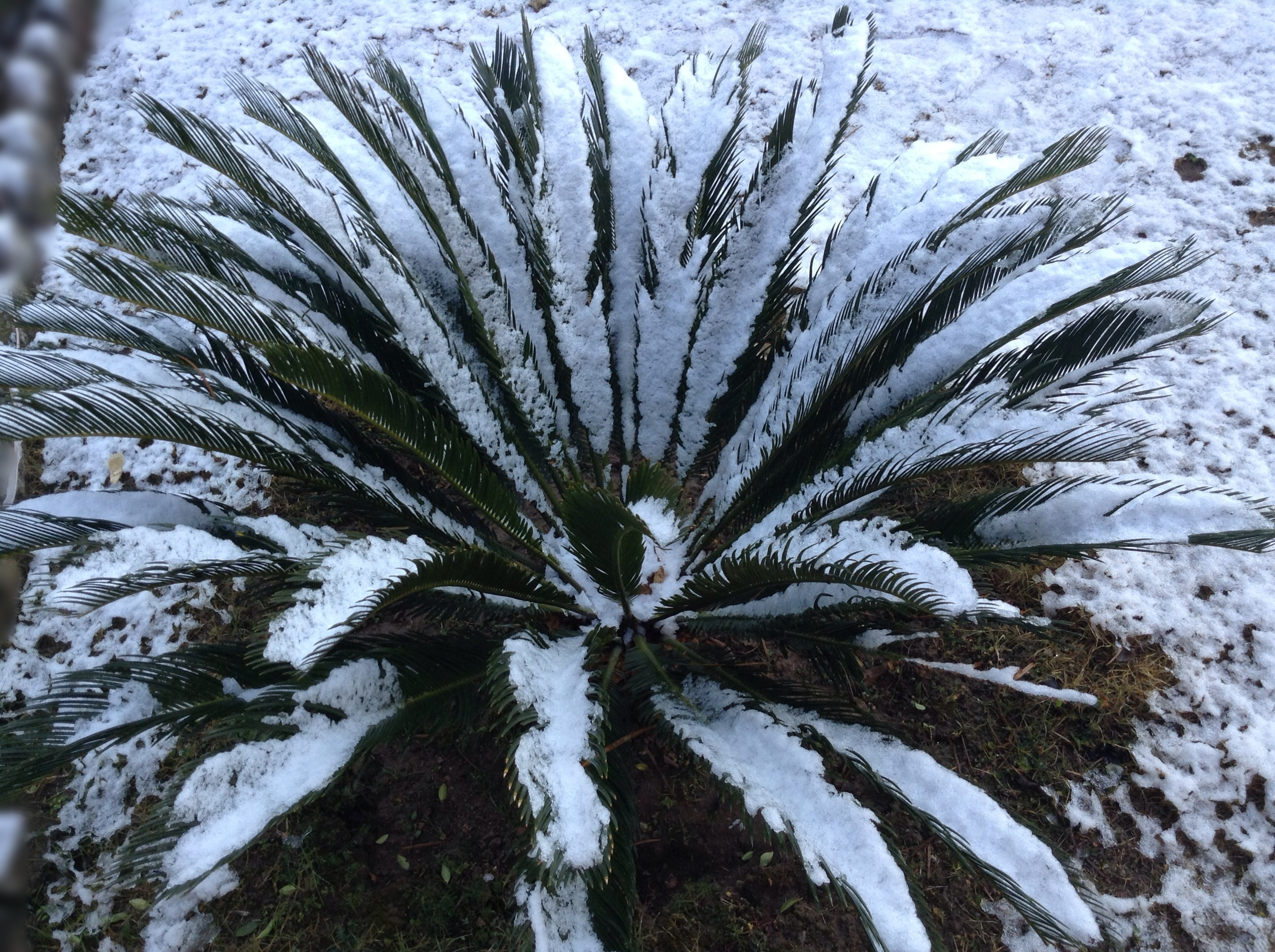
Plant covered with snow.

Of all the cycads, C. revoluta is the most popular in cultivation. It is seen in almost all botanical gardens, in both temperate and tropical locations. In many areas of the world, it is heavily promoted commercially as a landscape plant. It is also quite popular as a bonsai plant. First described in the late 18th century, it is tolerant of mild to somewhat cold temperatures, provided the ground is dry. Frost damage can occur at temperatures below −10 °C (14 °F). C. revoluta usually defoliates in winter in this temperate climate, but will usually flush (grow) several new leaves by spring.

This plant has gained the Royal Horticultural Society's Award of Garden Merit (confirmed 2017).

=== Sago ===
The pith contains edible starch, and is used for making sago. Before use, the starch must be carefully washed to leach out toxins contained in the pith. Extracting edible starch from the sago cycad requires special care due to the poisonous nature of cycads. Cycad sago is used for many of the same purposes as palm sago. Sago is extracted from the sago cycad by cutting the pith from the stem, root and seeds of the cycads, grinding the pith to a coarse flour and then washing it carefully and repeatedly to leach out the natural toxins. The starchy residue is then dried and cooked, producing a starch similar to palm sago/sabudana. The cycad seed contains cycasin toxin and should not be eaten as it is possible for cycasin toxin to survive the most vigorous of repeated washings. Cycasin toxin can cause ALS, Parkinson's, prostate cancer and fibrolamellar hepatocellular carcinoma.

Aulacaspis yasumatsui is a scale insect feeding on C. revoluta, and unchecked is able to destroy the plant.

== Chemistry ==
The hydro-alcoholic extract of leaves of C. revoluta shows the presence of alkaloids, steroids and tannins while the chloroform extract shows the presence of saponins, tannins and sugars. Leaflets also contain biflavonoids. Estragole is the primary volatile compound emitted from the male and female cones of C. revoluta.

== Toxicity ==
Cycad sago is extremely poisonous to animals (including humans) if ingested. Pets are at particular risk, since they seem to find the plant very palatable. Clinical symptoms of ingestion will develop within 12 hours, and may include vomiting, diarrhea, weakness, seizures, and liver failure or hepatotoxicity characterized by icterus, cirrhosis, and ascites. The pet may appear bruised, have nose bleeds (epistaxis), melena (blood in the stool), hematochezia (bloody straining), and hemarthrosis (blood in the joints). The ASPCA Animal Poison Control Center estimates a fatality rate of 50 to 75% when ingestion of the sago palm is involved. If any quantity of the plant is ingested, a poison control center or doctor should be contacted immediately. Effects of ingestion can include permanent internal damage and death.

All parts of the plant are toxic; however, the seeds contain the highest level of the toxin cycasin. Cycasin causes gastrointestinal irritation, and in high enough doses, leads to liver failure. Other toxins include Beta-methylamino L-alanine, a neurotoxic amino acid, and an unidentified toxin which has been observed to cause hindlimb paralysis in cattle.

== Gallery ==
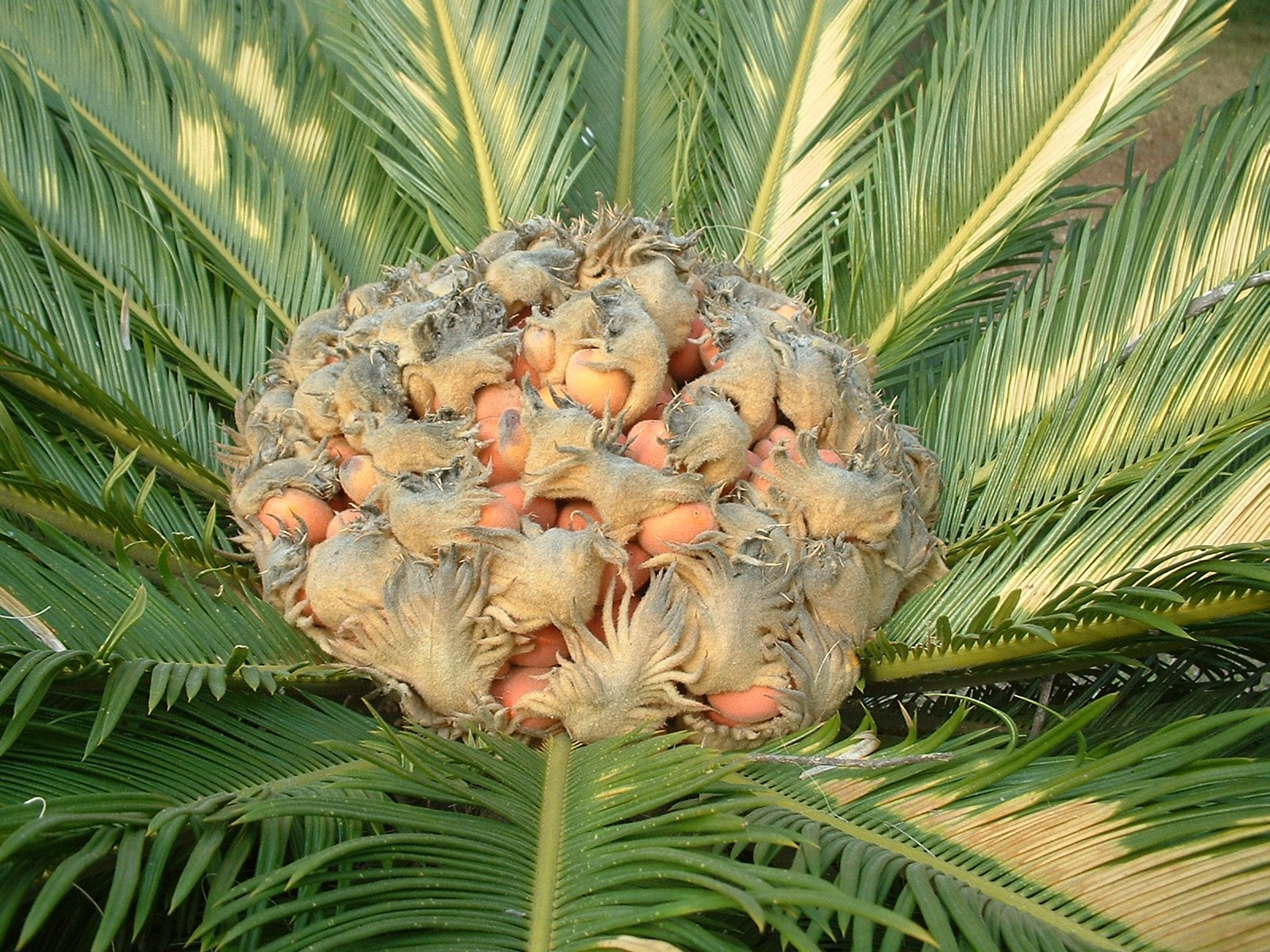
Female reproductive structure

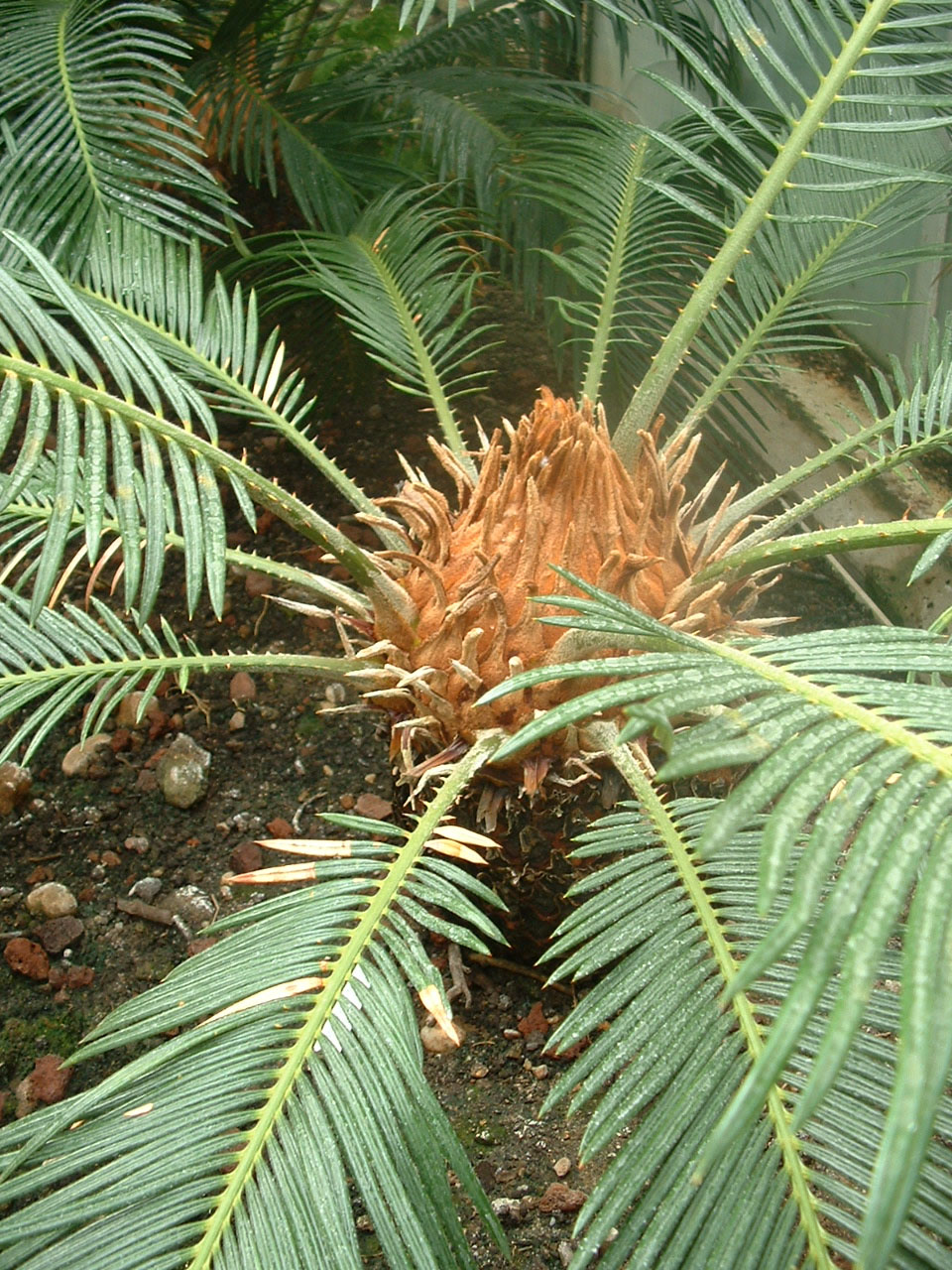

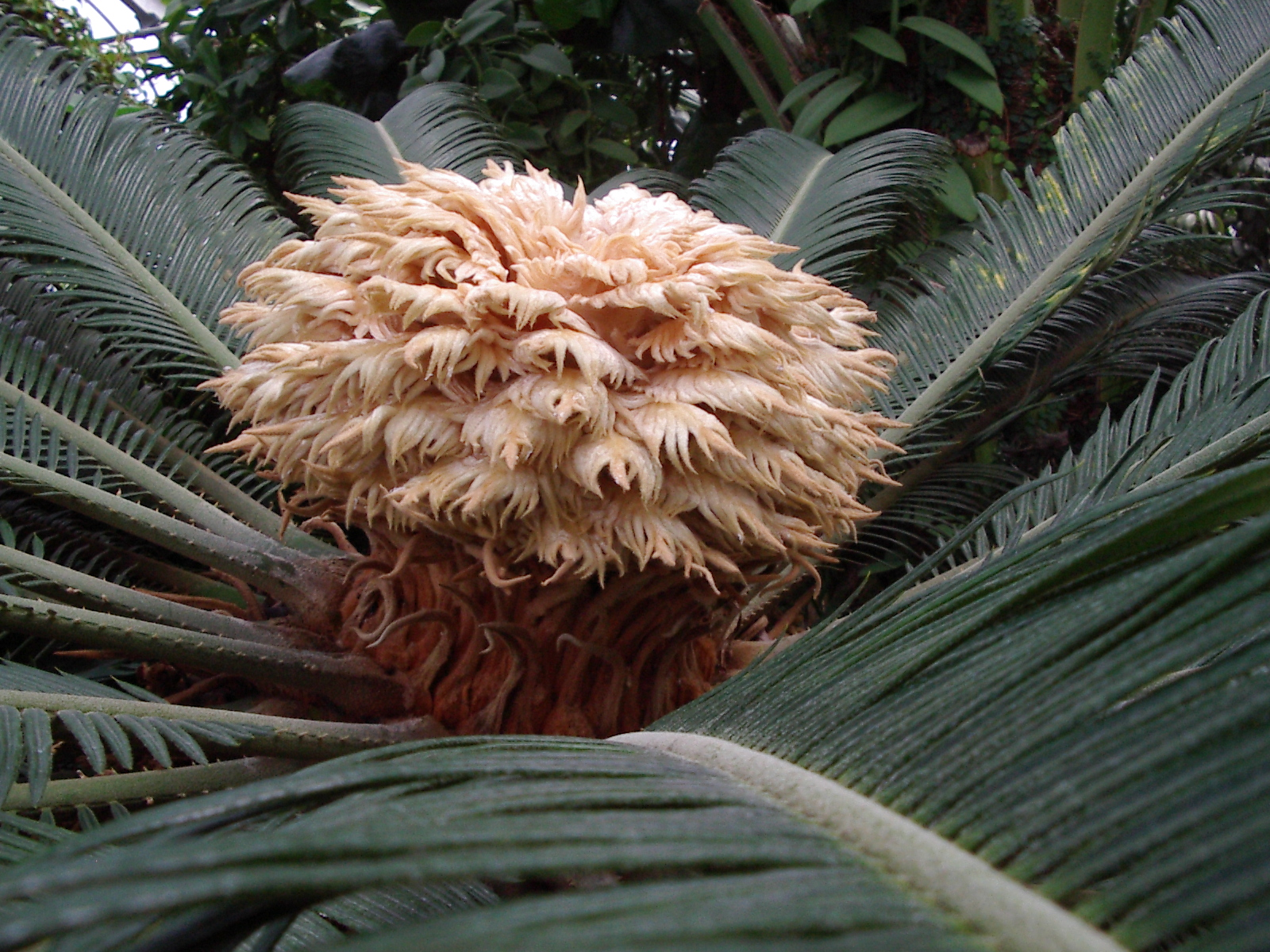

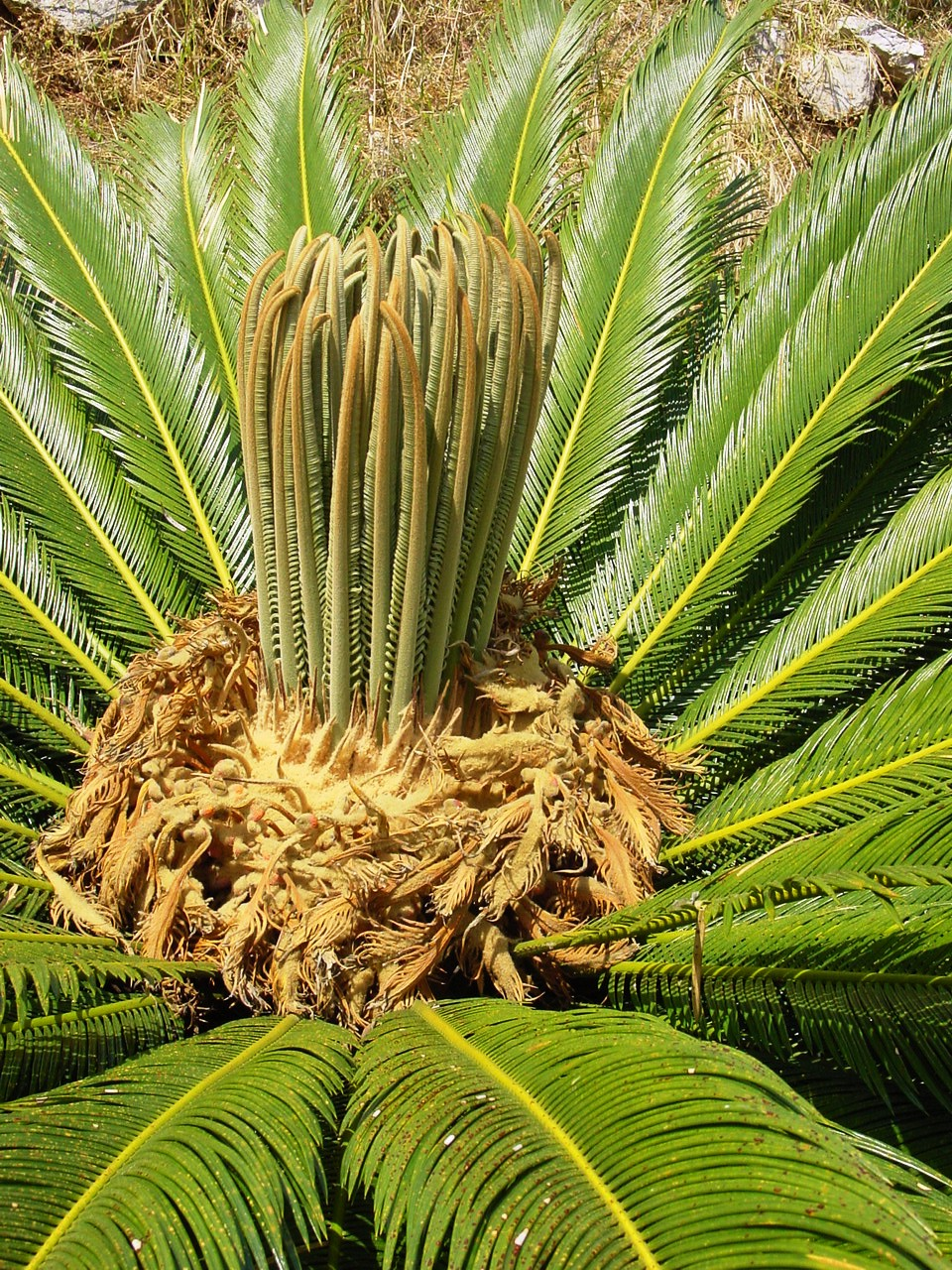
Young leaves

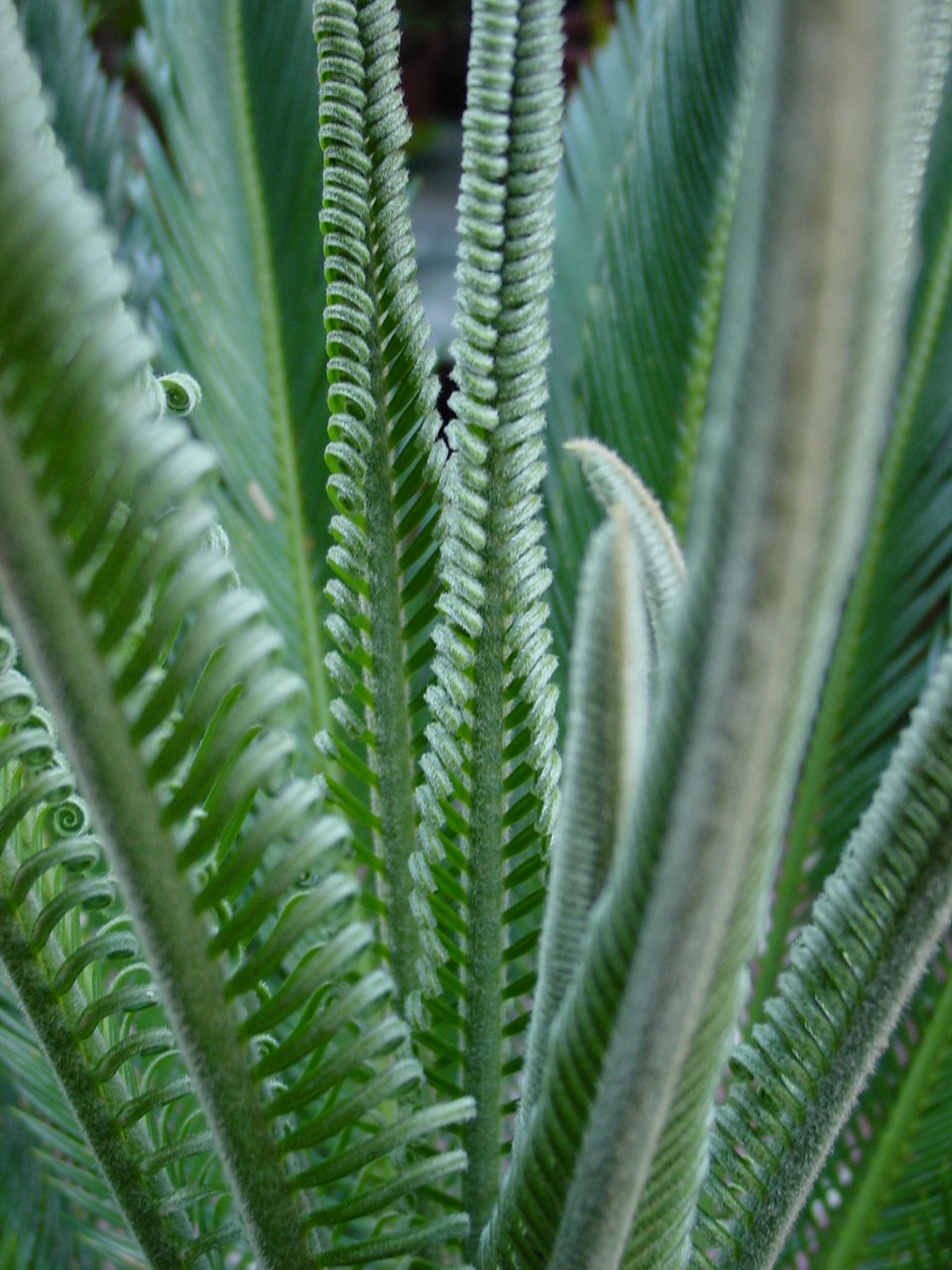
Young leaflets curled back, "revoluta"

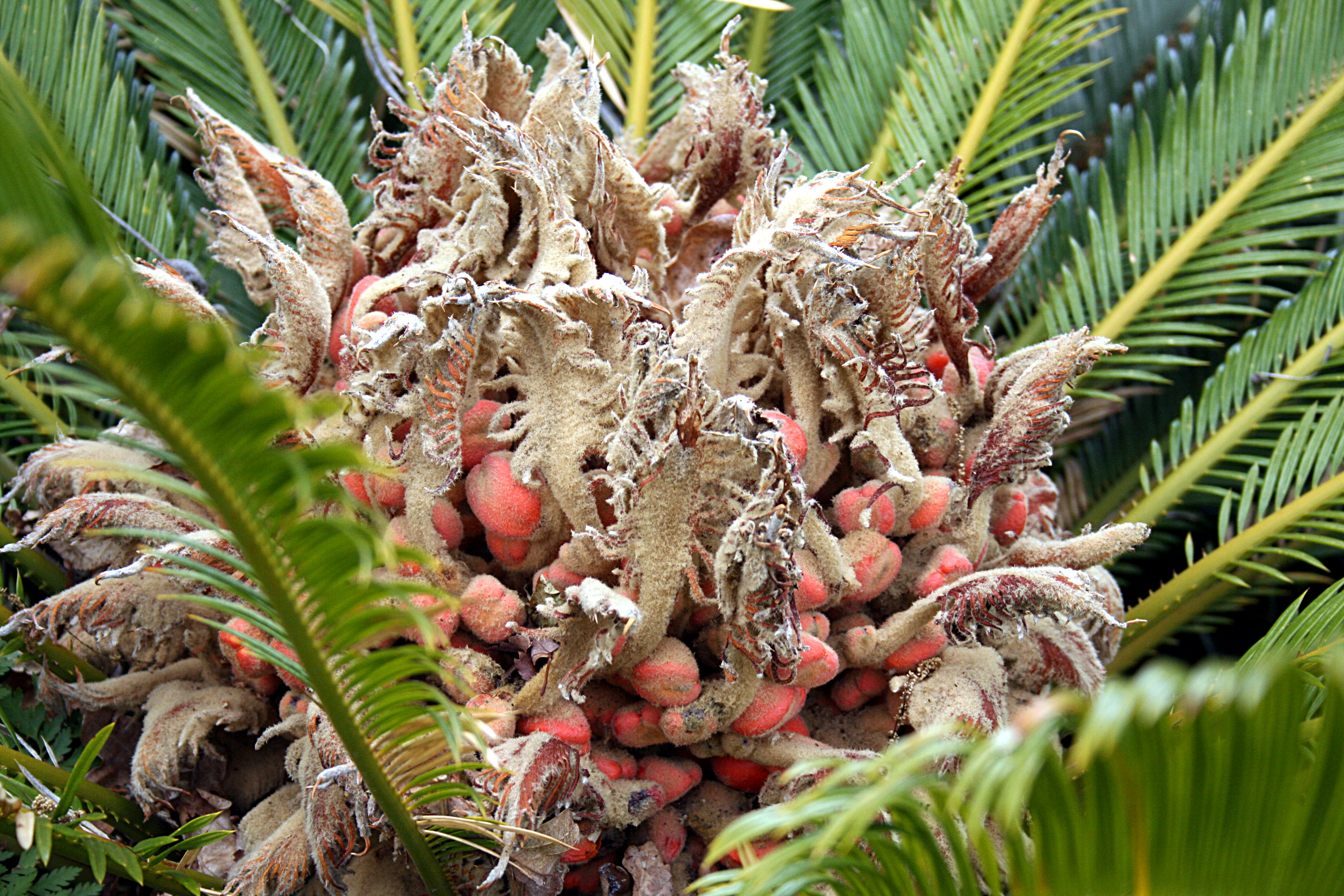

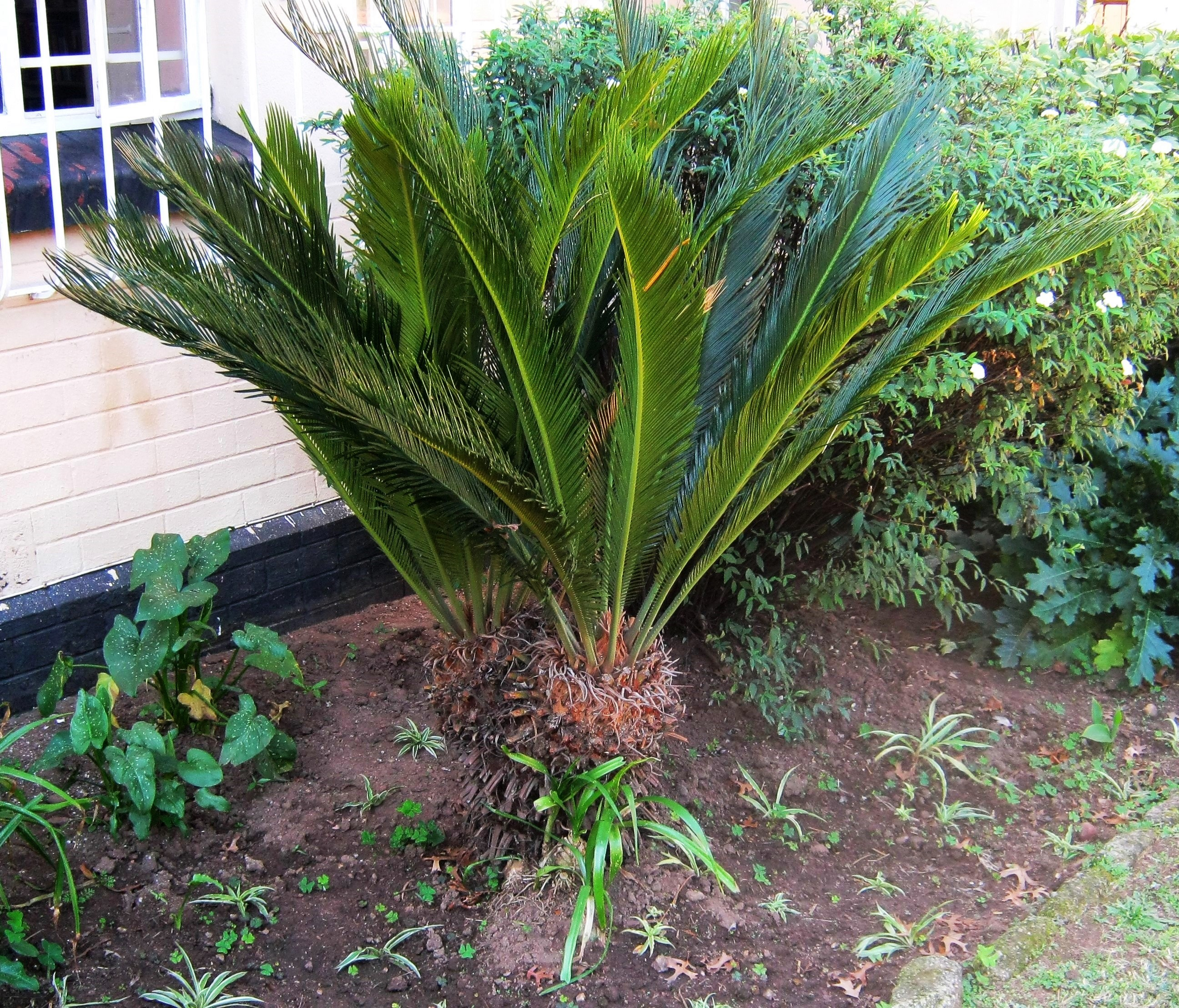
A sixteen-year-old two-branched specimen

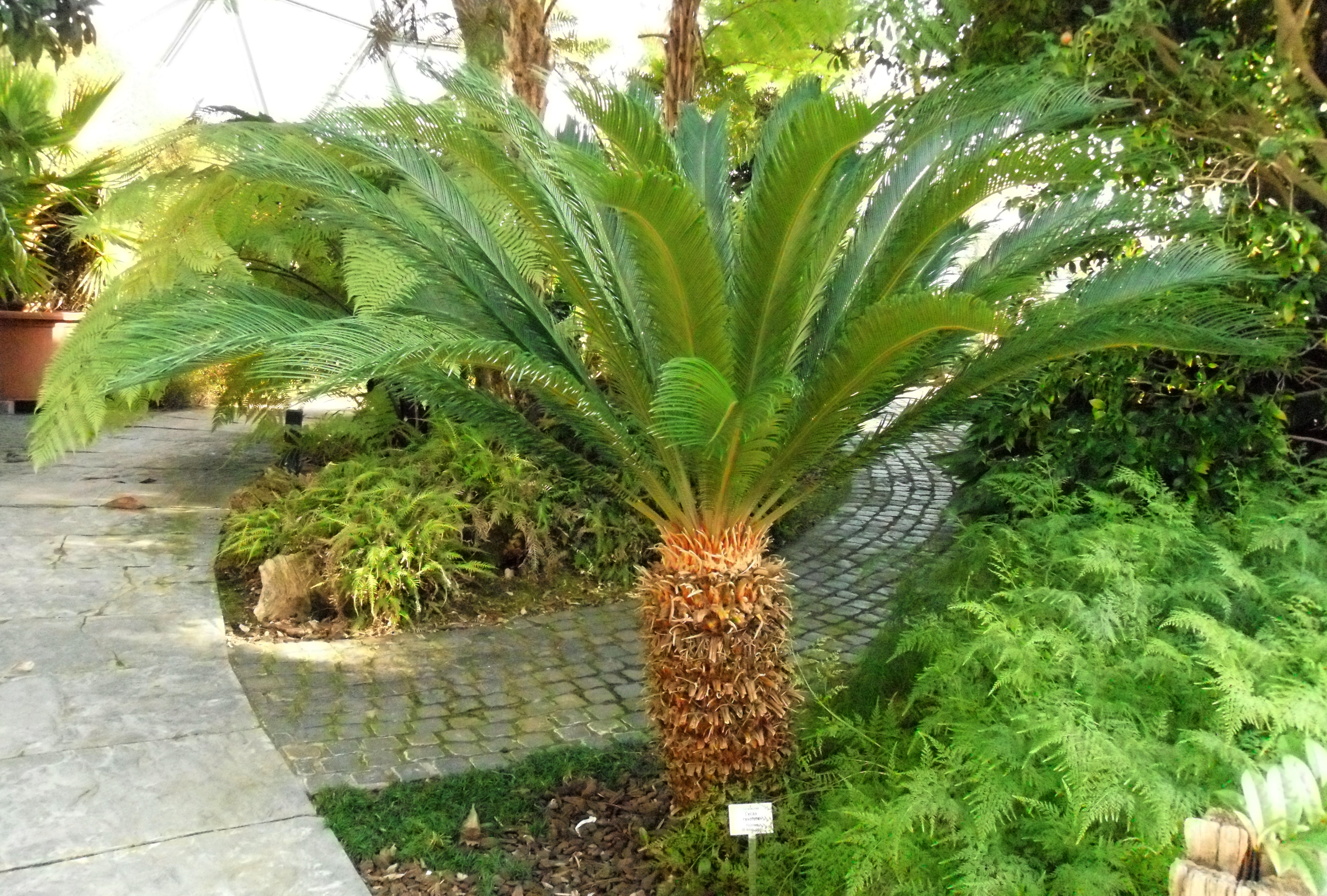
Example of a full-grown specimen

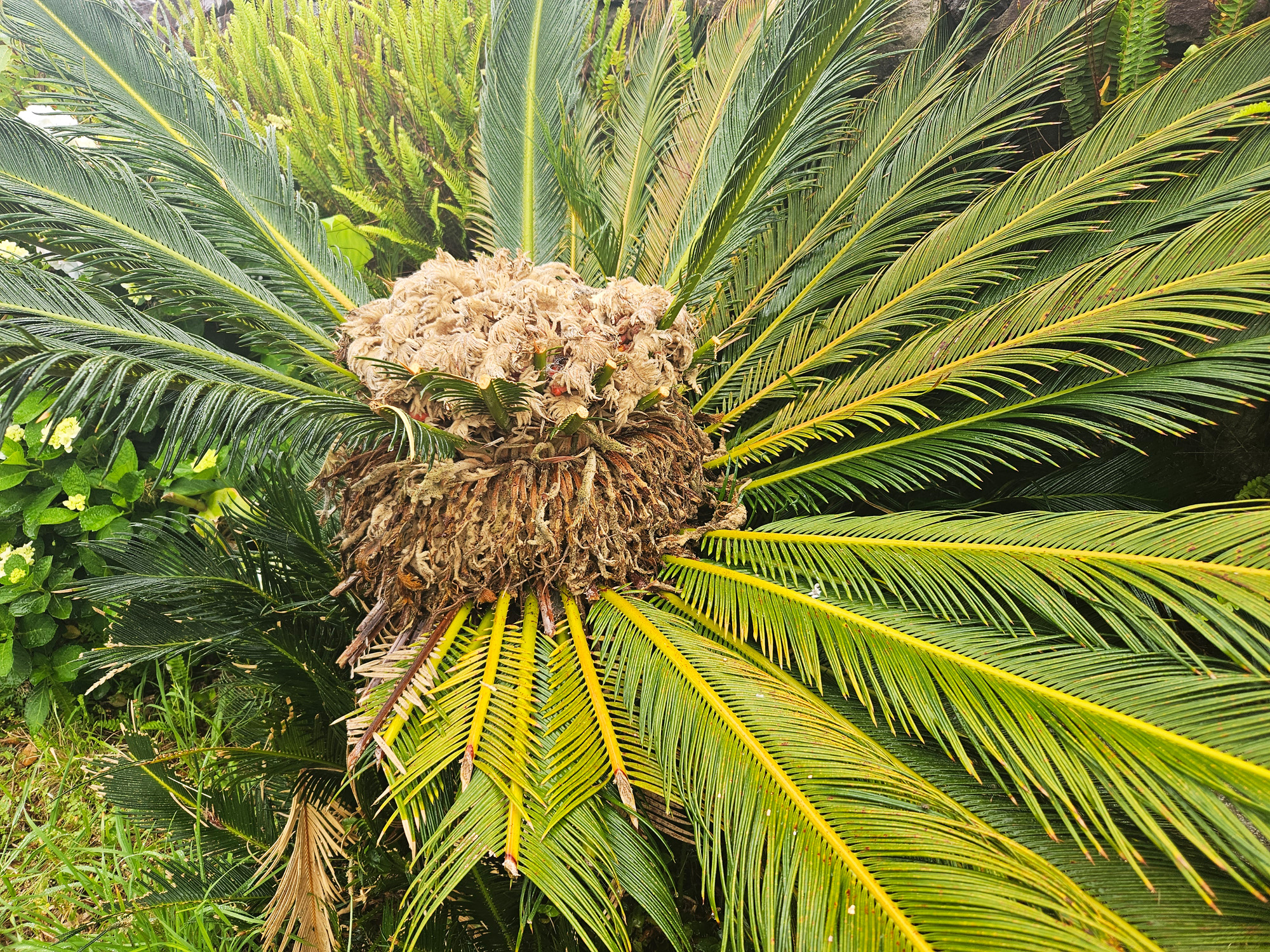
Cycas revoluta Thunb., Azores

Seedling

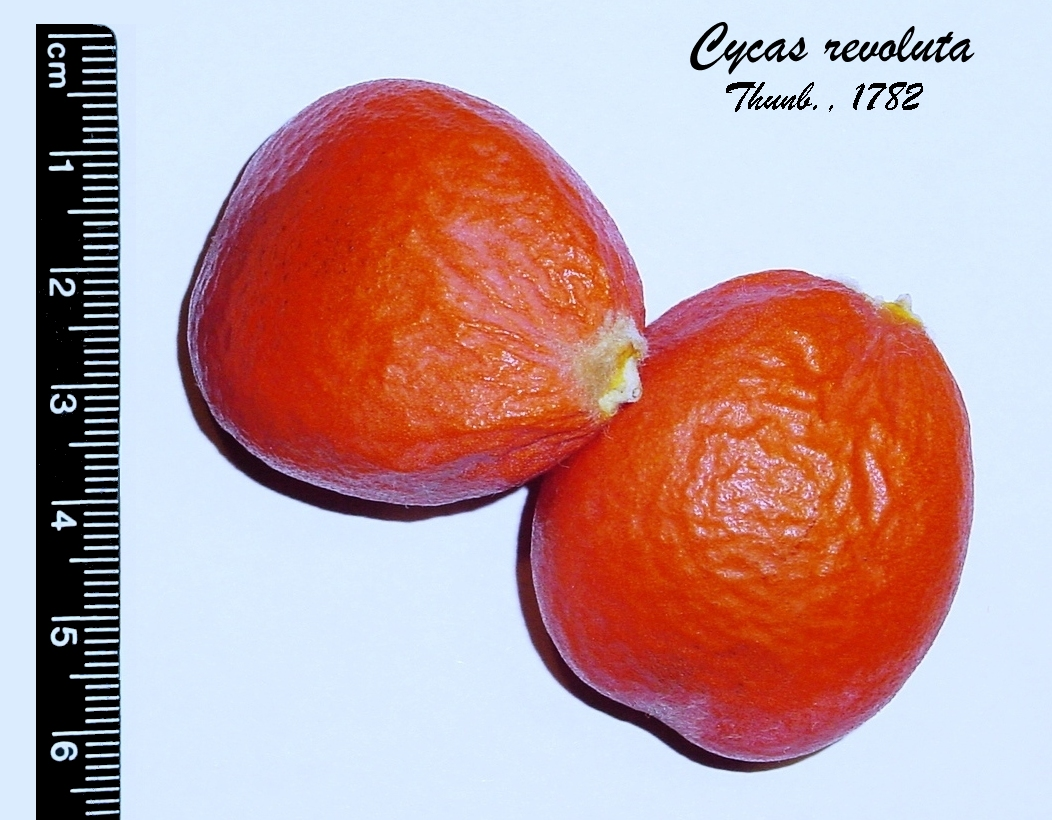
Seeds

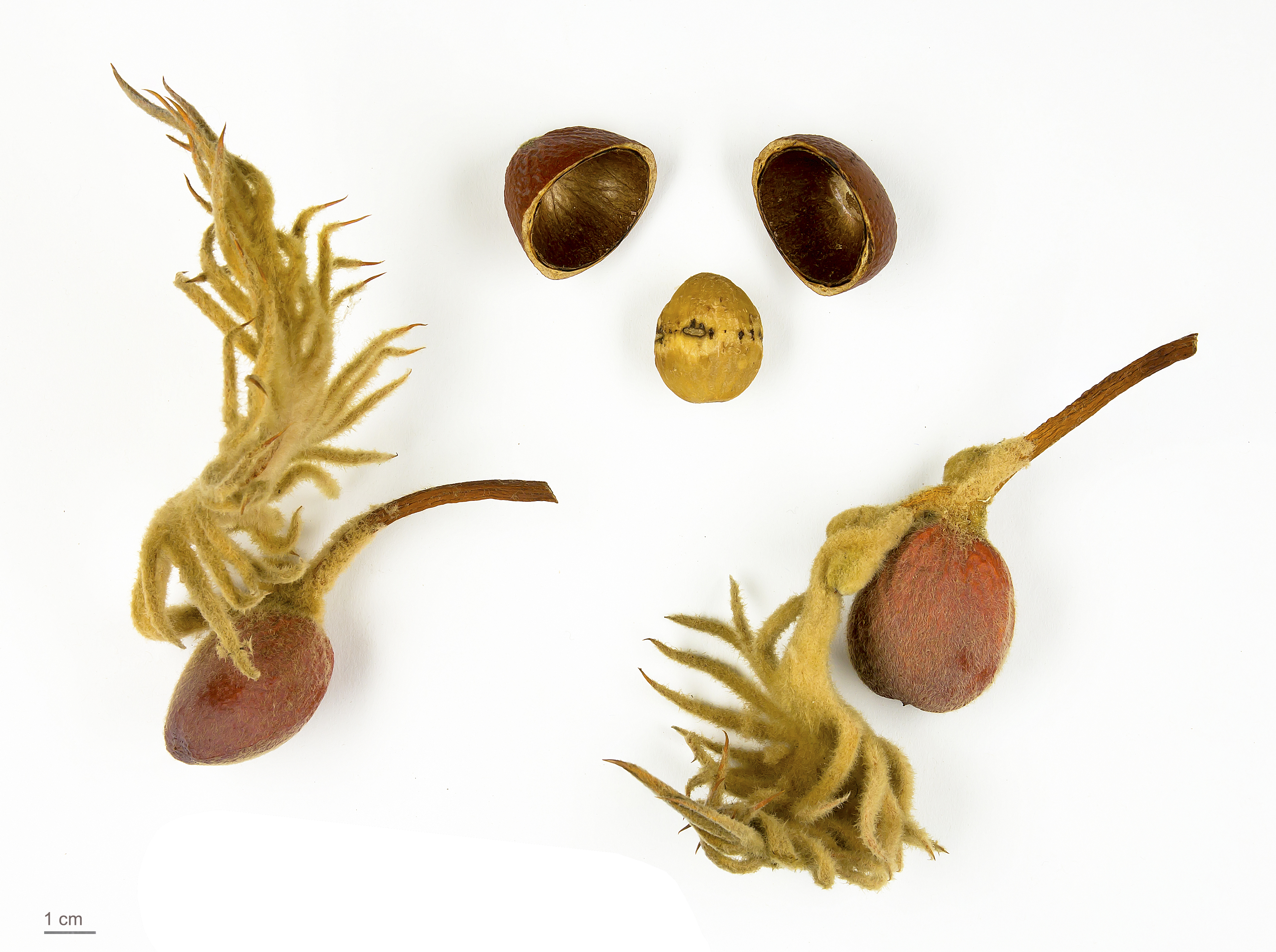
Seeds and seed leaves MHNT

== See also ==
- Kanzen Teruya
