= Biflavonoid =

Biflavonoids are a type of flavonoids with the general formula scheme (C6-C3-C6)_{2}.

== Examples ==
- Amentoflavone (bis-apigenin coupled at 8 and 3' positions)
- Lophirone L and lophirone M found in Lophira alata
- Sulcatone A, a naturally occurring biflavonoid isolated from Ouratea sulcata. Extracts of the leaves of this plant, used with and with other plant's extracts, are used in many African countries to treat some infections such as upper tract respiratory infections, dysenteria, diarrhoea and toothache. Positive antimicrobial activity has been shown in-vitro against Staphylococcus aureus and Bacillus subtilis. Escherichia coli showed to be resistant in the same study.
- Hinokiflavone, a cytotoxic biflavonoid from Toxicodendron succedaneum, Juniperus sp., or Chamaecyparis obtusa (hinoki).
- Leaflets of Cycas circinalis and C. revoluta contain biflavonoids such as (2S, 2′′S)-2,3,2′′,3′′-tetrahydro-4′,4′′′-di-O-methylamentoflavone (tetrahydroisoginkgetin).
- Agathisflavone
- Cupressuflavone
- Ginkgetin
- Kolaflavanone
- Morelloflavone
- Neorhusflavanone
- Ochnaflavone
- Podocarpusflavone A
- Rhusflavone
- Rhusflavanone
- Robustaflavone
- Sciadopitysin
- Spicataside
- Succedaneaflavanone
- Volkensiflavone
- Moghatin, extracted from Glossostemon bruguieri
