= Kanzen Teruya =

Japanese Okinawan physician

- Born: 1920; Shuri, Naha, Okinawa
- Died: 2004 (aged 83–84)
- Occupations: Physician, Professor of Public Health at the University of the Ryukyus(1978–1985)
- Known for: Contributions to the medical world in Okinawa after World War II and studies on Cycas poisoning on Miyako (1956)

Kanzen Teruya (1920–2004) was an Okinawan physician who contributed much to the Okinawan medical world in post-World War II days. He reported a mass Cycas revoluta (sago palm) poisoning in people living on Miyako-jima island in 1956. He later became a professor at the University of the Ryukyus (1978–1985).

== Life ==
Kanzen Teruya (照屋寛善) was born in January, 1920 in Shuri, Naha, Okinawa. He graduated from Kyushu Medical College, now the medical department of Kurume University in 1942. In the last days of World War II, he worked as an army physician stationed in Southeast Asia. After repatriation, he went to Kurume and then Okinawa. In 1956, he became the head of Okinawa Health Institute. In November, 1956, he studied a mass Cycas revoluta poisoning, the first in the world, which occurred because of starvation. In 1961, the vice-president of the Health Department, Ryukyu Government. In 1963, he became the principal of Okinawa Nursing School. In 1973, he became the president of Okinawa Public Health Institute. In 1976, he became professor at the Department of Health, University of the Ryukyus, and in 1981, professor at the Department of Medicine, University of the Ryukyuus. In 1985, he retired from the university. In 1990, he became the head of Olive En Institute for the aged. He died in 2004.

== Other activities ==
- Medical policy regarding and control of the habu or Trimeresurus flavoviridis snake.
- Control of tuberculosis in Okinawa; he himself was a patient.
- Control of Paragonimiasis lung fluke in Okinawa.
- Critic of literary articles and essays for patients with leprosy at Okinawa Airakuen Sanatorium.
- On 2 and 3 February 1960, Teruya explained actual Okinawan medical conditions to Taro Takemi, the then president of the Japanese Medical Association, and Takemi promised that Japan would help Okinawa in this regard.

== Honors ==
- Recipient of 39th Health Culture Award in 1987 by Dai-ichi Life.
- Recipient of Iha Fuyu Award (伊波普猷), in 1989 for Okinawan Classic studies.
