= List of Zamia species =

Species of a cycad genus (plant)

Zamia tree based on transcriptomes

- Zamia
  - - I
      - Caribbean islands 7 sp.
      - Florida Zamia integrifolia
    - II
      Fischeri clade 3 sp.
  - - III
      - III‑A
        Mega Mexico A 14 sp.
      - III‑B
        Mega Mexico B 7 sp.
    - - - IV
          Zamia soconuscensis
        - - V
            Isthmus 15 sp.
          - - VI
              West of the Andes 12 sp.
            - VII
              - Northern Colombia
                (Manicata clade) 4 sp.
              - East of the Andes 13 sp.

Zamia is a genus of cycads (non-flowering plants with seeds) found in the Neotropical Realm of the Americas. As of September 2026, there are about 90 species of Zamia recognized by major databases of plant species. A 2024 study analyzing transcriptomes from 77 species of Zamia found support for a phylogenetic tree of seven clades for the genus occupying different geographical ranges. Clade I includes species in the Caribbean islands and Florida. Clade II includes species in states along the Gulf Coast of central Mexico. Clade III, which is divided into the sub-clades III-A and III-B, includes species found in Mexico and northern Central America. Clade IV consists of a single species found in the Mexican state of Chiapas. Clade V includes species found in southern Central America. Clade VI includes species found in southernmost Panama and west of the Andes in South America. Clade VII consists of species found in northern Colombia and east of the Andes in South America.

== Accepted species ==
Almost all of the species in this table are accepted as valid in at least four of the following databases, including The World List of Cycads (WLC), the USDA-ARS Germplasm Resources Information Network (GRIN), the Kew Gardens Plants of the World Online (Kew), the World Flora Online (WFO). and Tropicos. A few species accepted in only three of the five databases are noted individually. The second column lists the clade in which the species was placed in the 2024 study based on transcriptomes. The third column lists the countries, or in the cases of Brazil, Mexico, and the United States, the states, in which the species are found. The fourth column includes the vulnerability assessment published by the International Union for Conservation of Nature (IUCN) for each species.

Species	Clade	Distribution	IUCN status
Zamia acuminata Oerst.ex Dyer	V (Isthmus)	Costa Rica, Nicaragua, Panama	Vulnerable
Zamia amazonum D.W.Stev.	VII (East of Andes)	Brazil, Colombia, Ecuador, Peru, Venezuela	Least concern
Zamia amplifolia Hort.Bull ex Mast.	VI (West of Andes)	Colombia	Endangered
Zamia angustifolia Jacq.	I (Caribbean)	Bahamas, Cuba	Vulnerable
Zamia boliviana (Brongn.) A.DC.	VII (East of Andes)	Bolivia, Brazil (Mato Grosso)	Least concern
Zamia brasiliensis Calonje & Segalla	(unknown)	Brazil (Mato Grosso, Rondônia)	Not evaluated
Zamia chigua Seem.	VI (West of Andes)	Colombia	Near threatened
Zamia cremnophila Vovides, Schutzman & Dehgan	III-A (Mega Mexico)	Mexico (Tabasco)	Endangered
Zamia cunaria Dressler & D.W.Stev.	VI (West of Andes)	Panama	Endangered
Zamia decumbens Calonje, Meerman, M.P. Griff. & Hoese	III-B (Mega Mexico)	Belize	Endangered
Zamia disodon D.W.Stev. & Sabato	VII (Manicata)	Colombia	Endangered
Zamia dressleri D.W.Stev.	V (Isthmus)	Panama	Endangered
Zamia elegantissima Schutzman, Vovides & R.S.Adams	V (Isthmus)	Panama	Endangered
Zamia encephalartoides D.W. Stev.	VII (East of Andes)	Colombia	Endangered
Zamia erosa O.F.Cook & G.N.Collins	I (Caribbean)	Cuba, Jamaica, Puerto Rico	Vulnerable
Zamia fairchildiana L.D.Gómez	V (Isthmus)	Panama, Costa Rica	Near threatened
Zamia fischeri Miq. ex Lem.	II (Fischeri)	Mexico (Hidalgo, San Luis Potosí, Querétaro, Tamaulipas, Veracruz)	Endangered
Zamia furfuracea L.f.	III-A (Mega Mexico)	Mexico (Veracruz)	Endangered
Zamia gentryi Dodson	VI (West of Andes)	Ecuador	Endangered
Zamia gomeziana R.H.Acuña	(unknown)	Costa Rica	Near threatened
Zamia grijalvensis Pérez-Farr., Vovides & Mart.-Camilo	III-A (Mega Mexico)	Mexico (Chiapas)	Critically endangered
Zamia hamannii A.S.Taylor, J.L.Haynes & Holzman	V (Isthmus)	Panama	Vulnerable
Zamia herrerae Calderón & Standl.	III-A (Mega Mexico)	Mexico (Chiapas), El Salvador, Guatemala, Honduras, Nicaragua	Vulnerable
Zamia huilensis Calonje, H.E.Esquivel & D.W.Stev.	VII (East of Andes)	Colombia	Endangered
Zamia hymenophyllidia D.W.Stev.	VII (East of Andes)	Colombia, Peru	Least concern
Zamia imbricata Calonje & J.Castro	VII (Manicata)	Colombia	Not evaluated
Zamia imperialis A.S.Taylor, J.L.Haynes & Holzman	V (Isthmus)	Panama	Endangered
Zamia incognita A.Lindstr. & Idárraga	VII (East of Andes)	Colombia	Endangered
Zamia inermis Vovides, J.D.Rees & Vázq.Torres	II (Fischeri)	Mexico (Veracruz)	Critically endangered
Zamia integrifolia L.f.	I (Caribbean)	Bahamas, Cayman Islands, Cuba, Puerto Rico, United States (Florida, Georgia [probably locally extinct])	Near threatened
Zamia ipetiensis D.W.Stev.	VI (West of Andes)	Panama	Endangered
Zamia katzeriana (Regel) E.Rettig	III-A (Mega Mexico)	Mexico	Critically endangered
Zamia lacandona Schutzman & Vovides	III-A (Mega Mexico)	Mexico (Chiapas)	Endangered
Zamia lawsoniana (Note: Z. lawsonia is accepted in WLC, WFO, and Tropicos.) Dye	(unknown)	Mexico (Chiapas, Oaxaca, Tabasco, Veracruz)	Not evaluated
Zamia lecointei Ducke	VII (East of Andes)	Brazil (Pará), Colombia, Peru, Venezuela	Least concern
Zamia lindenii Regel ex André	VI (West of Andes)	Ecuador, Peru	Endangered
Zamia lindleyi Warsz. ex A.Dietr.	V (Isthmus)	Panama	Endangered
Zamia lindosensis Stevenson, Cárdenas & Castaño	(unknown)	Colombia	Not evaluated
Zamia loddigesii Miq.	III-A (Mega Mexico)	Belize, El Salvador, Honduras, Mexico (Campeche, Chiapas, Veracruz, Puebla, Oaxaca, Hidalgo, Tabasco, Tamaulipas, Quintana Roo, Yucatán)	Near threatened
Zamia lucayana Britton	I (Caribbean)	Bahamas	Critically endangered
Zamia macrochiera D.W.Stev.	VII (East of Andes)	Peru	Endangered
Zamia magnifica Pérez-Farr., Gutt-Ortega & Calonje	(unknown)	Mexico (Oaxaca)	Not evaluated
Zamia manicata Linden ex Regel	VII (Manicata)	Colombia, Panama	Near threatened
Zamia meermanii Calonje	III-A (Mega Mexico)	Belize	Endangered
Zamia melanorrhachis D.W.Stev.	VII (Manicata)	Colombia	Endangered
Zamia montana A.Braun	VI (West of Andes)	Colombia	Critically endangered
Zamia monticola Chamb.	III-B (Mega Mexico)	Guatemala	Critically endangered
Zamia multidentata Calonje, Segalla & R.S.Pimenta	(unknown)	Brazil (Acre)	Not evaluated
Zamia muricata Willd.	VII (East of Andes)	Colombia, Venezuela	Least concern
Zamia nana (Note: Z. nana is accepted in WLC, Kew, and Tropicos.) A.Lindstr., Calonje, D.W.Stev. & A.S.Taylor	V (Isthmus)	Panama	Endangered
Zamia nesophila A.S.Taylor, J.L.Haynes & Holzman	V (Isthmus)	Panama	Critically endangered
Zamia neurophyllidia D.W.Stev.	V (Isthmus)	Costa Rica, Nicaragua, Panama	Least concern
Zamia obliqua A.Braun	V (Isthmus)	Colombia, Panama	Least concern
Zamia oligodonta E.Calderón & D.E.Stev.	VI (West of Andes)	Colombia	Critically endangered
Zamia onan-reyesii C.Nelson & Sandoval	III-B (Mega Mexico)	Honduras	Endangered
Zamia oreillyi C.Nelson	III-B (Mega Mexico)	Honduras	Critically endangered
Zamia orinoquiensis Calonje, Betancur & A.Linstr.	VII (East of Andes)	Colombia	Not evaluated
Zamia paucifoliolata Calonje	VI (West of Andes)	Colombia	Not evaluated
Zamia paucijuga Wieland	III-A (Mega Mexico)	Mexico (Guerrero, Jalisco, Colima, Michoacán, Nayarit, Oaxaca)	Near threatened
Zamia poeppigiana Mart. & Eichler	VII (East of Andes)	Bolivia, Brazil (Acre)	Least concern
Zamia portoricensis Urb.	I (Caribbean)	Puerto Rico	Endangered
Zamia prasina W.Bull	III-A (Mega Mexico)	Belize, Mexico (Tabasco, Yucatán)	Least concern
Zamia pseudomonticola L.D.Gómez	V (Isthmus)	Costa Rica, Panama	Least concern
Zamia pseudoparasitica Yates	V (Isthmus)	Panama	Near threatened
Zamia pumila L.	I (Caribbean)	Hispaniola (Dominican Republic), possibly Cuba; possibly locally extinct in Puerto Rico and Haiti	Vulnerable
Zamia purpurea Vovides, J.D.Rees & Vázq.Torres	III-A (Mega Mexico)	Mexico (Veracruz, Oaxaca)	Critically endangered
Zamia pygmaea Sims	I (Caribbean)	Cuba	Endangered
Zamia pyrophylla Calonje, D.W.Stev. & A.Lindstr.	VI (West of Andes)	Colombia	Critically endangered
Zamia restrepoi (D.W.Stev.) A.Lindstr.	VII (Manicata)	Colombia	Critically endangered
Zamia roezlii Regel ex Linden	VI (West of Andes)	Colombia, Ecuador	Least concern
Zamia sandovalii C.Nelson	III-B (Mega Mexico)	Honduras	Endangered
Zamia sinuensis Calonje & J.Castro	VII (Manicata)	Colombia	Not evaluated
Zamia skinneri Warsz. ex A.Dietr.	V (Isthmus)	Panama	Endangered
Zamia soconuscensis Schutzman, Vovides & Dehgan	IV	Mexico (Chiapas)	Endangered
Zamia spartea A.DC. in A.P.de Candolle	III-A (Mega Mexico)	Mexico (Oaxaca)	Critically endangered
Zamia splendens (Note: Z. splendens is accepted in WLC, WFO, and Tropicos.) Schutzman	III-A (Mega Mexico)	Mexico (Chiapas, Tabasco, Veracruz)	Endangered
Zamia standleyi Schutzman	III-B (Mega Mexico)	Guatemala, Honduras	Least concern
Zamia stenophyllidia Nicolalde-Morejón, Martínez-Domínguez & Stevenson	(unknown)	Mexico (Michoacán)	Not evaluated
Zamia stevensonii A.S.Taylor & Holzman	V (Isthmus)	Panama	Endangered
Zamia stricta Miq.	I (Caribbean)	Cuba	Vulnerable
Zamia tolimensis Calonje, H.E.Esquivel & D.W.Stev	VII (East of Andes)	Colombia	Endangered
Zamia tuerckheimii Donn.Sm.	III-B (Mega Mexico)	Guatemala	Near threatened
Zamia ulei Dammer	VII (East of Andes)	Brazil, Colombia, Ecuador, Peru, Venezuela	Least concern
Zamia urep B.Walln.	VII (East of Andes)	Peru	Endangered
Zamia variegata Warsz.	III-A (Mega Mexico)	Belize, Guatemala, Mexico (Chiapas)	Endangered
Zamia vazquezii D.W.Stev., Sabato & De Luca	II (Fischeri)	Mexico (Veracruz)	Critically endangered
Zamia verschaffeltii (Note: Z. verschaffeltii may be extinct.) Miq.	(unknown)	Mexico	Not evaluated
Zamia wallisii H.J.Veitch	VI (West of Andes)	Colombia	Critically endangered

== Partially accepted species ==
The following species described in February 2026 has been accepted by the World List of Cycads (WLC), but as of September 2026 has not been accepted by the Kew Gardens Plants of the World Online (Kew) or the World Flora Online (WFO) databases.

- Zamia urarinorum Calonje, R.Zárate & M.Asa Jones

== Invalid names ==
This list includes some 50 names of Zamia species that have been published, but have since been synoymized to other cycad species and are not currently accepted by the WLC, Kew, or WFO databases.

- Zamia afra Thunb., Syn. of Encephalartos afer
- Zamia allison-armorii Millsp., Syn. of Z. pumila
- Zamia amblyphyllidia, Syn. of Z. erosa
- Zamia angustissima Miq., Syn. of Z. angustifolia
- Zamia atropurpurea Parm. ex Miq., Syn. of Ceratozamia mexicana
- Zamia baraquiniana hort. ex Regel, Syn. of Z. poeppigiana
- Zamia bussellii Schutzman, R.S., R.S. Adams, J.L. Haynes & Whitelock, Syn. of Z. onan-reyesii
- Zamia calocoma Miq., Syn. of Microcycas calocoma
- Zamia caracasana Lodd. ex Miq., Syn. of Z. loddigesii
- Zamia chamberlainii J. Schuster., Syn. of Z. pygmaea
- Zamia cupatiensis Ducke, Syn. of Z. ulei
- Zamia cycadifolia Jacq., Syn. of Encephalartos cycadifolius or Macrozamia fraseri
- Zamia debilis L. f., Syn. of Z. pumila
- Zamia dentata Voigt, Syn. of Z. integrifolia
- Zamia floridana A. DC., Syn. of Z. integrifolia
- Zamia friderici-guilielmi hort. ex Miq., Syn. of Encephalartos friderici-guilielmi
- Zamia fusca Schaedtler, Syn. of Z. verschaffeltii
- Zamia galeottii de Vriese, Syn. of Z. loddigesii
- Zamia guggenheimiana Catabia, Syn. of Z. angustifolia
- Zamia gutierrezii Sauvalle, Syn. of Z. muricata
- Zamia horrida Jacq., Syn. of Encephalartos horridus
- Zamia jirijirimensis R.E. Schult., Syn. of Z. lecointei
- Zamia kickxii Miq., Syn. of Z. pyqmaea
- Zamia lanuginosa Jacq., Syn. of Z. wallisii
- Zamia latifolia LH.J.Veitchex A. DC., Syn. of Z. furfuracea or Z. muricata
- Zamia latifoliolata Prenleloup, L.A., Syn. of Z. pumila
- Zamia lindleyana Warsz. ex Schaedtler, Syn. of Z. chigua
- Zamia longifolia Jacq., Syn. of Encephalartos longifolius
- Zamia macrophylla Parm. ex Miq., Syn. of Ceratozamia mexicana
- Zamia madida R.E. Schult., Syn. of Z. manicata
- Zamia maelani Miq., Syn. of Dioon edule
- Zamia media Jacq., Syn. of Z. integrifolia
- Zamia mexicana (Brongn.) Linden, Syn. of Z. loddigesii or Ceratozamia mexicana
- Zamia multifoliodentata Calonje, R. Segalla & R.S. Pimenta
- Zamia multifoliolata A. DC., Syn. of Z. angustifolia
- Zamia noeffiana Linden x Wirrm., Nomen dubium
- Zamia obidensis Ducke, Syn. of Z. lecointei
- Zamia ottonis Miq., Syn. of Z. pygmaea
- Zamia picta (Miq.) Dyer, Syn. of Z. variegata
- Zamia polymorpha D.W. Stev.,A. Moretti & Vázq. Torres, Syn. of Z. prasina
- Zamia potemkinii hort. x Miq. Nomen dubium or Syn. of Z. verschaffeltii
- Zamia princeps W. Bull. ex Dyer, Syn. of Z. chigua
- Zamia pungens L.f. ex Salisb., Syn. of Phoenix dactylifera
- Zamia spiralis Salsb., Syn. of Macrozamia spiralis
- Zamia sylvatica Chamb., Syn. of Z. loddigesii
- Zamia tenuis Willd., Syn. of Z. integrifolia
- Zamia tonkinensis Linden & Rodigas, Syn. of Cycas tonkinensis
- Zamia tridentata Willd., Syn. of Macrozamia sp.
- Zamia umbrosa Small, Syn. of Z. integrifolia
- Zamia wielandii J. Schuster., Syn. of Z. poeppigiana
- Zamia yatesii Miq., Syn. of Z. angustifolia

== Sources ==
- Calonje, Michael; Castro Hernández, Jonatan; Coca, Luis Fernando; Jaramillo, Daniel; Aristizábal, Arturo (16 April 2021). "Two new species of Zamia (Zamiaceae, Cycadales) from the Magdalena-Urabá moist forests ecoregion of northern Colombia". Phytotaxa. 497 (1): 1–19. Bibcode:2021Phytx.497....1C. doi:10.11646/phytotaxa.497.1.1. ISSN 1179-3163.
- Lindstrom, Anders; Nabib, Sadaf; Dong, Shanshan; Dong, Yiqing; Liu, Jiang; Calonje, Michael; Stevenson, Dennis; Zhang, Shouzhou (2024). "Transcriptome sequencing data provide a solid base to understand phylogenetic relationships, biogeography and reticulated evolution of the genus Zamia L. (Cycadales, Zamiaceae)". Annals of Botany. XX (5): 747–768. doi:10.1093/aob/mcae065. PMC 11560380. PMID 38900840.
- Nicolalde-Morejón, Fernando; Vovides, Andrew P.; Stevenson, Dennis W.; Sosa, Victoria (March 2008). "The identity of Zamia katzeriana and Z. verschaffeltii (Zamiaceae)". Brittonia. 60 (1): 38–48. Bibcode:2008Britt..60...38N. doi:10.1007/s12228-008-9000-9. ISSN 1938-436X.
- Calonje, Michael; Stevenson, Dennis; Osborne, Roy (2026). "World List of Cycads — Accepted Taxonomy (Archival Snapshot)". Zenodo. doi:10.5281/zenodo.18940728. Archived from the original on 2026-06-07.
