= Zamia encephalartoides =

Conservation status
- Endangered (IUCN 3.1)

Scientific classification
- Kingdom: Plantae
- Clade: Embryophytes
- Clade: Tracheophytes
- Clade: Spermatophytes
- Clade: Gymnospermae
- Division: Cycadophyta
- Class: Cycadopsida
- Order: Cycadales
- Family: Zamiaceae
- Genus: Zamia
- Species: Z. encephalartoides

Binomial name
- Zamia encephalartoides D.W. Stev

Species of cycad

Zamia encephalartoides is a species of plant in the family Zamiaceae. Although it was collected and illustrated in the 18th century, it was not described as a species until 2001. It is the only Zamia to have seeds that are white when mature. It is threatened by habitat loss due to clearance of forests for farming. It is endemic to Colombia, found in only two locations in Santander Department, near the Chicamocha River and the Umpala River.

== Etymology ==
The species epithet encephalartoides refers to the resemblance of the species to the African genus Encephalartos.

== History and phylogeny ==
Zamia encephalartoides was first collected in 1783. While no collected specimen has survived from then, the plant was illustrated in color, and the distinctive female strobilus (cone) and white seeds are clearly shown on the color plates. The species was officially described by Stevenson in 2001.

Stevenson placed Zamia encephalartoides in a "Río Magdalena Valley element" together with Z. muricata, Z. lecointei, and Z. poeppigiana. A 2019 molecular phylogenetic study based on DNA placed Z. encephalartoides in a clade with Z. muricata and Z. lecointei, within the South America clade. A 2024 study based on transcriptomes found Z. encephalartoides to be sister to a clade that included Z. muricata, Z. lecointei, and four other species, in the "East of the Andes" clade.

== Description ==
The stem of Zamia encephalartoides is arborescent (tree-like), up to 2 metres (6 ft 7 in) tall and 25 centimetres (9.8 in) in diameter. Cataphylls are cuneate (wedge-shaped) at the base and pointed at the apex, up to 2 centimetres (0.79 in) wide and 5 centimetres (2.0 in) long. There are 10 to 15 compound-leaves on the apex of the stem that are 0.5 to 1 metre (1 ft 8 in to 3 ft 3 in) long. The petiole (leaf stalk) is 15 to 25 centimetres (5.9 to 9.8 in) long. Unlike most Zamia species, there are no prickles on the petiole or rachis (leaf mid-rib). There are 20 to 40 pairs of leaflets on a leaf. Leaflets are lanceolate, wedge-shaped at the base and pointed at the tip. The edges are smooth. Leaflets on the middle of the leaf are 20 to 30 centimetres (7.9 to 11.8 in) long and 1 to 3 centimetres (0.39 to 1.18 in) wide. The leaflets are leathery and pungent.

Like all cycads, Zamia encephalartoides is dioecious, with each plant being either male or female. The male strobili (cones) are cylindrical, 20 to 30 centimetres (7.9 to 11.8 in) long and 3 to 5 centimetres (1.2 to 2.0 in) in diameter, and cream to tan in color. They stand on 5 to 8 centimetres (2.0 to 3.1 in) long peduncles (stalks). Female strobili (cones) are cylindrical to ovoid-cylindrical, 25 to 40 centimetres (9.8 to 15.7 in) long and 10 to 15 centimetres (3.9 to 5.9 in) in diameter, and dark green in color. Seeds are 3 to 4 centimetres (1.2 to 1.6 in) long and 1.5 to 2 centimetres (0.59 to 0.79 in) in diameter, and, unique in Zamia, are white to cream in color.

== Distribution and habitat ==
Zamia encephalartoides is endemic to Colombia. It is known from two populations in Santander Province, Colombia. The species holotype was collected near the Río Chicamocha in that province. The primary threat to the species is the clearing of land for farming. Z. encephalartoides grows in very dry habitats. The Río Chicamocha population is located in the understory of a mesic forest with a sparse canopy that receives about 1,000 millimetres (39 in) of precipitation a year. The other population is near the Río Umpala in a xeric scrub with no tree canopy.

An unidentified species of the weevil genus Rhopalotria is associated with Zamia encephalartoides as pollinators.

== Sources ==
- Calonje, Michael; Meerow, Alan W.; Griffith, M. Patrick; Salas-Leiva, Dayana; Vovides, Andrew P.; Coiro, Mario; Francisco-Ortega, Javier (May 2019). "A Time-Calibrated Species Tree Phylogeny of the New World Cycad Genus Zamia L. (Zamiaceae, Cycadales)". International Journal of Plant Sciences. 180 (4): 286–314. Bibcode:2019IJPlS.180..286C. doi:10.1086/702642. ISSN 1058-5893.
- Lindstrom, Anders; Habib, Sadaf; Dong, Shanshan; Gong, Yiqing; Liu, Jian; Calonje, Michael; Stevenson, Dennis; Zhang, Shouzhou (November 2024). "Transcriptome sequencing data provide a solid base to understand the phylogenetic relationships, biogeography and reticulated evolution of the genus Zamia L. (Cycadales: Zamiaceae)". Annals of Botany. 134 (5): 747–768. doi:10.1093/aob/mcae065. ISSN 0305-7364. PMC 11560380. PMID 38900840.
- Lopez-Gallego, Cristina (2019). "Understanding Life History of Zamia Species Using Data from Field Studies and Botanical Collections". In Li, Nan; Stevenson, Dennis Wm.; Griffith, M. Patrick (eds.). Cycad Biology and Conservation. New York: New York Botanical Garden Press. doi:10.21135/893275389.013. ISBN 978-0-89327-538-9 – via ResearchGate.
- Stevenson, Dennis Wm. (2004). "Cycads of Colombia". Botanical Review. 70 (2): 194–234. doi:10.1663/0006-8101(2004)070[0194:COC]2.0.CO;2. ISSN 0006-8101. JSTOR 4354474.
