= Chigua =

Chigua may refer to:

- Several plants in Colombia commonly called "chigua", including:
  - Chigua (plant), a formerly accepted genus of cycads, now merged into the genus Zamia
  - Zamia chigua
  - Zamia obliqua
  - Zamia restrepoi, formerly classified as the genus Chigua
  - Zamia roezlii
  - Zamia wallisii
- Henry Reyes Chigua, Guatemalan military officer

== See also ==
- Chiguanco thrush (Turdus chiguanco)
- Johnson South Reef, Chinese: 赤瓜礁; pinyin: Chìguā Jiāo
