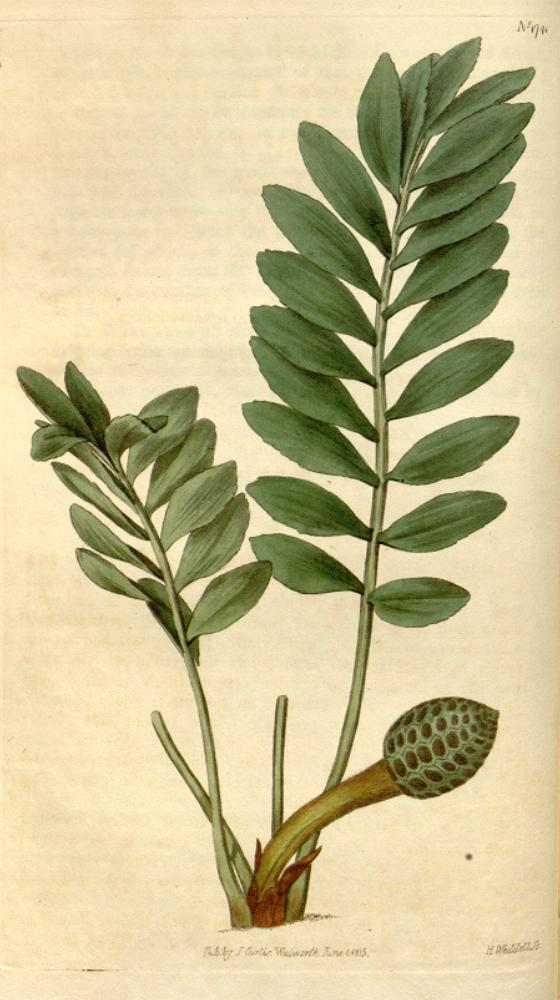
- Zamia pygmaea, Illustration.

Conservation status
- Critically Endangered (IUCN 3.1)

Scientific classification
- Kingdom: Plantae
- Clade: Embryophytes
- Clade: Tracheophytes
- Clade: Gymnosperms
- Division: Cycadophyta
- Class: Cycadopsida
- Order: Cycadales
- Family: Zamiaceae
- Genus: Zamia
- Species: Z. pygmaea

Binomial name
- Zamia pygmaea Sims

Synonyms
- Zamia pygmia: Zamia chamberlainii J.Schust.; Zamia kickxii Miq.; Zamia ottonis Miq.; Zamia silicea Britton

= Zamia pygmaea =

Species of plant

Zamia pygmaea is a species of plant in the family Zamiaceae found only in Cuba. It is the smallest living cycad. It is listed as critically endangered on the IUCN Red List based on its limited distribution, severely fragmented habitat, and population of less than 250 mature individuals.

Z. pygmaea is part of the Zamia pumila species complex.

== Common names ==
The vernacular names guáyiga, guayra, guayará or guayaro, which are generic names for Zamia cycad in general in Caribbean Spanish, are used for Zamia pygmaea and other closely related species in Cuba. The former name was first recorded by Bartolomé de Las Casas around 1550, who described it as the name used by the Indigenous people (Taíno) living in the mountains of Cuba, the other names are thought to be bastardisations of the first name when it was adopted into Spanish. The Taíno name for this plant is thought to be a possible origin for the Spanish verb guayar, 'to grate', due to the past use of Zamia species for making bread. Other names which are used for this species in Cuba are yuquilla de paredón and yuquilla de ratón, which refer to the poisonous nature of the plant.

The species has been given the name red dwarf cycad by one US website.

== Description ==
The smallest cycad plant, some individuals have been found which have only grown to a height of 25 cm (10 in). It forms a short underground trunk which holds a small crown of short, stiff, slightly arching leaves with rounded leaflets.

The plant has a small hypogeal stem, up to 2 cm (0.79 in) in diameter. The stem bears small sheathing cataphylls with a pair of inconspicuous stipules. In its harsh native habitat the compound leaves are one to four in number, but in cultivation plants may grow with up to twenty leaves —these have smooth petioles and rachis, and bear five to fifteen pairs of ovate leaflets, although in cultivation the plant grows more pairs of leaflets. They bear dark reddish brown, pedunculate pollen cones and dark reddish brown to gray seed cones. The seeds are ovoid and red to orange-red in colour.

Zamia pygmaea is one of the species of Zamia that can change drastically under cultivation. The plants become more vigorous and produce more and larger leaves and larger stems.

== Habitat and distribution ==
Zamia pygmaea is endemic to the tropical islands of Cuba. It is limited to western Cuba and Isla de la Juventud. It generally grows in open, dry habitats varying from serpentine to limestone outcrops to almost pure sand.

Along with Z. angustifolia, Z. pygmaea is one of the most xerophytic species in the genus. It occurs in dry brush covered hills, pine covered tropical grassland, tropical dry forest and tropical coastal areas of white sand. It is found from sea level up to 200 m (660 ft).

== Conservation ==
The primary threats to Z. pygmaea are from species mortality, brought on by direct harvest from the wild, farming and ranching as a result of agricultural expansion, and intensification and deforestation resulting in habitat loss or fragmentation. There are estimated to be fewer than 250 mature plants in western Cuba. It is protected in the San Ubaldo-Sabanalamar Ecological Reserve in the Pinar del Río province, and also in the Los Indios Ecological Reserve on the Isla de la Juventud island.

== See also ==
- Smallest organisms
