= Zamia lawsoniana =

Scientific classification
- Kingdom: Plantae
- Clade: Embryophytes
- Clade: Tracheophytes
- Clade: Gymnosperms
- Division: Cycadophyta
- Class: Cycadopsida
- Order: Cycadales
- Family: Zamiaceae
- Genus: Zamia
- Species: Z. lawsoniana

Binomial name
- Zamia lawsoniana Dyer

Species of cycad

Zamia lawsoniana, commonly known as pozol agrio, is a species of plant in the family Zamiaceae.

== Etymology ==
The epithet "lawsoniana" refers to the botanist John Lawson who collected specimens of the species.

== Classification history ==
Zamia lawsoniana was first described in 1884 by Dyer based on a specimen from Oaxaca, Mexico. It was later reclassified as a synonym of Z. loddigesii. It was removed from synonymy and restored as a valid species in 2024, and is recognized by the World Flora Online, the World List of Cycads, and Tropicos.

== Description ==
Zamia lawsoniana has an underground stem, branching in older plants, up to 60 centimetres (24 in) long and 18 centimetres (7.1 in) in diameter. There are two to five (rarely up to 14) compound leaves on a stem apex, standing upright. Leaves are 66 to 163 centimetres (26 to 64 in) long, emerging light-green, darkening to green when mature. The petiole (leaf stalk) is 18 to 52.3 centimetres (7.1 to 20.6 in) long, covered with thin prickles up to 3.4 millimetres (0.13 in) long. The rachis (leaf shaft), 32 to 66.5 centimetres (12.6 to 26.2 in) long, is also covered with prickles on the third of its length towards the base of the leaf. The petiole and rachis are straight in young specimens, developing a slight twist with age.

There are 16 to 32 pairs of leaflets, with medial leaflets 21.7 to 39 centimetres (8.5 to 15.4 in) long and 0.65 to 1.46 centimetres (0.26 to 0.57 in) wide. The leaflets are sessile (attached directly to the rachis with no stalk), coriaceus (leathery), linear, with a longitudinal groove, with a symmetrical acute apex. The outer one-third of the leaflet margins are toothed, with up to nine teeth on each side.

Like all cycads, Zamia lawsoniana is dioecious, with individual plants being either male or female. Male plants have one to three strobili (reproductive cones) on their apex. The male strobili are erect, 4.8 to 6 centimetres (1.9 to 2.4 in) long and 1.4 to 1.7 centimetres (0.55 to 0.67 in) wide, on a 19 to 32 centimetres (7.5 to 12.6 in) long Peduncle (stalk). Cone and stalk are light yellow in color and covered with hairs. Female plants have one (rarely, two) strobilus, 5 to 14 centimetres (2.0 to 5.5 in) long and 3.5 to 5.6 centimetres (1.4 to 2.2 in) wide, light-brown in color covered with hairs, standing erect on a 10.2 to 24.6 centimetres (4.0 to 9.7 in) long brown peduncle, also covered with hairs. The seeds are ovoid, up to 1.8 centimetres (0.71 in) long and 1 centimetre (0.39 in) wide. The sarcotesta (seed coat) is smooth, light pink when immature, and red when mature.

Zamia lawsoniana is distinguished from neighboring species such as Z. loddigesii, Z. spartea, and Z. stenophyllidia by details of leaf and strobili morphology.

== Distribution and habitat ==
Populations of Zamia lawsoniana are known from northern Chiapas, Tabasco, and southern Veracruz states in Mexico. Z. lawsoniana may also occur in southeastern Oaxaca, but extensive removal of forests to create pastures for cattle may have much reduced or eliminated it from the area. Z. lawsoniana is found from sea level to 840 metres (2,760 ft) above sea level in oak forests, evergreen tropical forests, and disturbed areas. The populations in Tabasco and Veracruz states are in heavily deforested areas. Only populations in Chiapas are in relatively undisturbed environments. Nicolalde-Morejón, et al., recommended that the species be classified as Endangered (EN), but as of 2025, the International Union for Conservation of Nature (IUCN) has not classified the species.

== Sources ==
- Nicolalde-Morejón, Fernando; Martínez-Domínguez, Lilí; González-Aguilar, Marlon Aramis; Stevenson, Dennis Wm. (2024). "Reestablishment of Zamia lawsoniana (Zamiaceae, Cycadales), an endemic species of Mexico, with first description of the ovulate strobilus". Acta Botánica Mexicana. 131 (e2262). doi:10.21829/abm131.2024.2262. ISSN 0187-7151.
