= Zamia lindosensis =

Scientific classification
- Kingdom: Plantae
- Clade: Tracheophytes
- Clade: Gymnospermae
- Division: Cycadophyta
- Class: Cycadopsida
- Order: Cycadales
- Family: Zamiaceae
- Genus: Zamia
- Species: Z. lindosensis

Binomial name
- Zamia lindosensis D.W.Stev., D.Cárdenas & N.Castaño

Species of cycad

Zamia lindosensis is a species of plant in the family Zamiaceae. It is endemic to Colombia. It is found in one location, the Serranía de la Lindosa, in the municipality of San José del Guaviare, Guaviare Department, Colombia.

== Etymology ==
The species epithet lindosensis refers to the type locality, Serranía de la Lindosa.

== Description ==
Zamia lindosensis has a subterranean stem, globular to cylindrical in shape, up to 10 centimetres (3.9 in) in diameter. There are one to four compound leaves on the apex of the stem. Cataphylls (modified leaves that protect the base of the true leaves) are papery, triangular to lanceolate, 5 centimetres (2.0 in) long, covered with brown hairs. The leaves are 1.1 to 3.4 metres (3 ft 7 in to 11 ft 2 in) long with a 0.75 to 2.4 metres (2 ft 6 in to 7 ft 10 in) long petiole (leaf stem) swollen up to 4 centimetres (1.6 in) wide at the base. The petiole is covered by spines up to 3 millimetres (0.12 in) long. The rachis leaf shaft is 0.3 to 1 metre (1 ft 0 in to 3 ft 3 in) long, with the lower third covered by spines. The stems and shafts are green and glabrous when they emerge. There are 20 to 50 pairs of leaflets on a leaf. The leaflets are up to 55 centimetres (22 in) long and 0.5 to 1.2 centimetres (0.20 to 0.47 in) wide, lanceolate with a sharp point. The leaflet edges are usually smooth, but occasionally are toothed. Leaflets emerge maroon, turning to orange or reddish, turning green at the apex and then gradually down the leaf to the base with maturity.

Like all cycads, Zamia lindosensis is dioecious, with individual plants being either male or female. There are one to five male strobili (cones) on a plant, on erect or slightly spreading peduncles (stalks). The cones are conical-cylindrical, 8 to 12.5 centimetres (3.1 to 4.9 in) long and 0.5 to 2 centimetres (0.20 to 0.79 in) in diameter, and covered with white and brown hairs. There is usually only one female strobilus on a plant, although there may be up to three. They are cylindrical, up to 30 centimetres (12 in) tall and 15 centimetres (5.9 in) in diameter, 8.5 to 19.5 centimetres (3.3 to 7.7 in) tall and 4 to 4.5 centimetres (1.6 to 1.8 in) in diameter. The strobilus is covered in rust-brown and white hairs. The strobili sit on peduncles that are 10 to 15 centimetres (3.9 to 5.9 in) long and 1.2 to 2.7 centimetres (0.47 to 1.06 in) in diameter. The peduncles emerge hairy and white, changing to maroon and then brown before losing the hairs and appearing green at maturity. The seeds are ovoid, 10 to 15.6 millimetres (0.39 to 0.61 in) long, and 9.5 to 13.2 millimetres (0.37 to 0.52 in) in diameter. The sarcotesta (seed covering) is red at maturity.

== Distribution and habitat ==
Zamia lindosensis has only been found in the Serranía de la Lindosa, which has an area of about 120 square kilometres (46 sq mi). It grows in tropical sandy soils in open areas among rock formations near tropical rainforest at 300 to 400 metres (980 to 1,310 ft) elevation. The subterranean stem can survive forest fires and forest clearance, and grows well in full sun. The species appears to be rare, and is threatened by agricultural expansion and other habitat modification. The Sinchi Amazonic Institute of Scientific Research has planted seeds and transplanted seedlings of Zamia lindosensis in suitable locations in the Serranía de la Lindosa in an attempt to establish additional populations.

== Acceptance ==
Zamia lindosensis has been accepted as a valid species by the World List of Cycads, Plants of the World Online, and World Flora Online.

== Sources ==
- Stevenson, Dennis Wm.; Cárdenas López, Dairon; Castaño Arboleda, Nicolás (2018). "A new Zamia (Zamiaceae) from Colombia". Brittonia. 70 (3): 364–368. doi:10.1007/s12228-018-9535-3. ISSN 0007-196X.
- Montero, Juan (2022). "Restauración ecológica en La Lindosa-Guaviare". Ierna (in Spanish).
