= Zamia × katzeriana =

Conservation status
- Critically Endangered (IUCN 3.1)

Scientific classification
- Kingdom: Plantae
- Clade: Tracheophytes
- Clade: Gymnosperms
- Division: Cycadophyta
- Class: Cycadopsida
- Order: Cycadales
- Family: Zamiaceae
- Genus: Zamia
- Species: Z. × katzeriana

Binomial name
- Zamia × katzeriana (Regel) E.Rettig

Species of cycad

Zamia × katzeriana is a species of cycad in the family Zamiaceae, endemic to Tabasco and Chiapas states, Mexico. It is a natural hybrid between Zamia loddigesii and Zamia verschaffeltii.

== Sources ==
- Nicolalde-Morejón, Fernando; Vovides, Andrew P.; Stevenson, Dennis W. (9 December 2009). "Taxonomic revision of Zamia in Mega-Mexico". Brittonia. 61 (4): 301–335. doi:10.1007/s12228-009-9077-9. ISSN 0007-196X.
