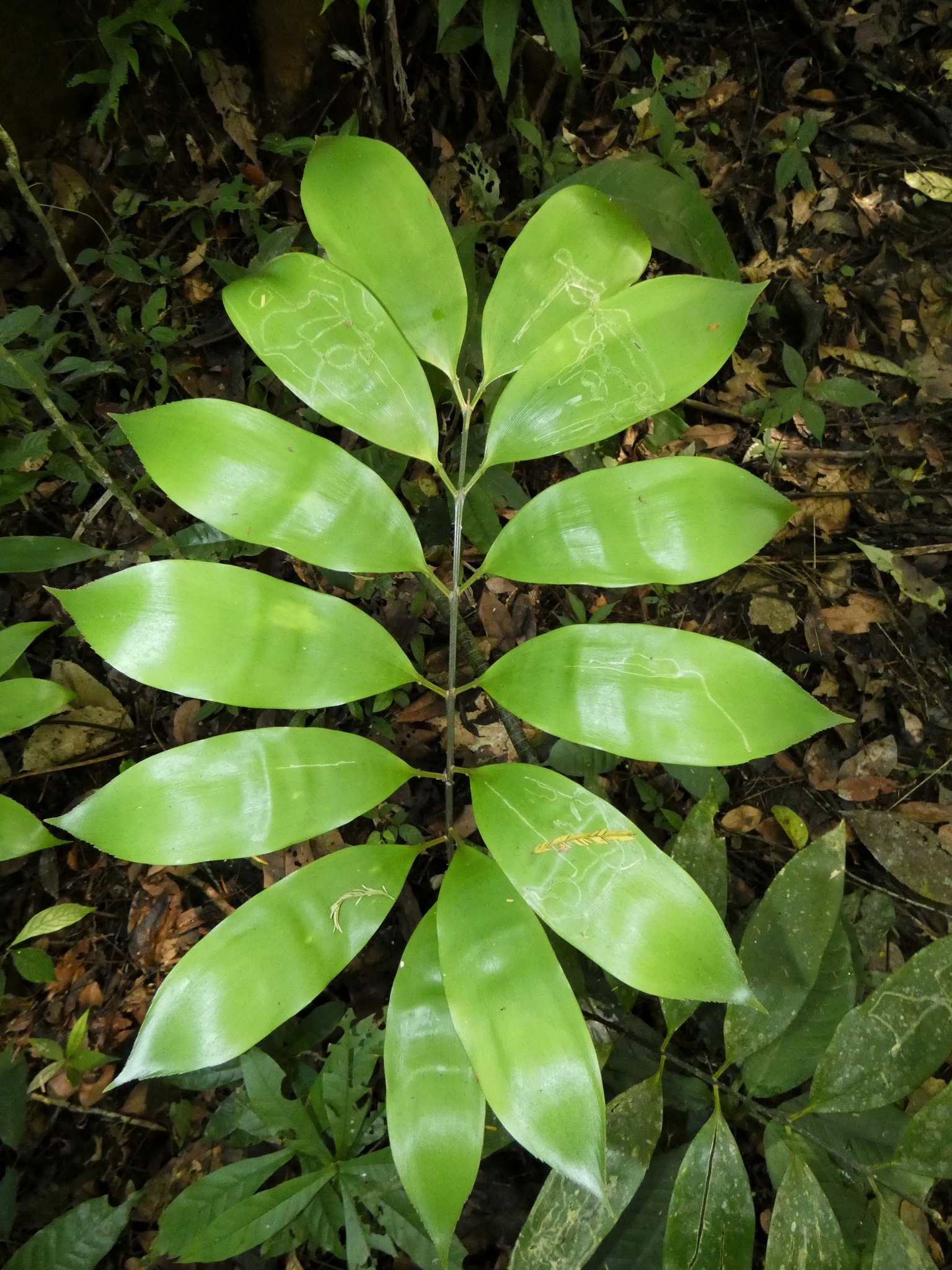

Conservation status
- Near Threatened (IUCN 3.1)

Scientific classification
- Kingdom: Plantae
- Clade: Embryophytes
- Clade: Tracheophytes
- Clade: Spermatophytes
- Clade: Gymnospermae
- Division: Cycadophyta
- Class: Cycadopsida
- Order: Cycadales
- Family: Zamiaceae
- Genus: Zamia
- Species: Z. manicata

Binomial name
- Zamia manicata Linden ex Regel

Synonyms
- Z. madida

= Zamia manicata =

Species of cycad

Zamia manicata is a species of plant in the family Zamiaceae. It is found in Colombia (Choco Department and Antioquia Department) and Panama (Darien Province). Its natural habitat is subtropical or tropical moist lowland forests.

== Description ==
The stem is subterranean, rounded to sub-cylindrical, 5 to 10 centimetres (2.0 to 3.9 in) in diameter. The three to ten compound-leaves on each plant are 0.5 to 2 metres (1 ft 8 in to 6 ft 7 in) long, with a 0.2 to 1 metre (7.9 in to 3 ft 3.4 in) long petiole (stalk). The stalk is lightly to very heavily covered with prickles, which may extend into the lower third of the leaf axis. Leaflets are oblong to long-elliptic, toothed along the outer third of their margins, and 15 to 35 centimetres (5.9 to 13.8 in) long and 3 to 7 centimetres (1.2 to 2.8 in) wide in the middle of the leaf. Leaflets are attached to the leaf axis by a petiolule (a short petiole) with a gland-like collar at the base, a feature unique among cycads.

Like all Zamias, Z. manicata is dioecious, with each plant being either male or female. Male strobili (cones) are cylindrical, 4 to 6 centimetres (1.6 to 2.4 in) long and 1 to 1.5 centimetres (0.39 to 0.59 in) in diameter, cream to tan in color, and stand on 15 to 30 centimetres (5.9 to 11.8 in) long peduncles (stalks). Female cones are cylindrical to ovoid-cylindrical, 10 to 15 centimetres (3.9 to 5.9 in) long and 4 to 7 centimetres (1.6 to 2.8 in) in diameter, and wine-red to dark red-brown in color. Seeds are 1 to 1.5 centimetres (0.39 to 0.59 in) long and 0.5 to 0.8 centimetres (0.20 to 0.31 in) in diameter.

== Habitat ==
Z. manicata grows between 100 and 1,000 metres (330 and 3,280 ft) in rain forest, secondary forest, coffee plantations, and on the edges of pastures. It is found in Darien Province in Panama and adjacent Colombia.

== Phylogenetic history ==
Z. manicata is named for the collar around the base of each leaflet. It has been confused with Z. obliqua more than once. In 1932, Schuster placed Z. manicata as a synonym of Z. obliqua. In 1952 Schultes described Z. manicata as Z. madida, In 1982, Gomez published a description of Z. obliqua which actually described Z. manicata, and listed Z. manicata and Z. madida as synonyms of Z. obliqua. Z. obliqua differs from Z. manicata in having a tall upright stem, shorter leaflets, male cones on much shorter stalks, and female cones much lighter in color.

Z. manicata is the namesake for the Manicata clade, which includes several species found in northern Colombia.

== Sources ==
- Calonje, Michael; Castro Hernández, Jonatan; Coca, Luis Fernando; Jaramillo, Daniel; Aristizábal, Arturo (16 April 2021). "Two new species of Zamia (Zamiaceae, Cycadales) from the Magdalena-Urabá moist forests ecoregion of northern Colombia". Phytotaxa. 497 (1): 1–19. doi:10.11646/phytotaxa.497.1.1. ISSN 1179-3163.
- Stevenson, Dennis Wm. (April 2004). "Cycads of Colombia". The Botanical Review. 70 (2): 194–234. doi:10.1663/0006-8101(2004)070[0194:COC]2.0.CO;2. ISSN 1874-9372.
