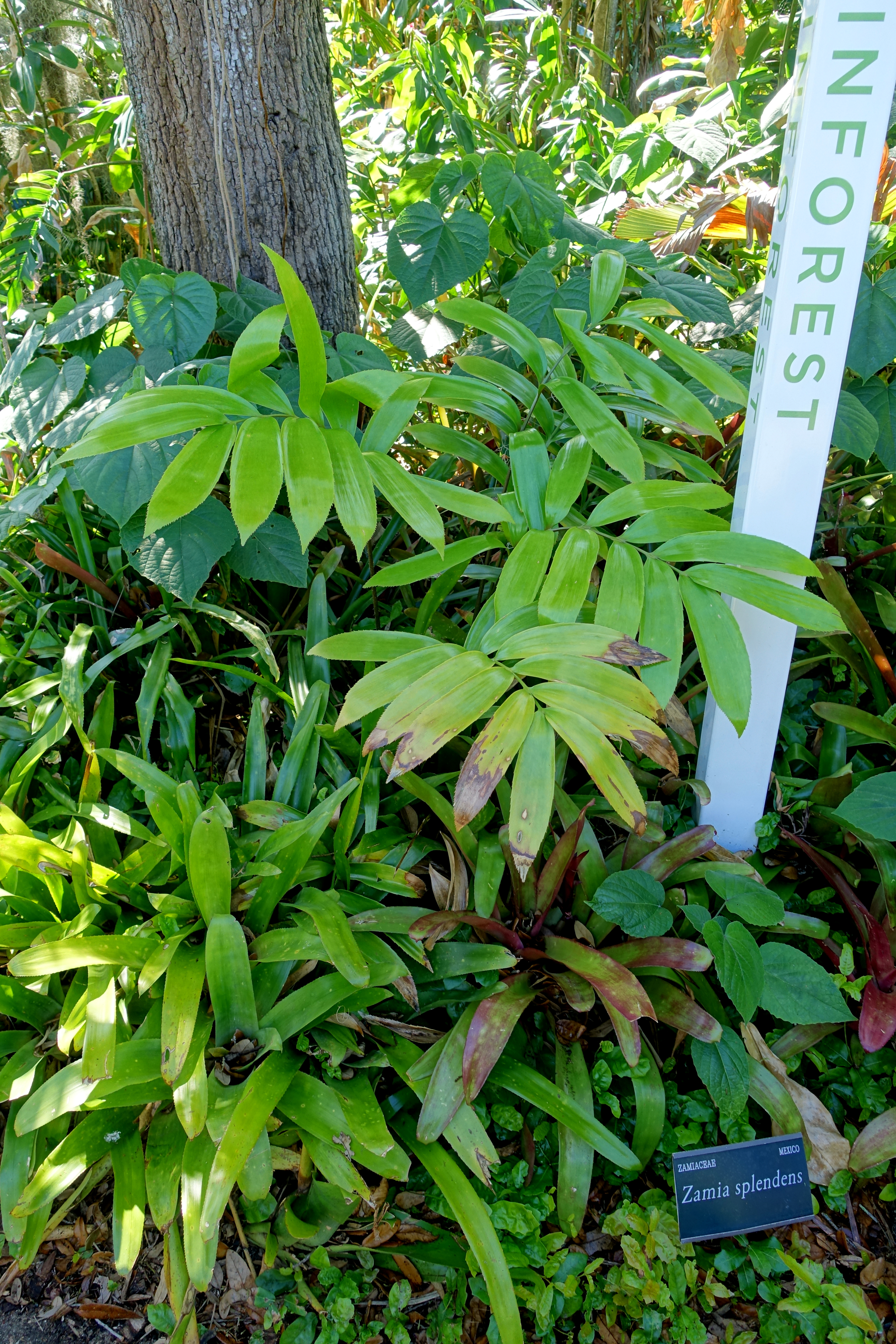

Scientific classification
- Kingdom: Plantae
- Clade: Tracheophytes
- Clade: Gymnospermae
- Division: Cycadophyta
- Class: Cycadopsida
- Order: Cycadales
- Family: Zamiaceae
- Genus: Zamia
- Species: Z. verschaffeltii

Binomial name
- Zamia verschaffeltii Miq.

= Zamia verschaffeltii =

Species of cycad

Zamia verschaffeltii is a species of plant in the family Zamiaceae. It is endemic to Mexico.

There has been confusion on the taxonomic treatment of Z. verschaffeltii, Z katzeriana, and Z. splendens. Some authors have placed Z. splendens and Z katzeriana as synonyms of Z. verschaffeltii, while others have placed Z. verschaffeltii as a synonym of Z. muricata. Nicolalde-Morejón, et al. note that the holotype of Z. verschaffeltii is incomplete and ambiguous, and that the type site is not known. After an unsuccessful search for living specimens, the authors concluded that Z. verschaffeltii is extinct.

== Sources ==
- Nicolalde-Morejón, Fernando; Vovides, Andrew P.; Stevenson, Dennis W.; Sosa, Victoria (March 2008). "The identity of Zamia katzeriana and Z. verschaffeltii (Zamiaceae)". Brittonia. 60 (1): 38–48. doi:10.1007/s12228-008-9000-9. ISSN 1938-436X.
- Nicolalde-Morejón, Fernando; Vovides, Andrew P.; Stevenson, Dennis W. (9 December 2009). "Taxonomic revision of Zamia in Mega-Mexico". Brittonia. 61 (4): 301–335. doi:10.1007/s12228-009-9077-9. ISSN 0007-196X.
