= Zamia stenophyllidia =

Scientific classification
- Kingdom: Plantae
- Clade: Tracheophytes
- Clade: Gymnospermae
- Division: Cycadophyta
- Class: Cycadopsida
- Order: Cycadales
- Family: Zamiaceae
- Genus: Zamia
- Species: Z. stenophyllidia

Binomial name
- Zamia stenophyllidia Nic.-Mor., Mart.-Domínguez & D.W.Stev.

Species of cycad

Zamia stenophyllida is a species of plant in the Zamiaceae family of cycads. It is endemic to Michoacán, Mexico, with only two populations known. Its conservation status has not been evaluated.

== Etymology ==
The epithet stenophyllidia is derived from the Greek stenós ("narrow"), referring to the narrow width of the leaves.

== Phylogenetic history ==
Zamia stenophyllidia was recognized as a distinct species during a review of wild populations and herbarium specimens attributed to Zamia paucijuga, a highly variable species found along about 1,200 kilometres (750 mi) of the Pacific coast of Mexico, from Nayarit to Oaxaca. It has been accepted as a valid species by the World List of Cycads, Plants of the World Online (Kew Gardens), and the World Flora Online.

== Description ==
The stem grows underground and is 5 to 45 centimetres (2.0 to 17.7 in) long and 4 to 8 centimetres (1.6 to 3.1 in) in diameter. Cataphylls (modified leaves that protect the base of the true leaves) are papery with stipules (small appendages) at the base, 6.4 centimetres (2.5 in) long, with a 2.5 centimetres (0.98 in) wide triangular base and a bristle or awn at the tip. The cataphylls are brown-yellowish and covered with hairs. There are two to three erect compound-leaves on the crown of the stem, 45 to 88 centimetres (18 to 35 in) long and 35.6 to 71 centimetres (14.0 to 28.0 in) wide. Leaves emerge greenish in color and covered with reddish-brown trichomes (hairs). The petiole (leaf stalk) is 30 to 52.6 centimetres (11.8 to 20.7 in) long, green in young leaves, with prickles up to 2 millimetres (0.079 in) long. The rachis (leaf shaft) is up to 48 centimetres (19 in) long with small prickles on the lower third. There 28 to 34 pairs of leaflets on a leaf. The papery leaflets are 29 to 36 centimetres (11 to 14 in) long and 0.6 to 0.8 centimetres (0.24 to 0.31 in) wide and attached directly to the stalk. The leaflets have a concave tapering to a symmetrical point, and taper down at the base. There is some fine notching on the upper margins of the leaflet.

Like all cycads, Zamia stenophyllidia is dioecious, with individual plants being either male or female. There are usually two or three male strobili (cones) on a plant. They are cylindrical, 7.5 to 10.5 centimetres (3.0 to 4.1 in) tall and 2.3 to 2.8 centimetres (0.91 to 1.10 in) in diameter, and brown-yellowish. They sit on erect peduncles 7.9 to 11.3 centimetres (3.1 to 4.4 in) tall and 0.5 to 0.7 centimetres (0.20 to 0.28 in) in diameter. There is only one female strobilus on a plant. They are ovoid, 6.0 to 7.1 centimetres (2.4 to 2.8 in) tall, 5 to 6 centimetres (2.0 to 2.4 in) in diameter, yellowish in color, and covered in hairs. They sit on peduncles 3.8 centimetres (1.5 in) tall and 1.4 centimetres (0.55 in) in diameter, are yellowish in color and covered with hairs. The seeds are ovoid, 1.2 to 1.5 centimetres (0.47 to 0.59 in) long and 0.9 to 1.1 centimetres (0.35 to 0.43 in) in diameter. The sarcotesta (seed covering) is smooth, yellow when immature, turning red with maturity.

== Distribution and habitat ==
Zamia stenophyllidia is endemic to Michoacán, Mexico, and has been found at two localities in Arteaga Municipality. The two known populations are located in the Balsas River basin, in oak forest on clay soils, and at an elevation of 450 to 600 metres (1,480 to 1,970 ft). The Köppen climate type is Awoi (tropical savanna with dry winters), with an annual average temperature of 22.9 °C (73.2 °F) and rainfall of 903.3 millimetres (35.56 in). Both populations have abundant plants and seedlings, and strobili (reproductive cones) and seeds are found on many plants, suggesting that the two populations are reproducing.

== Sources ==
- Nicolalde‐Morejón, Fernando; Martínez‐Domínguez, Lilí; Stevenson, Dennis Wm.; Vergara‐Silva, Francisco (September 2019). "Disentangling the identity of Zamia from Mexican Pacific seaboard, with a description of a new species". Nordic Journal of Botany. 37 (9). doi:10.1111/njb.02430. ISSN 0107-055X.
