= Zamia stricta =

Conservation status
- Vulnerable (IUCN 3.1)

Scientific classification
- Kingdom: Plantae
- Clade: Tracheophytes
- Clade: Gymnospermae
- Division: Cycadophyta
- Class: Cycadopsida
- Order: Cycadales
- Family: Zamiaceae
- Genus: Zamia
- Species: Z. stricta

Binomial name
- Zamia stricta Miq.

Species of cycad

Zamia stricta is a species of cycad in the family Zamiaceae. It is endemic to Cuba.

Z. stricta is part of the Zamia pumila species complex.
