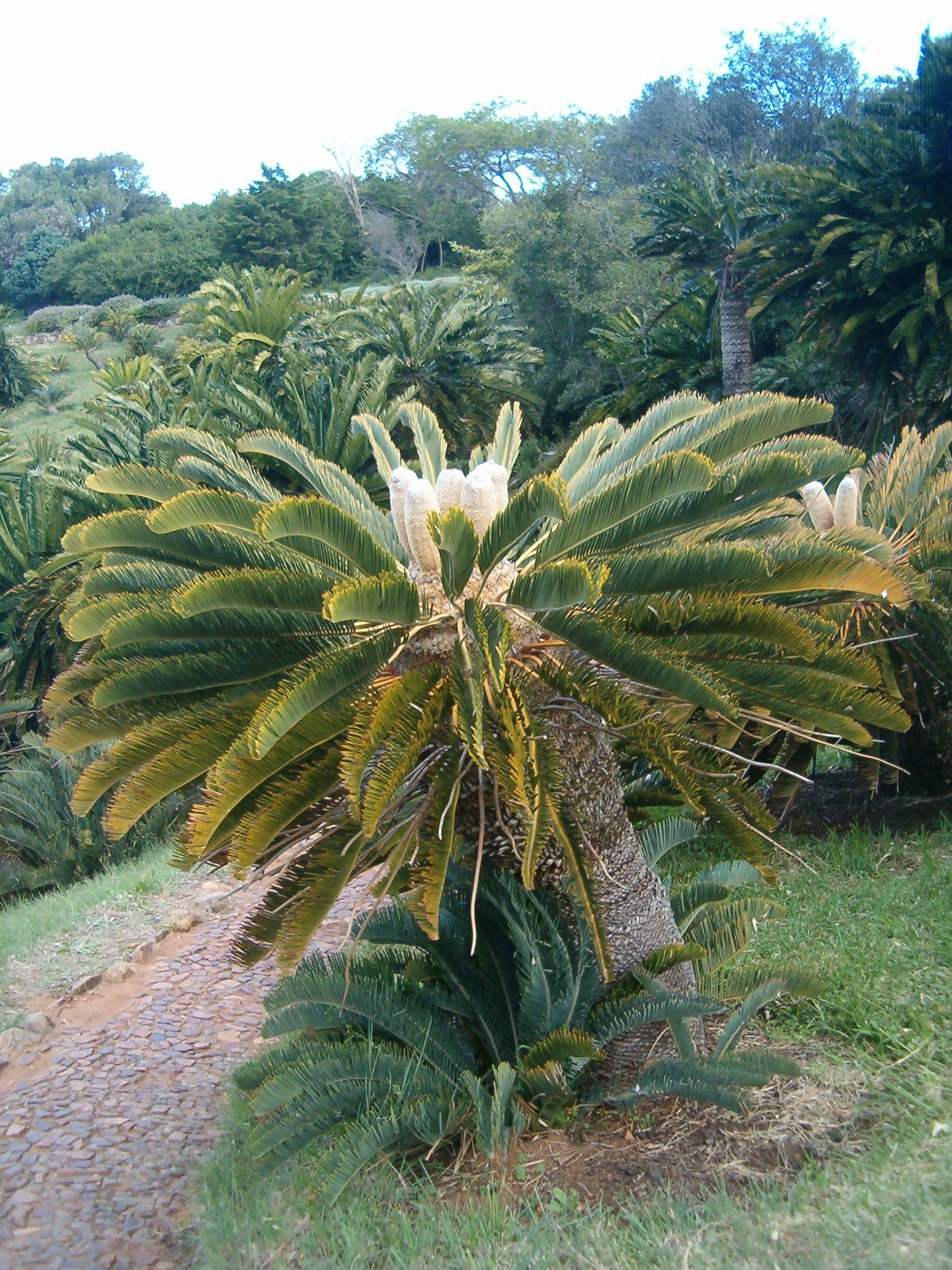

Conservation status
- Near Threatened (IUCN 3.1)
- CITES Appendix I (CITES)

Scientific classification
- Kingdom: Plantae
- Clade: Tracheophytes
- Clade: Gymnospermae
- Division: Cycadophyta
- Class: Cycadopsida
- Order: Cycadales
- Family: Zamiaceae
- Genus: Encephalartos
- Species: E. friderici-guilielmi

Binomial name
- Encephalartos friderici-guilielmi Lehm.

Synonyms
- Encephalartos cycadifolius var. friderici-guilielmi (Lehm.) Regel; Zamia friderici-guilielmi (Lehm.) Heynh.

= Encephalartos friderici-guilielmi =

White-haired cycad

Species of cycad

Encephalartos friderici-guilielmi is a species of cycad in the family Zamiaceae. It is sometimes referred to by the common name White-haired Cycad. It is native to Eastern Cape province and KwaZulu-Natal province of South Africa at elevations of 700 up to 1400 meters.

== Description ==
The cycad has tree-shaped trunks that grow up to 4 meters tall and 35 to 60 centimeters wide. Its open crown is woolly brown. The leaves, which are 1 to 1.5 meters long and 18 to 20 centimeters wide, spread horizontally from the trunk. They are stiff, straight, or slightly curved, with young leaves being silvery and becoming yellowish with age. The petiole, which is 17 to 30 centimeters long, is bare and circular in cross-section. The leaflets are tightly arranged, with the upper ones overlapping and the middle ones measuring 10 to 17 centimeters long and 7 to 8 millimeters wide. At the base of the leaflets, 7 to 9 prominent veins are visible, and the leaf margin is not serrated, but the leaf tip has a sharp thorn.

The female cones are barrel-shaped, 25 to 30 centimeters long and 15 to 20 centimeters in diameter, often covered in yellow-gray to brown wool. They can be single or up to six in number. The sporophylls are 4.5 to 5 centimeters long, with a flat side and a nearly smooth surface under the wool. The sarcotesta of the seed is pale yellow to pale yellow-orange, while the sclerotesta is medium brown with distinct longitudinal furrows, 24 to 33 millimeters long and 16 to 20 millimeters in diameter.

The male cones are cylindrical, 20 to 40 centimeters long and 6 to 10 centimeters in diameter, covered in brown wool. They appear in groups of third to twelfth. The sporophylls are 25 to 28 millimeters long, with a side facing the stem that is 7 millimeters high and 17 to 20 millimeters wide, with a beak about 5 millimeters long. The sporangia form a single spot with a large sterile area at the base and the tip of the sporophyll.

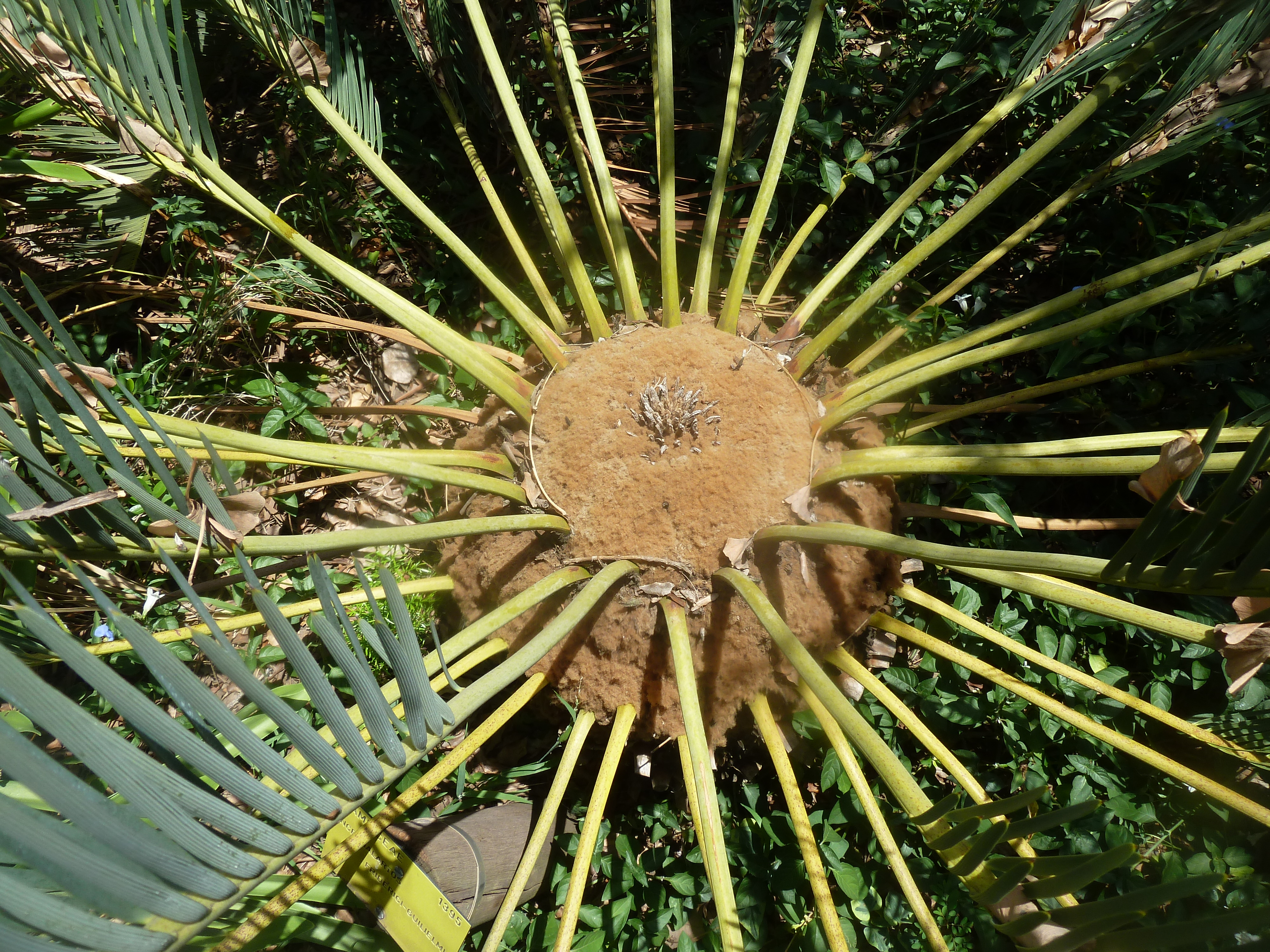
Crown of the stem

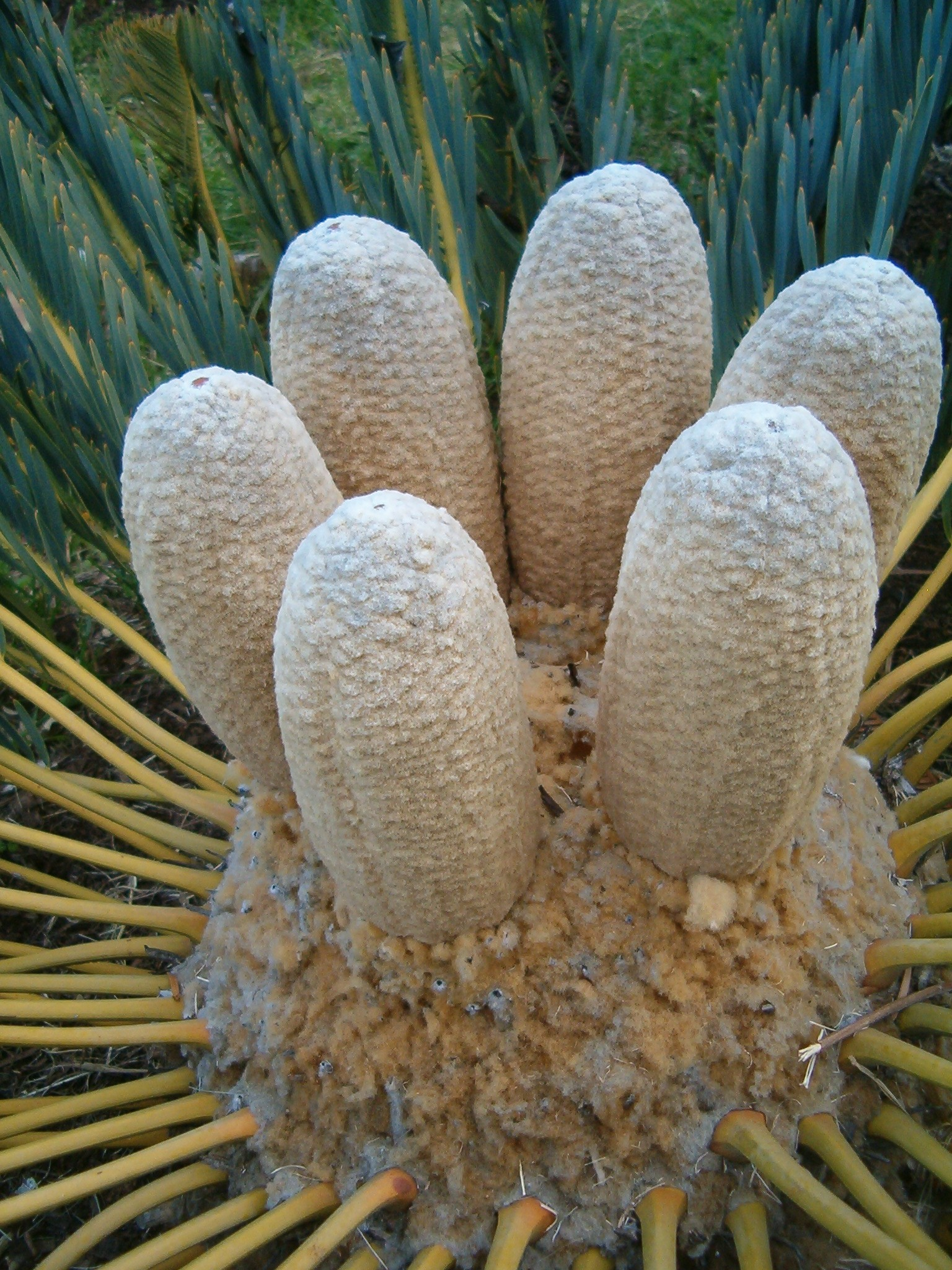
Cones

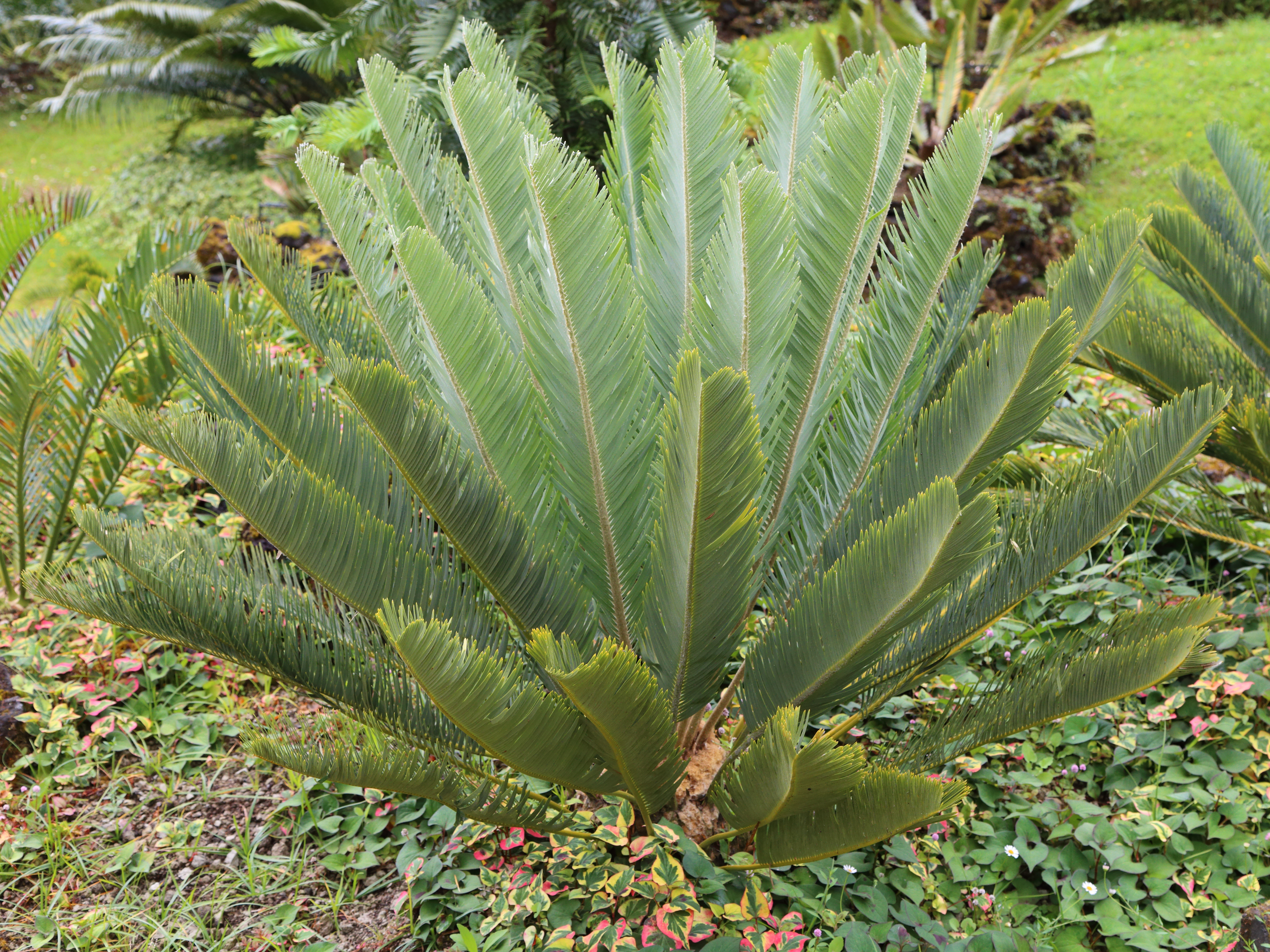
Leaves
