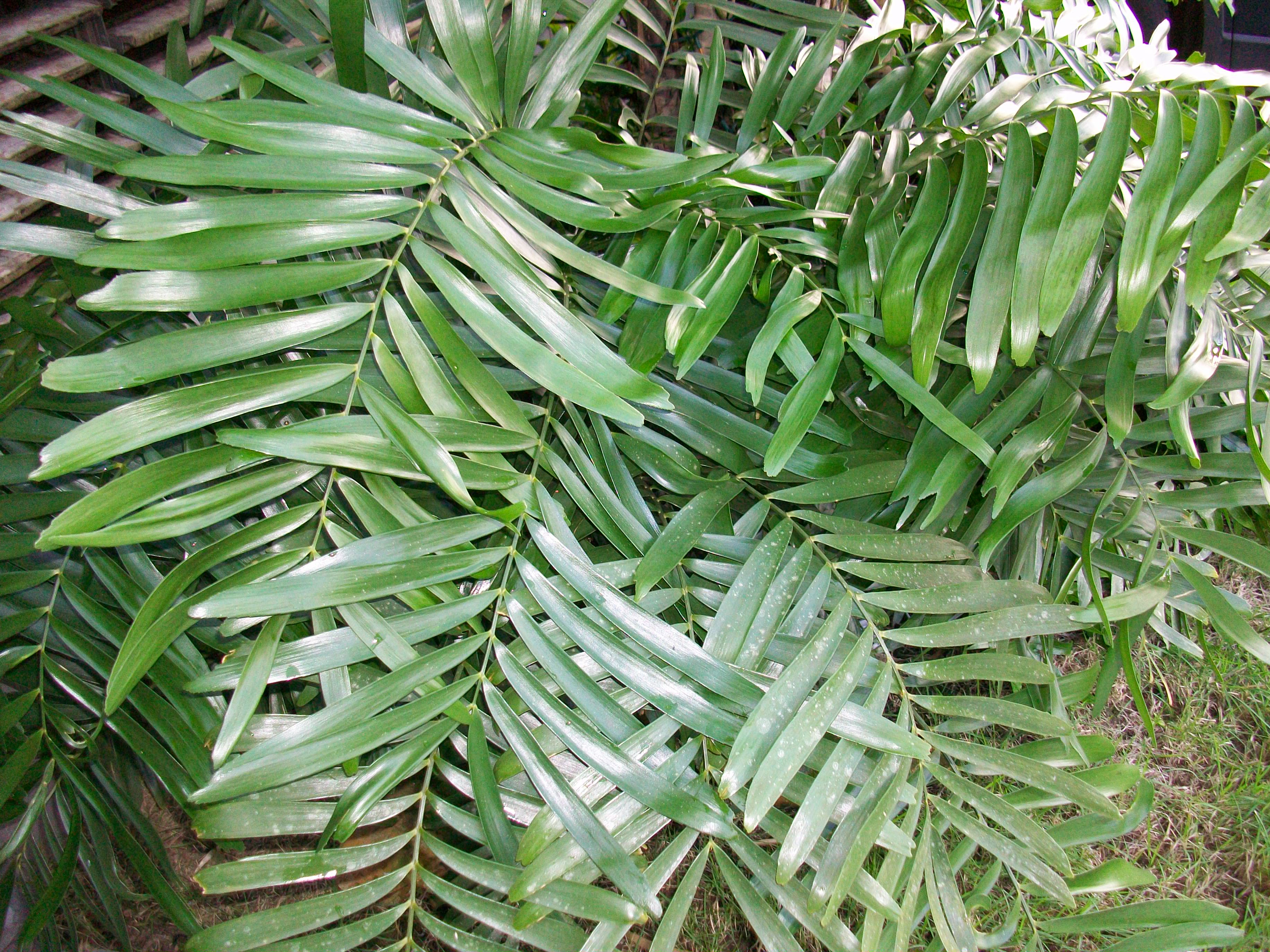

Conservation status
- Vulnerable (IUCN 3.1)

Scientific classification
- Kingdom: Plantae
- Clade: Embryophytes
- Clade: Tracheophytes
- Clade: Gymnosperms
- Division: Cycadophyta
- Class: Cycadopsida
- Order: Cycadales
- Family: Zamiaceae
- Genus: Zamia
- Species: Z. erosa

Binomial name
- Zamia erosa O.F.Cook & G.N.Collins

Synonyms
- Zamia amblyphyllidia D.W.Stev.

= Zamia erosa =

Species of cycad

Zamia erosa (also, Marunguay) is a species of cycad native to the Caribbean islands of Jamaica, Cuba, and Puerto Rico, described by Orator Fuller Cook and Guy N. Collins in 1903. The species formerly known as Z. amblyphyllidia (described in 1987) was determined in 2010 to be the same species as Z. erosa. It is listed as vulnerable by the IUCN Red List.

== Mutualism ==
The beetle Pharaxonotha portophylla is in an obligatory mutualistic relationship with Zamia erosa, living and breeding in male cones and consuming pollen and cone tissues while serving as a pollinating vector by transferring pollen to female cones.

== Phylogenetic history ==
The name Zamia erosa was first applied to a plant found south of Vega Baja, Puerto Rico (in north-central Puerto Rico) at the beginning of the 20th century. It was described as having a large fleshy root growing in crevices on forested limestone hills. It had only one or two leaves with broad leaflets with erose-toothed margins. In 1980 a specimen collected in South Central Purto Rico was designated as the lectotype for Z. erosa, and then placed in synonymy under Z. pumila subsp. pumila, a broadly defined species that included all Zamias in the Caribbean and Florida. It has been pointed out that the lectotype was collected 30 kilometres (19 mi) across the Cordillera Central from the site of the original type, that the leaflets on the lectotype were unlike the original description, being narrow, oblong, and with smooth margins at the tips, and that photographs on which the lectotype was based were labelled as Z. media.

A 1926 treatment assigned the name Z. media to plants in southern Puerto Rico that had narrow lanceolate leaflets, the name Z. latifoliolata to plants from northern Puerto Rico that had wider leaflets, and the name Z. portoricensis to plants from southwestern Puerto Rico that had narrower leaflets. That study also listed Z. erosa as a synonym of Z. latifoliolata. The type locality for Z. latifoliolata is in the Dominican Republic, but all zamias on Hispaniola, including the Dominican Republic, are now placed in Z. pumila, which also has populations in Cuba and Puerto Rico. By the late 1980s, three species of Zamia were recognized in Puerto Rico; Z. portoricensis in the southwest, with narrow leaflets, Z. amblyphyllidia in the north, with wide leaflets, and Z. pumila in south-central Puerto Rico, with leaflets of intermediate width.

While no specimens of the plant called Z. erosa by Cook & Collins has been found, two pages with photographs of plants labeled as Z. integrifolia with Z. erosa listed as a synonym have been found. The pages are dated 1899 and 1901, and the plants in the photographs match Cook & Collins' description of Z. erosa. Based on the photographs, and on inspection of Zamia plants growing in north-central and north-eastern Puerto Rico, including a site south of Vega Baja, presumably close the type site for Z. erosa, Calonje, Meerow, and Stevenson concluded that the plants are the Z. erosa of Cook & Collins, with that name taking precedence over Z. amblyphyllidia, and designated the photographs as the neotype for the species.

Molecular phylogenetics studies using DNA and transcriptomes have found Z. erosa in a clade with Z. portoricensis and Z. pumila, within the Zamia pumila species complex.

== Sources ==
- Calonje, Michael; Meerow, Alan W.; Stevenson, Dennis W. (2010). "The typification of Zamia erosa and the priority of that name over Z. amblyphyllidia". Taxon. 59 (2): 637–642. doi:10.1002/tax.592031. ISSN 0040-0262. JSTOR 25677624.
- Calonje, Michael; Meerow, Alan W.; Griffith, M. Patrick; Salas-Leiva, Dayana; Vovides, Andrew P.; Coiro, Mario; Francisco-Ortega, Javier (May 2019). "A Time-Calibrated Species Tree Phylogeny of the New World Cycad Genus Zamia L. (Zamiaceae, Cycadales)". International Journal of Plant Sciences. 180 (4): 286–314. doi:10.1086/702642. ISSN 1058-5893.
- Cook, O. F.; Collins, G. N. (1903). "Economic Plants of Puerto Rico" (PDF). Contributions from the United States National Herbarium. 8 (2): 57–269. JSTOR 23490917.
- Lindstrom, Anders; Habib, Sadaf; Dong, Shanshan; Gong, Yiqing; Liu, Jian; Calonje, Michael; Stevenson, Dennis; Zhang, Shouzhou (November 2024). "Transcriptome sequencing data provide a solid base to understand the phylogenetic relationships, biogeography and reticulated evolution of the genus Zamia L. (Cycadales: Zamiaceae)". Annals of Botany. 134 (5): 747–768. doi:10.1093/aob/mcae065. ISSN 0305-7364. PMC 11560380. PMID 38900840.
