= Zamia onan-reyesii =

Scientific classification
- Kingdom: Plantae
- Clade: Tracheophytes
- Clade: Gymnospermae
- Division: Cycadophyta
- Class: Cycadopsida
- Order: Cycadales
- Family: Zamiaceae
- Genus: Zamia
- Species: Z. onan-reyesii

Binomial name
- Zamia onan-reyesii C.Nelson & Sandoval

Species of cycad

Zamia onan-reyesii is a species of cycad in the family Zamiaceae endemic to Cortés Department, northern Honduras.

== Sources ==
- Nicolalde-Morejón, Fernando; Vovides, Andrew P.; Stevenson, Dennis W. (9 December 2009). "Taxonomic revision of Zamia in Mega-Mexico". Brittonia. 61 (4): 301–335. Bibcode:2009Britt..61..301N. doi:10.1007/s12228-009-9077-9. ISSN 0007-196X.
