= Zamia gomeziana =

Conservation status
- Near Threatened (IUCN 3.1)

Scientific classification
- Kingdom: Plantae
- Clade: Embryophytes
- Clade: Tracheophytes
- Clade: Spermatophytes
- Clade: Gymnospermae
- Division: Cycadophyta
- Class: Cycadopsida
- Order: Cycadales
- Family: Zamiaceae
- Genus: Zamia
- Species: Z. gomeziana

Binomial name
- Zamia gomeziana R.H.Acuña

Species of cycad

Zamia gomeziana is a species of cycad in the family Zamiaceae.
