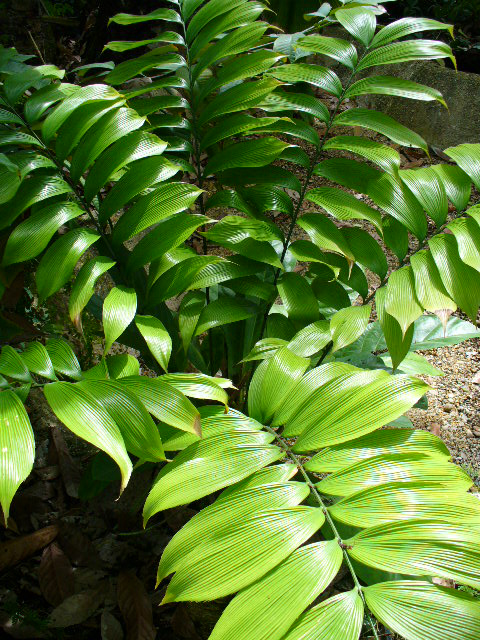

Conservation status
- Least Concern (IUCN 3.1)

Scientific classification
- Kingdom: Plantae
- Clade: Embryophytes
- Clade: Tracheophytes
- Clade: Spermatophytes
- Clade: Gymnospermae
- Division: Cycadophyta
- Class: Cycadopsida
- Order: Cycadales
- Family: Zamiaceae
- Genus: Zamia
- Species: Z. neurophyllidia

Binomial name
- Zamia neurophyllidia D.W.Stev.

= Zamia neurophyllidia =

Species of cycad

Zamia neurophyllidia is a species of plant in the family Zamiaceae. The original description was based on specimens found in Costa Rica, Nicaragua, and Panama. A more recent re-characterization of Z. neurophyllidia is based on a population found in the type locality in Bocas del Toro Province, Panama. It is part of the Zamia skinneri species complex.

== Classification history ==
D. W. Stevenson described Z. neurophyllidia in 1993 to include a population that had been regarded as a dwarf variety of Z. skinneri. He stated that Z. neurophyllidia was endemic to Panama, while Z. skinneri occurred from southern Nicaragua to northern Panama. In the 1990s, the World List of Cycads reported Z. neurophyllidia as occurring only in Panama. After 2000 the World List of Cycads changed the reported range of Z. neurophyllidia to include northern Panama, Costa Rica, and southern Nicaragua. A study published in 2004 proposed that Z. neurophyllidia and Z. skinneri were a "hybrid species complex". The 1993 description of Z. neurophyllidia by Stevenson was based on material from several locations, some of which had subsequently been assigned to other taxa. Taylor B. et al. (2008) re-characteized Z. neurophyllidia based solely on specimens from the type locality in Bocas del Toro Province, Panama.

== Description ==
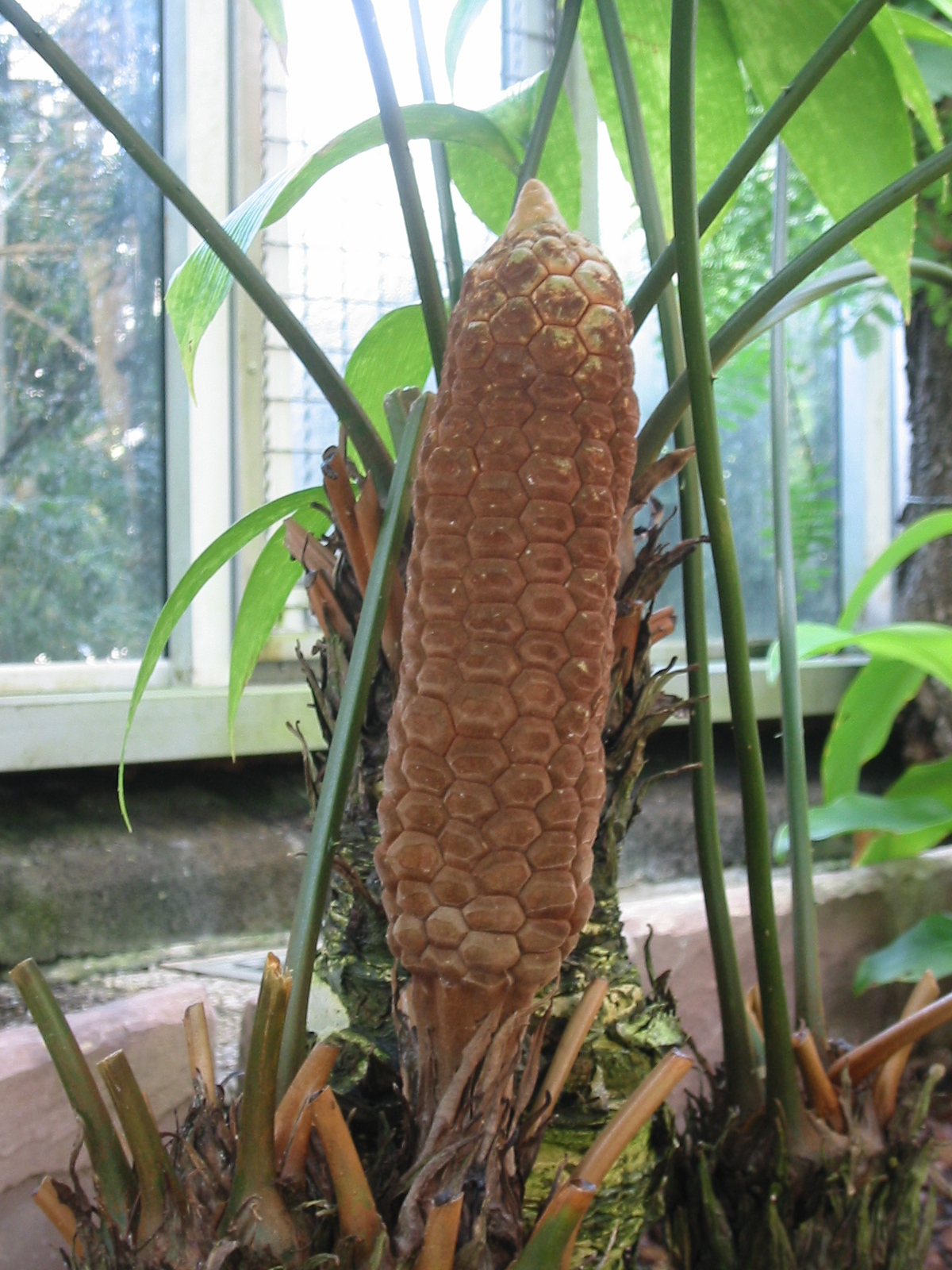
Female cone of Zamia neurophyllidia.

Z. neurophyllidia is a shrub or small tree, with a stem growing up to 1.5 to 2 metres (4 ft 11 in to 6 ft 7 in) tall and 5 to 12 centimetres (2.0 to 4.7 in) in diameter. Up to 22 leaves per crown are 61 to 180 centimetres (24 to 71 in) long, with 6 to 11 pairs of leaflets. Leaflets are elliptic to oblong-elliptic, pleated between veins, and with serrated edges. Leaflets along the middle of the stem are 20 to 31.3 centimetres (7.9 to 12.3 in) long and 6.1 to 10.5 centimetres (2.4 to 4.1 in) wide.

== Reproduction ==
Like all Zamias, Z. neurophyllidia is dioecious, with individual plants being male, with pollen cones, or female, with seed-bearing cones. Female cones (macrostrobili) are 13.2 to 20 centimetres (5.2 to 7.9 in) long and 5.7 to 7.2 centimetres (2.2 to 2.8 in) wide. They emerge covered in tan matted hair which matures into dark brown hairs over green to yellow-green megasporophylls. Seeds are 1.8 to 2.5 centimetres (0.71 to 0.98 in) long and 0.9 to 1.5 centimetres (0.35 to 0.59 in) wide. There are 110 to 220 seeds in a cone. The sarcotesta (seed coating) is bright red. Male cones (microstrobili) of the type variety had not been observed when Z. neurophyllidia was recharacterized by Taylor B. et al (2008).

== Mutualism ==
The beetle Pharaxonotha clarkorum is in an obligatory mutualistic relationship with Zamia neurophyllidia, living and breeding in male cones and consuming pollen and cone tissues while serving as a pollinating vector by transferring pollen to female cones.

== Distribution ==
Known populations of Z. neurophyllidia grow on steep hills in tropical deciduous forests along the Rio Changuinola in Bocas del Toro Province. Z. neurophyllidia may also occur in Costa Rica.

== Sources ==
- Taylor B., Alberto S.; Haynes, Jody L.; Holzman, Greg (2008). "Taxonomical, nomenclatural and biogeographical revelations in the Zamie skinneri complex of Central America (Cycadales; Zamiaceae)" (PDF). Botanical Journal of the Linnean Society. 158 (3): 399–429. doi:10.1111/j.1095-8339.2008.00886.x.
- Taylor B., Alberto S.; Haynes, Jody L.; Stevenson, Dennis W.; Holzman, Gregory; Mendieta, Jorge (2012). "Biogeographic Insights in Central American Cycad Biology" (PDF). In Stevens, Lawrence (ed.). Global Advances in Biogeography. Rejika, Croatia: InTechOpen. pp. 73–98. ISBN 978-953-51-0454-4.
