= Zamia poeppigiana =

Conservation status
- Near Threatened (IUCN 3.1)

Scientific classification
- Kingdom: Plantae
- Clade: Tracheophytes
- Clade: Gymnospermae
- Division: Cycadophyta
- Class: Cycadopsida
- Order: Cycadales
- Family: Zamiaceae
- Genus: Zamia
- Species: Z. poeppigiana

Binomial name
- Zamia poeppigiana Mart. & Eichler

Synonyms
- Palmifolium poeppigianum (Mart. & Eichler) Kuntze; Zamia baraquiniana T.Moore & Mast. Zamia parasitica Poepp. ex Eichler; Zamia wielandii J.Schust.

Species of cycad

Zamia poeppigiana is a species of plant in the Zamiaceae family. It is found in Colombia, Ecuador, and Peru. It is threatened by habitat loss.
