= Zamia lecointei =

Conservation status
- Near Threatened (IUCN 3.1)

Scientific classification
- Kingdom: Plantae
- Clade: Tracheophytes
- Clade: Gymnospermae
- Division: Cycadophyta
- Class: Cycadopsida
- Order: Cycadales
- Family: Zamiaceae
- Genus: Zamia
- Species: Z. lecointei

Binomial name
- Zamia lecointei Ducke

Synonyms
- Zamia ulei subsp. lecointei (Ducke) Ducke; Zamia jirijirimensis R.E.Schult. Zamia obidensis Ducke

Species of cycad

Zamia lecointei is a species of plant in the family Zamiaceae. It is found in Brazil, Colombia, Peru, and Venezuela. It is threatened by habitat loss.
