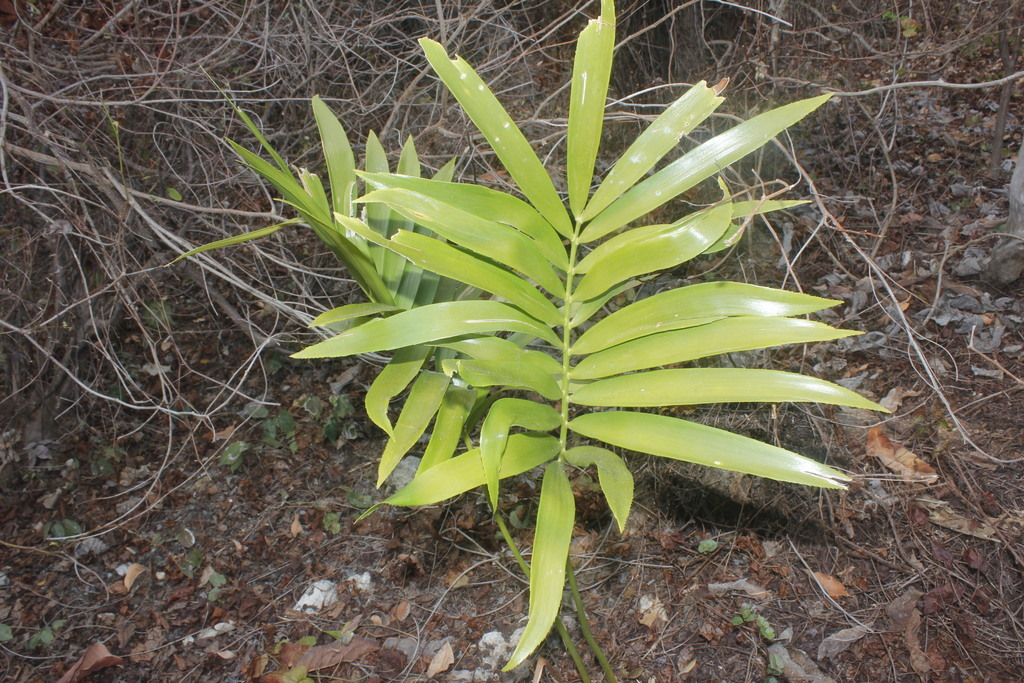

Conservation status
- Near Threatened (IUCN 3.1)

Scientific classification
- Kingdom: Plantae
- Clade: Tracheophytes
- Clade: Gymnospermae
- Division: Cycadophyta
- Class: Cycadopsida
- Order: Cycadales
- Family: Zamiaceae
- Genus: Zamia
- Species: Z. paucijuga

Binomial name
- Zamia paucijuga Wieland

= Zamia paucijuga =

Species of cycad

Zamia paucijuga is a species of plant in the cycad family Zamiaceae.

The cycad is endemic to southwestern and western Mexico. It is widely distributed along the Pacific Coast of Mexico and also on Maria Cleofas island. It is found in the states of Chiapas, Colima, Guerrero, Jalisco, Michoacán, Nayarit and Oaxaca.

It is threatened by habitat loss.

== Sources ==
- Nicolalde-Morejón, Fernando; Vovides, Andrew P.; Stevenson, Dennis W. (9 December 2009). "Taxonomic revision of Zamia in Mega-Mexico". Brittonia. 61 (4): 301–335. doi:10.1007/s12228-009-9077-9. ISSN 0007-196X.
