= Zamia spartea =

Conservation status
- Critically Endangered (IUCN 3.1)

Scientific classification
- Kingdom: Plantae
- Clade: Tracheophytes
- Clade: Gymnospermae
- Division: Cycadophyta
- Class: Cycadopsida
- Order: Cycadales
- Family: Zamiaceae
- Genus: Zamia
- Species: Z. spartea

Binomial name
- Zamia spartea A.DC.

Synonyms
- Palmifolium sparteum (A.DC.) Kuntze; Zamia loddigesii var. spartea (A.DC.) J.Schust.

Species of cycad

Zamia spartea is a species of plant in the family Zamiaceae. It is endemic to the southern Isthmus of Tehuantepec region of Oaxaca in southern Mexico. It is native to dry oak forest, dry deciduous forest, and hilly grassland from 200 to 400 meters elevation. It is threatened by habitat loss, and the IUCN Red List assesses the species as critically endangered.

== Sources ==
- Nicolalde-Morejón, Fernando; Vovides, Andrew P.; Stevenson, Dennis W. (9 December 2009). "Taxonomic revision of Zamia in Mega-Mexico". Brittonia. 61 (4): 301–335. doi:10.1007/s12228-009-9077-9. ISSN 0007-196X.
