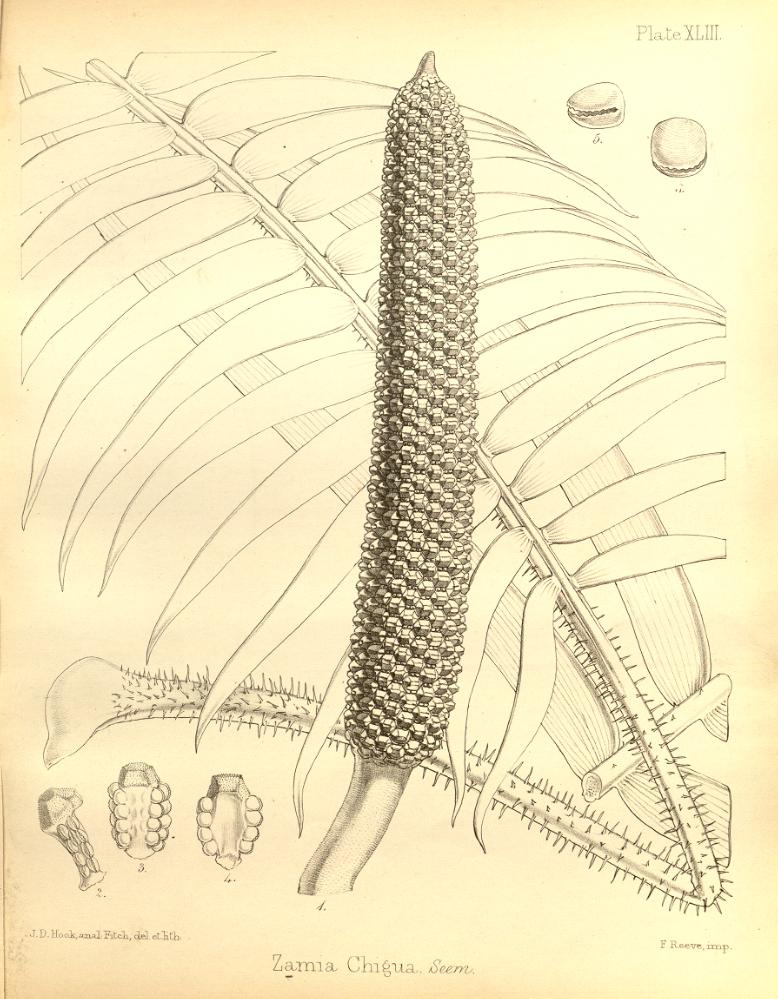
- Zamia chigua, Illustration.

Conservation status
- Near Threatened (IUCN 3.1)

Scientific classification
- Kingdom: Plantae
- Clade: Tracheophytes
- Clade: Gymnospermae
- Division: Cycadophyta
- Class: Cycadopsida
- Order: Cycadales
- Family: Zamiaceae
- Genus: Zamia
- Species: Z. chigua

Binomial name
- Zamia chigua Seem.

Synonyms
- Aulacophyllum ortgiesii Regel; Palmifolium chigua (Seem.) Kuntze; Zamia lindleyana H.L.Wendl.; Zamia princeps Hort.Bull ex Dyer; Zamia princeps Rob.

= Zamia chigua =

Species of cycad

Zamia chigua is a species of plant in the family Zamiaceae. It is found in Choco Department of Colombia and (Chiriquí Province) of Panama. Its natural habitat is subtropical or tropical moist lowland forests.

== Name ==
The specific name chigua is the common name for cycads employed by the indigenous peoples in Choco Province. This has caused some confusion in the naming of Zamia species, and in particular with Z. roezlii being mis-identified as Z. chigua and Z. chigua as Z. "helecho" in horticultural use.

== Description ==
Z. chigua grows as a small shrub or tree, with a wrinkled stem up to 2 metres (6 ft 7 in) tall and 15 centimetres (5.9 in) in diameter. There are 3 to 15 compound leaves at the apex of the stem. The leaves are 0.5 to 3 metres (1 ft 8 in to 9 ft 10 in) long on a petiole (stalk) up to 1 metre (3 ft 3 in) long. The stalk is densely covered with prickles. There are 30 to 80 leaflets per leaf, which are long lanceolate, and smooth along the edges of the leaflet. Leaflets in the middle of the leaf are 10 to 30 centimetres (3.9 to 11.8 in) long and 1 to 1.5 centimetres (0.39 to 0.59 in) wide.

Like all Zamias, Z. chigua is dioecious, with each plant being either male or female. Male strobili (cones) are cylindrical, 10 to 20 centimetres (3.9 to 7.9 in) long and 2 to 3 centimetres (0.79 to 1.18 in) in diameter, and cream to light-yellow in color. Female cones are narrow-ovoid to cylindrical, 20 to 30 centimetres (7.9 to 11.8 in) long and 8 to 12 centimetres (3.1 to 4.7 in) in diameter, and tan to light brown in color. Seeds are ovoid with a red sarcotesta (outer fleshy coat).

== Habitat ==
Z. chigua is common in Chiriquí Province in Panama at 600 to 1,200 metres (2,000 to 3,900 ft) elevation, and in Choco Department in Colombia in lowland rain forests. Stevenson states that Z. chigua probably grows on mountain slopes in Darien Province in Panama and in adjacent parts of Colombia, but had not been found there as of 2004. The only known threat to Z. chigua is habitat destruction.

== Sources ==
- Stevenson, Dennis Wm. (April 2004). "Cycads of Colombia". The Botanical Review. 70 (2): 194–234. doi:10.1663/0006-8101(2004)070[0194:COC]2.0.CO;2. ISSN 1874-9372.
