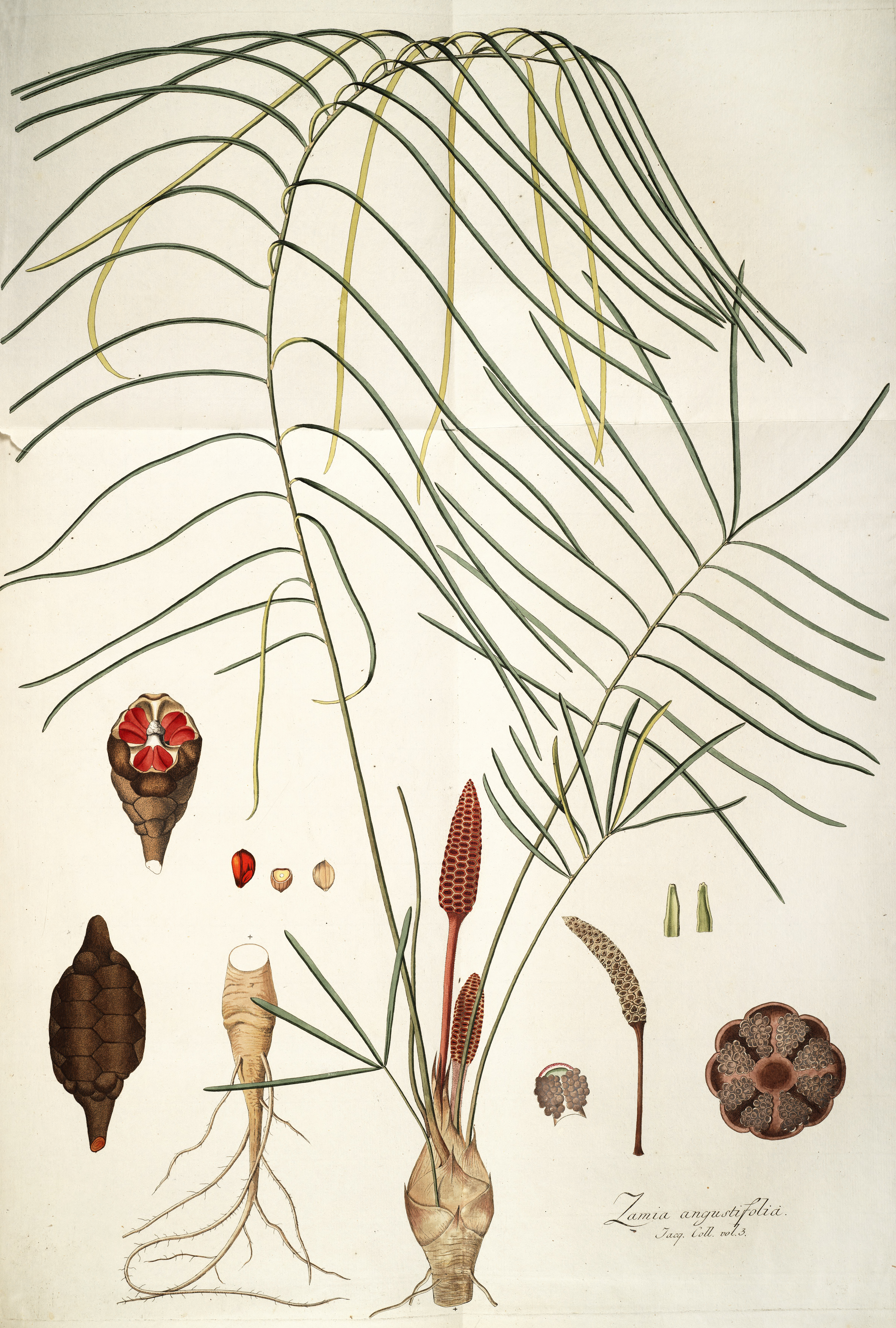
- Zamia angustifolia, Illustration.

Conservation status
- Vulnerable (IUCN 3.1)

Scientific classification
- Kingdom: Plantae
- Clade: Tracheophytes
- Clade: Gymnospermae
- Division: Cycadophyta
- Class: Cycadopsida
- Order: Cycadales
- Family: Zamiaceae
- Genus: Zamia
- Species: Z. angustifolia

Binomial name
- Zamia angustifolia Jacq.

Synonyms
- Palmifolium angustifolium (Jacq.) Kuntze; Palmifolium angustissimum (Miq.) Kuntze; Palmifolium multifoliatum (A.DC.) Kuntze; Palmifolium strictum (Miq.) Kuntze; Palmifolium yatesii (Miq.) Kuntze; Zamia angustifolia var. angustissima (Miq.) Regel; Zamia angustifolia var. stricta (Miq.) Regel; Zamia angustifolia var. yatesii (Miq.) Regel; Zamia angustissima Miq.; Zamia guggenheimiana Carabia; Zamia linearis Miq. ex J.Schust; Zamia linifolia Hort.Pawl ex Regel; Zamia multifoliolata A.DC.; Zamia yatesii Miq.

= Zamia angustifolia =

Species of cycad

Zamia angustifolia is a species of plant in the genus Zamia. It is found in the Bahamas, where it is threatened by habitat loss, and in Cuba, where it is abundant.

Z. angustifolia has dark gray to black strobili (cones) with acuminate points.

It is found in the Bahamas only at two sites on coastal sand dunes on Eleuthera. A survey in the early 2010s found only 150 plants. Z. integrifolia is also found on Eleuthera, but the two species ranges do not overlap. The limited number of plants and sites, and the development of nearby areas for housing create the highest concern for conservation of the Bahamian population of the species. Z. angustifolia is also found in semi-deciduous dry forests in eastern Cuba (Guantánamo, Oriente, and Santiago de Cuba provinces). It is abundant in Cuba, but the taxonomic relationship between the Bahamian and Cuban populations needs further study.

In 1889 Gardiner and Brace listed just one Zamia species in the Bahamas, Z. angustifolia, which they referred to as "bay rush". They reported that plants of the species were harvested on Andros and New Providence islands to produce starch sold in Nassau markets. As of 2024, the Zamia plants on Andros and New Providence islands are assigned to Z. integrifolia.

Z. angustifolia is part of the Zamia pumila species complex.

== Sources ==
- Calonje, Michael; Stevenson, Dennis Wm.; Osborne, Roy (2013). "The World List of Cycads" (PDF). Cycads. 5 (1): 77–119. Archived from the original (PDF) on 2024-06-20.
- Ward, Daniel B. (July 6, 2016). "Keys to the Flora of Florida - 32. Zamia (Zamiaceae)" (PDF). Phytologia. 98 (3): 170–178.
- Meerow, Alan W.; Stevenson, Dennis W.; Moynihan, Jeremy; Francisco-Ortega, Javier (2003). "Unlocking the Coontie Conundrum: The Potential of Microsatellite DNA Studies in the Caribbean Zamia pumila Complex (Zamiaceae". Memoirs of the New York Botanical Garden. 97: 484–518.
- Salas-Leiva, Dayana E.; Meerow, Alan W.; Calonje, Michael; Francisco-Ortega, Javier; Griffith, M. Patrick; Nakamura, Kyoko; Sánchez, Vanessa; Knowles, Lindy; Knowles, David (May 2017). "Shifting Quaternary migration patterns in the Bahamian archipelago: Evidence from the Zamia pumila complex at the northern limits of the Caribbean island biodiversity hotspot". American Journal of Botany. 104 (5): 757–771. doi:10.3732/ajb.1700054. ISSN 0002-9122. PMID 28515078.
