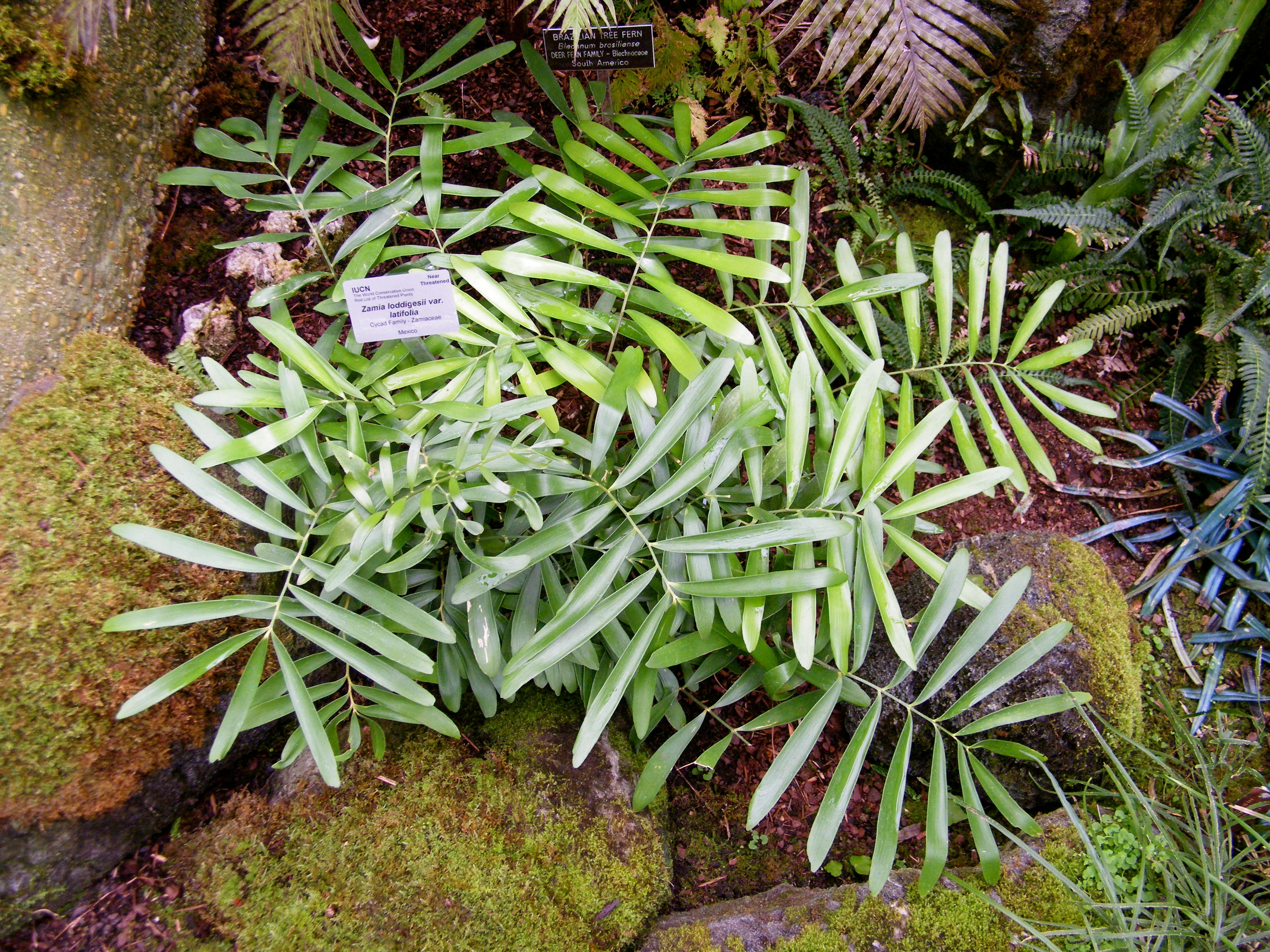

Conservation status
- Near Threatened (IUCN 3.1)

Scientific classification
- Kingdom: Plantae
- Clade: Tracheophytes
- Clade: Gymnosperms
- Division: Cycadophyta
- Class: Cycadopsida
- Order: Cycadales
- Family: Zamiaceae
- Genus: Zamia
- Species: Z. loddigesii

Binomial name
- Zamia loddigesii Miq.

Synonyms
- List: Zamia cycadifolia Dyer; Zamia galeotti De Vriese; Zamia leiboldii Miq.; Zamia leiboldii var. angustifolia Regel; Zamia leiboldii var. latifolia Regel; Zamia mexicana Miq.; Zamia sylvatica Chamberlain; Former synonym Zamia lawsoniana Dyer reclassified in 2024

= Zamia loddigesii =

Species of cycad

Zamia loddigesii, also known as teocinte, is a species of plant in the family Zamiaceae. It is found in Hidalgo, Oaxaca, Tamaulipas, and Veracruz states in Mexico. It is threatened by habitat loss.

== Description ==
The stem is subterranean, with older ones branching. The stem is 10 to 45 centimetres (3.9 to 17.7 in) long and 8 to 15 centimetres (3.1 to 5.9 in) in diameter. There are two or three compound leaves on a stem apex, standing upright or spreading out. Leaves are 45 to 96 centimetres (18 to 38 in) long and 30 to 41 centimetres (12 to 16 in) wide. They emerge a light-green, turning to green or dark green as they mature. The petiole (leaf stalk) is 15 to 25 centimetres (5.9 to 9.8 in) long, with prickles up 4 4 millimetres (0.16 in) long. The rachis (leaf midrib) is up to 57 centimetres (22 in) long, with a few prickles on the lower third of its length. There are 12 to 23 pairs of leaflets on a leaf. Median leaflets are 16 to 26 centimetres (6.3 to 10.2 in) long and 1.8 to 3.1 centimetres (0.71 to 1.22 in) wide.

Like all cycads, Zamia loddigesii is dioecious, with individual plants being either male or female. There are one or two male strobili (male cones) on a stem apex, up to six cones on a plant with multiple apices. Cones are erect, cylindrical, and 8 to 14 centimetres (3.1 to 5.5 in) long and 1.8 to 3.5 centimetres (0.71 to 1.38 in) in diameter. They are light-brown and covered in hair. The peduncles (cone stalks) are also light-brown and covernered in hair. They are 6 centimetres (2.4 in) and 1.2 centimetres (0.47 in) in diameter. There are one or two female strobili on a crown. They are erect, ellipsoid to conical, up to 16 centimetres (6.3 in) tall and up to 6 centimetres (2.4 in) in diameter. The cones are beige and covered with hair. The Peduncle is up to 6 centimetres (2.4 in) long and 1.6 centimetres (0.63 in) in diameter, brown and covered with hair. Seed are ovoid, 1.4 to 1.8 centimetres (0.55 to 0.71 in)long and 0.8 to 1 centimetre (0.31 to 0.39 in) in diameter. The sarcotesta (seed coat) is smooth, pink when immature, turning red with maturity.

== Distribution ==
Zamia loddigesii is found in Hidalgo, Oaxaca, Tamaulipas, and Veracruz states in Mexico. Populations of Zamia loddigesii are highly fragmented, with much of its habitat in tropical dry forests that have been cleared for agriculture and cattle pasture, and is subject to frequent fires.

== Genetic diversity ==
A 2003 study of populations of Z. loddigesii from Tabasco (since reclassified as Z. lawsoniana), southern Veracruz, central Veracruz, and Tamaulipas states in Mexico found that Z. loddigesii had a relatively high genetic diversity compared to tropical trees and to other cycad species, with genetic differences clustering at geographical locations.

== Conservation ==
As pollination in Zamia loddigesii, as in all cycads, is performed by insects with poor flying ability, and there is no vector for general widespread seed dispersal, there is little or no gene flow between isolated populations. It also appears that only a few plants in each population are reproductively active, and recruitment of seedlings is low.

The primary threat to Zamia loddigesii is habitat loss, primarily due to human activities.

== Sources ==
- González-Astorga, Jorge; Vovides, Andrew P.; Octavio-Aguilar, Pablo; Aguirre-Fey, Daniel; Nicolalde-Morejón, Fernando; Iglesias, Carlos (15 December 2006). "Genetic diversity and structure of the cycad Zamia loddigesii Miq. (Zamiaceae): implications for evolution and conservation". Botanical Journal of the Linnean Society. 152 (4): 533–544. doi:10.1111/j.1095-8339.2006.00579.x. ISSN 0024-4074.
- Nicolalde-Morejón, Fernando; Martínez-Domínguez, Lilí; González-Aguilar, Marlon Aramis; Stevenson, Dennis Wm. (2024). "Reestablishment of Zamia lawsoniana (Zamiaceae, Cycadales), an endemic species of Mexico, with first description of the ovulate strobilus". Acta Botánica Mexicana. 131 (e2262). doi:10.21829/abm131.2024.2262. ISSN 0187-7151.
- Nicolalde-Morejón, Fernando; Vovides, Andrew P.; Stevenson, Dennis W. (9 December 2009). "Taxonomic revision of Zamia in Mega-Mexico". Brittonia. 61 (4): 301–335. doi:10.1007/s12228-009-9077-9. ISSN 0007-196X.
