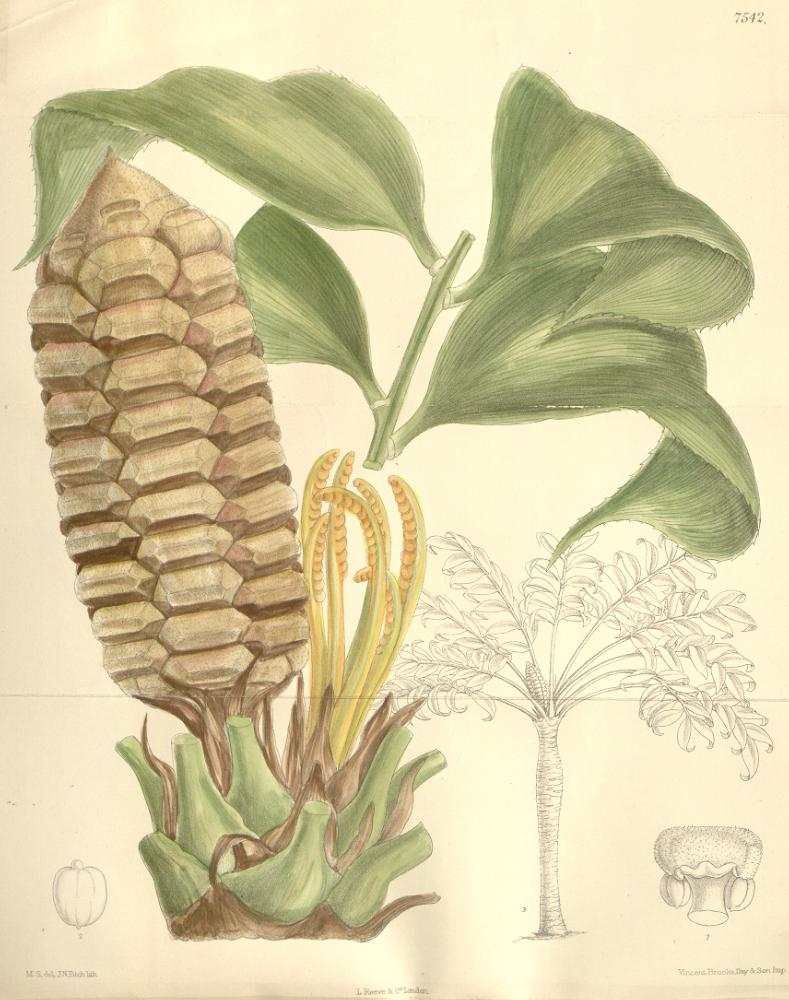
- Zamia obliqua, Illustration.

Conservation status
- Least Concern (IUCN 3.1)

Scientific classification
- Kingdom: Plantae
- Clade: Embryophytes
- Clade: Tracheophytes
- Clade: Gymnosperms
- Division: Cycadophyta
- Class: Cycadopsida
- Order: Cycadales
- Family: Zamiaceae
- Genus: Zamia
- Species: Z. obliqua

Binomial name
- Zamia obliqua A.Braun

= Zamia obliqua =

Species of plant

Zamia obliqua is a species of plant in the family Zamiaceae. A common name is "chigua". It is found in Colombia and Panama. Its natural habitat is subtropical or tropical moist lowland forests. It is threatened by habitat loss.
