= Zamia muricata =

Conservation status
- Near Threatened (IUCN 3.1)

Scientific classification
- Kingdom: Plantae
- Clade: Tracheophytes
- Clade: Gymnospermae
- Division: Cycadophyta
- Class: Cycadopsida
- Order: Cycadales
- Family: Zamiaceae
- Genus: Zamia
- Species: Z. muricata

Binomial name
- Zamia muricata Willd.

Species of cycad

Zamia muricata is a species of plant in the family Zamiaceae. It is found in Colombia and Venezuela. It is threatened by habitat loss.
