= Cataphyll =

In plants, a reduced, small leaf

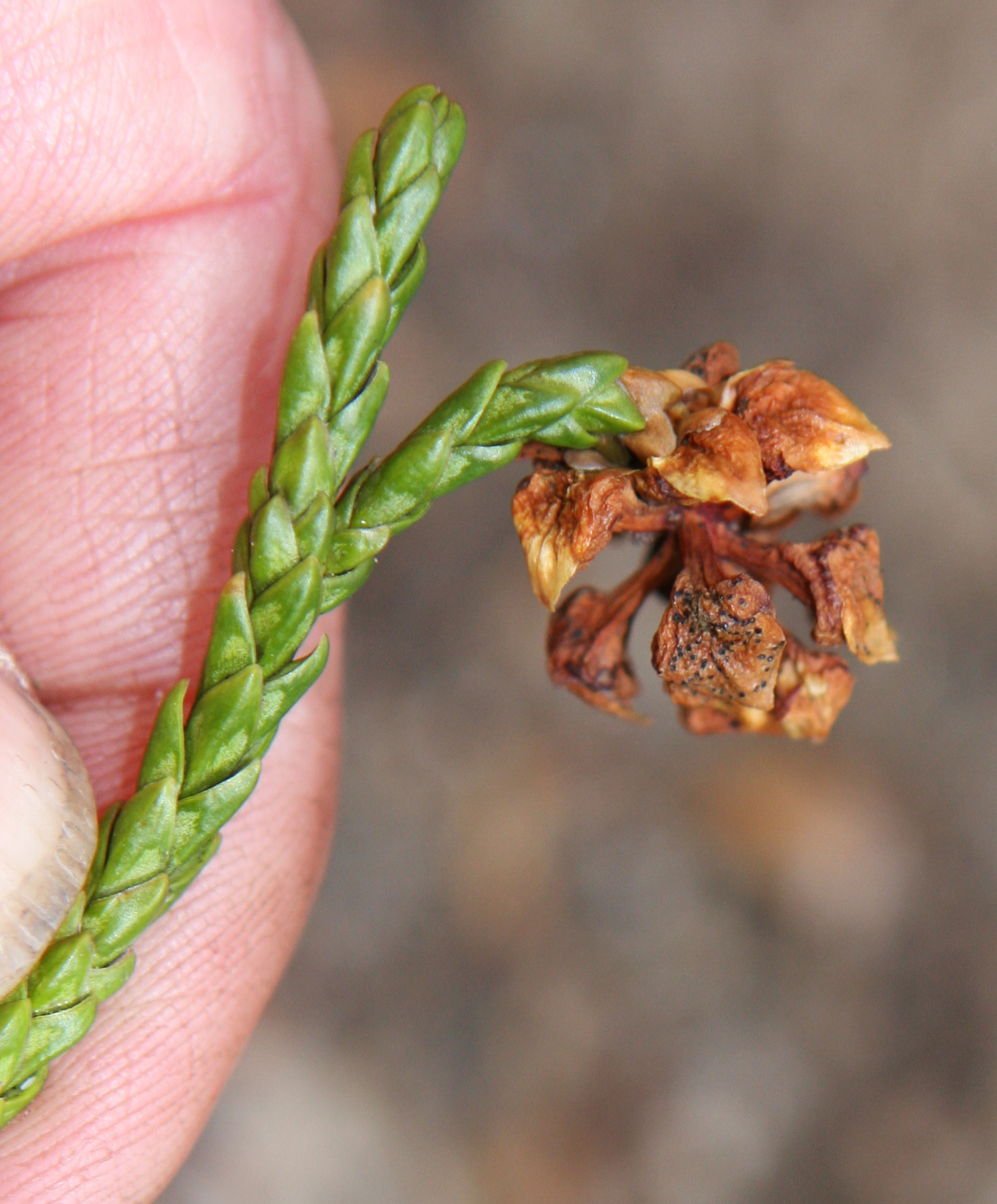
The stems of Athrotaxis are covered with small flat pointed leaves called "scale leaves" or "cataphylls".

In plant morphology, a cataphyll (sometimes also called a cataphyllum or cataphyll leaf) is a reduced, small leaf. Many plants have both "true leaves" (euphylls), which perform most of the photosynthesis, and cataphylls, which are modified to perform other functions.

Cataphylls include bracts, bracteoles and bud scales, as well as any small leaves that resemble scales, known as scale leaves. The functions of cataphylls, such as bud scales, may be short-lived, and they are often shed after their function is fulfilled.

== Etymology ==
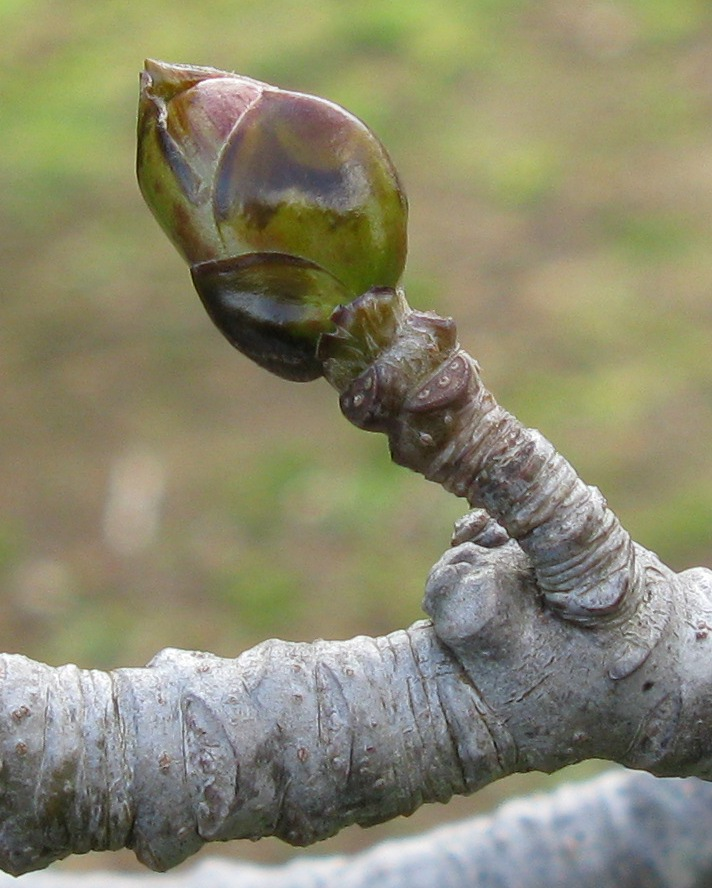
Leaf bud of American Sweet gum (Liquidambar styraciflua); the cataphylls covering the bud show a little chlorophyll, but they shed instead of growing into photosynthetic leaves.

Cataphyll comes from the Ancient Greek κατά ("kata"), meaning "down", and φύλλον ("phyllon"), meaning "leaf".

== Forms ==
In some cases, cataphylls perform a transient function, after which they die and may shed. Those that shed early are said to be caducous. The sepals of Papaver species are shed during the very opening of the petals and are a dramatic example of caducous leaves.

Cataphylls can have many other forms. Some, such as spines, corm-scales, and bud-scales, may be persistent but may not perform their major function until they die, whether or not they are physically shed. Examples of various kinds of living cataphylls include bulb-scales, rhizome-scales, cotyledons, and scaly bracts. Several of these occur in various forms and contexts. For example, bud scales occur on numerous kinds of leaf or branch buds, as well as on flower buds.

Protective masses of dead leaves encircle the stems of some species of palm trees or aloes, but those are not usually regarded as cataphylls because their primary function while alive is photosynthesis.

=== Cotyledons as cataphylls ===
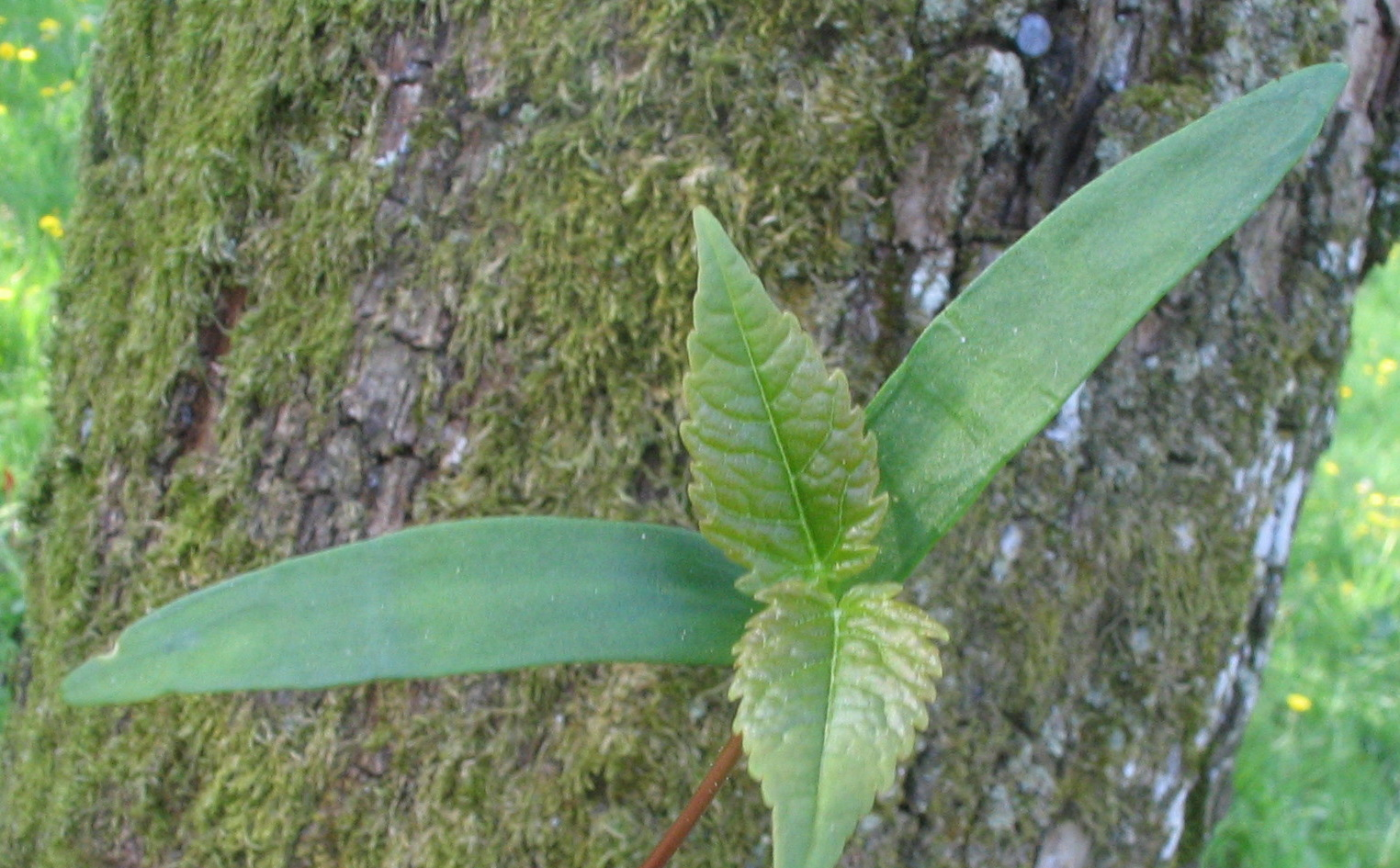
Acer pseudoplatanus seedling showing cotyledons that supplied the first photosynthetic function for the growing plant. They will soon drop off after the young leaves grow large enough to take over.

Cotyledons are widely regarded as a class of cataphyll, though many kinds of cotyledons function as living tissue and remain alive until, at least, the end of their function, at which time they wither and may drop off. They begin as leaf rudiments. Many kinds accumulate nutrient materials for storage, starting to give up their stored material as the plant germinates. Some, such as the cotyledons of many legumes, conifers, and cucurbits, develop chlorophyll and perform the first photosynthesis for the germinating plant.

=== Corm scales ===
Like bulb-scales, corm scales are largely the basal parts of the photosynthetic leaves that show up above ground. Some species of cormous plants, such as some Lapeirousia, also produce cataphylls that act solely as tunic leaves for the corm. Unlike bulb-scales, however, the corm tunic has no significant storage function; that task is left to the parenchyma of the cortex of the corm.

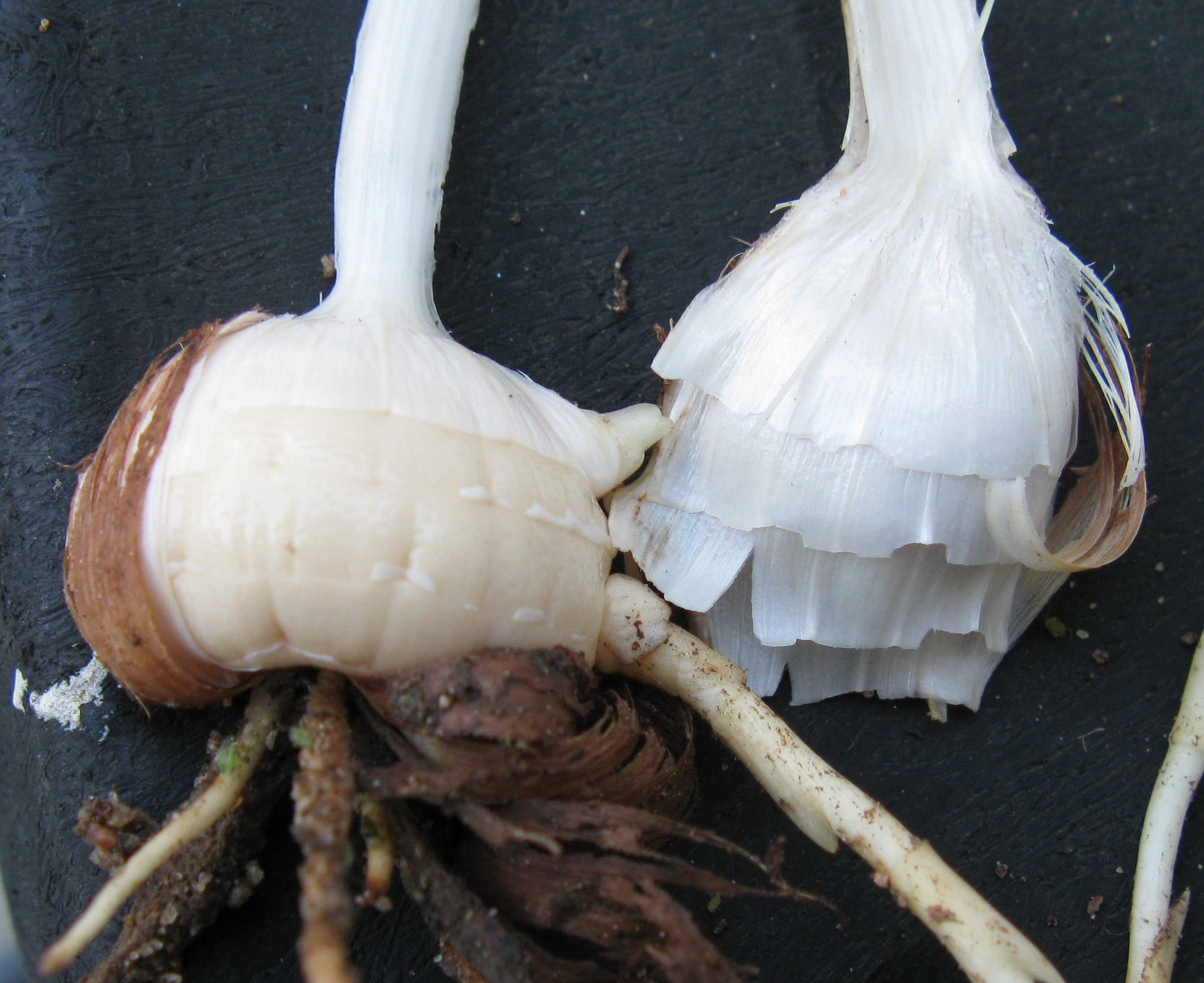
Crocosmia corm with tunic stripped partly off to show its constitution of the basal parts of leaves arising from nodes on the corm. Such leaves, especially early leaves that never performed much photosynthesis, amount to true cataphylls.

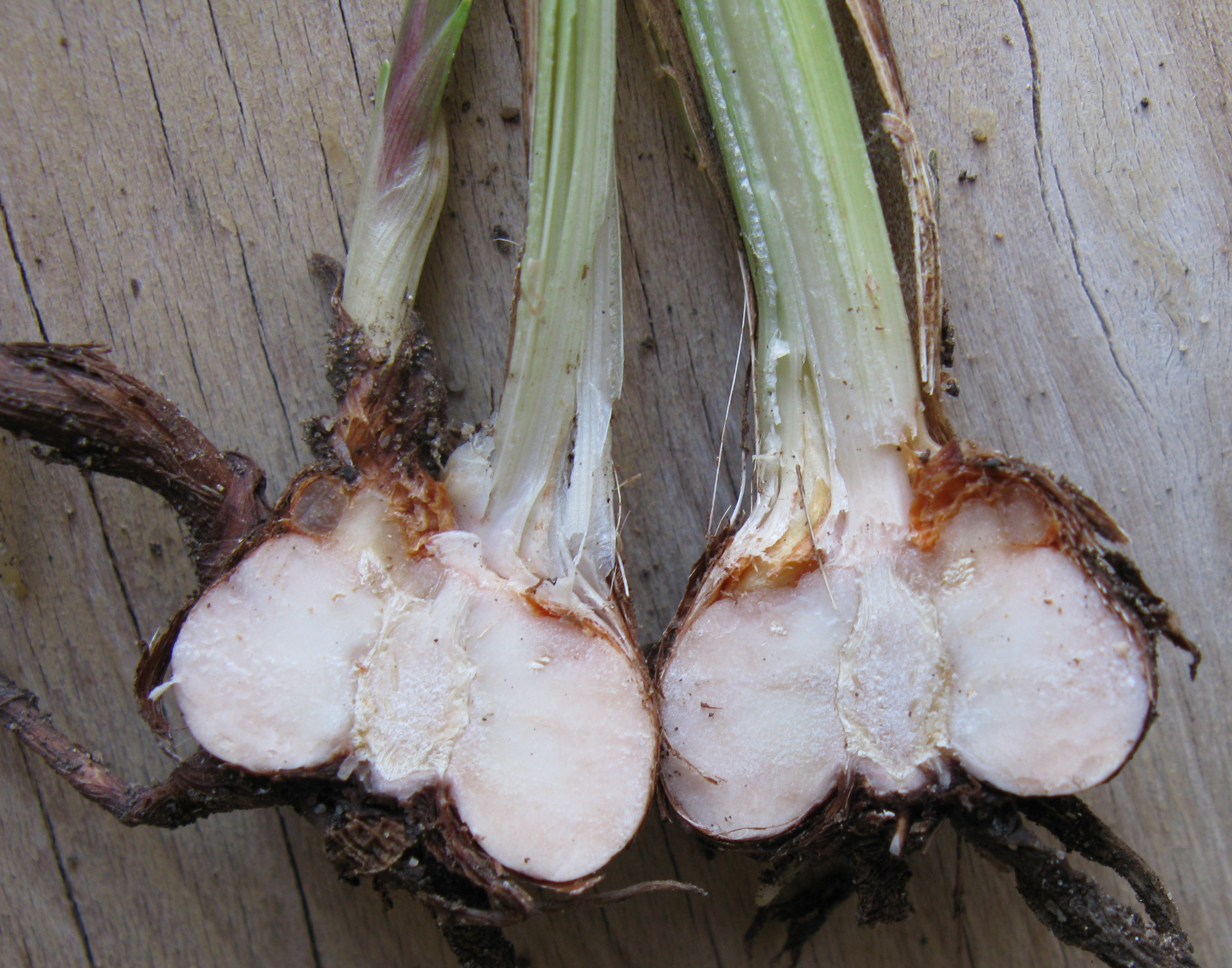
Corm of Crocosmia, split to show tunic and leaves, as well as a new corm growing from a bud on the cortex of the old corm.

== See also ==
- Leaf shape
- Leaf size
