= Zamia magnifica =

Scientific classification
- Kingdom: Plantae
- Clade: Tracheophytes
- Clade: Gymnospermae
- Division: Cycadophyta
- Class: Cycadopsida
- Order: Cycadales
- Family: Zamiaceae
- Genus: Zamia
- Species: Z. magnifica

Binomial name
- Zamia magnifica Peréz-Farr., Gut.Ortega & Calonje

Species of cycad

Zamia magnifica is a species of plant in the family Zamiaceae. It is endemic to Oaxaca, Mexico, found only in the La Chinantla region of Sierra Norte de Oaxaca. It is rare and threatened by habitat loss.

== Etymology ==
The species epithet magnifica is from the Latin magnificus (magnificent), referring to the appearance of the large, pendant leaves of the plant.

== Description ==
Zamia magnifica has a subterranean stem, erect or recumbent, with one or more braching apexes 10 to 38 centimetres (3.9 to 15.0 in) in height and 10 to 17 centimetres (3.9 to 6.7 in) in diameter. Cataphylls (modified leaves that protect the base of the true leaves) are covered with brown hairs. There are three to four pendant compound leaves on the apex of each stem. The leaves are 160.8 to 324 centimetres (63.3 to 127.6 in) long and 38.7 to 60 centimetres (15.2 to 23.6 in) wide. Leaves emerge pink in color and densely covered in hairs, changing through caramel to dark green with sparse hair coverage at maturity. petioles (leaf stems) are 57.3 to 83 centimetres (22.6 to 32.7 in) long with only a few very small prickles. The rachis (leaf shaft) is 93 to 206 centimetres (37 to 81 in) long, with no or very few very small prickles on the lower third. There are 10 to 17 pairs of leaflets on a leaf. The leaflets are up to 47.7 centimetres (18.8 in) long and up to 11.1 centimetres (4.4 in) wide, oblong to oblanceolate with a sharp point. The leaflet edges are toothed on the outer quarter of the leaflet.

Like all cycads, Zamia magnifica is dioecious, with individual plants being either male or female. There are one to three male strobili (cones) on a plant, on peduncles (stalks) that are 3.2 to 5.5 centimetres (1.3 to 2.2 in) tall and 1.2 to 1.5 centimetres (0.47 to 0.59 in) in diameter. The cones are conical, erect, 10.75 to 15 centimetres (4.23 to 5.91 in) long and 0.5 to 2.33 centimetres (0.20 to 0.92 in) in diameter, green at first, becoming tan to light brown to light orange when mature. There is one female strobilus on a plant. They are cylindrical, erect, 9.1 to 15.8 centimetres (3.6 to 6.2 in) tall and 7.2 to 7.8 centimetres (2.8 to 3.1 in) in diameter, and yellowish at maturity. The strobili sit on peduncles that are 9.1 to 10 centimetres (3.6 to 3.9 in) long and 1.4 to 2.7 centimetres (0.55 to 1.06 in) in diameter. The seeds are ovate, 18.6 to 23.5 millimetres (0.73 to 0.93 in) long, and 12.5 to 15.2 millimetres (0.49 to 0.60 in) in diameter. The sarcotesta (seed covering) is reddich-orange at maturity.

== Distribution and habitat ==
Zamia magnifica has only been found in only one location, about 4,477 hectares (11,060 acres) in area, in the La Chinantla region in Oaxaca. The habitat is tropical rainforest on a karst landscape. Z. Magnifica grows only on cliff faces, one of four such Zamia species in Mesoamerica (the others are Zamia cremnophila in Tabasco, Mexico, Zamia sandovalii in Honduras, and Zamia meermanii in Belize). The known population of about 2,000 individual plants is actively protected by the local population. That population is reported to use the seeds of the plant as an insecticide, mixing ground seeds with sugar or honey, with the flies that feed on the bait killed by the toxins in the seeds. The land surrounding the known population is being converted to pasture and coffee and maize production.

== Acceptance ==
Zamia magnifica has been accepted as a valid species by the World List of Cycads, Plants of the World Online, and World Flora Online.

== Sources ==
- Peréz-Farrera, Miguel Angel; Guitérriz-Ortega, José Said; Martínez-Martínez, Mauricio Géronimo; Calonje, Michael (2023). "Zamia magnifica (Zamiaceae, Cycadales): A New Rupicolous Cycad Species from Sierra Norte, Oaxaca, Mexico". Taxonomy. 3 (2): 232–249.
