= Zamia gentryi =

Conservation status
- Endangered (IUCN 3.1)

Scientific classification
- Kingdom: Plantae
- Clade: Tracheophytes
- Clade: Gymnosperms
- Division: Cycadophyta
- Class: Cycadopsida
- Order: Cycadales
- Family: Zamiaceae
- Genus: Zamia
- Species: Z. gentryi

Binomial name
- Zamia gentryi Dodson

Species of cycad

Zamia gentryi is a species of plant in the family Zamiaceae. It is endemic to Ecuador. It is threatened by habitat loss. It is found in two locations in Carchi Province and Esmeraldas Province, Ecuador, which are located near Alto Tambo, as well as between Lita and San Lorenzo.

== Etymology ==
The species epithet gentryi refers to Alwyn H. Gentry, who helped collect the type specimen.

== Description ==
Zamia gentryi may be either terrestrial with a stem lying on top of the ground, or epiphytic. The stem is 1 metre (3 ft 3 in) or more long with a diameter of 12 centimetres (4.7 in) in the wild, and up to 25 centimetres (9.8 in) on plants in cultivation (where they are in full sunlight). There are five to nine compound leaves on the apex of the stem in the wild, and up to 13 leaves on plants under cultivation.

Cataphylls (modified leaves that protect the base of the true leaves) are fleshy, triangular and up 12 centimetres (4.7 in) long. The leaves are erect, or arching away from the vertical, 2.5 metres (8 ft 2 in) long with a 45 to 90 centimetres (18 to 35 in) long petiole (leaf stem). They emerge bright reddish-green and turn pale yellow-green as they mature. The petiole is covered with spines up to 1 centimetre (0.39 in) long. The leaflets are up to 40 centimetres (16 in) long and 3.5 to 6 centimetres (1.4 to 2.4 in) wide, narrowly ovate, with a sharp point at the apex and a smooth margin. The parallel leaf veins are sunken into the surface. The leaves have been described as "plicate" by some authors. Plicate leaves are otherwise found in Zamia only in members of the Zamia skinneri species complex and Z. dressleri in Panama, and in Z. wallisii in Colombia and Z. roezlii in Colombia and Ecuador (where it is found close to Z. gentryi).

Like all cycads, Zamia gentryi is dioecious, with individual plants being either male or female. There are one to seven male strobili (cones) on a plant, erect at the end of a peduncle (stalk) up to 25 centimetres (9.8 in) long which curves to horizontal before returning to vertical to hold the strobilus upright. The cones are flattened-cylindrical, up to 35 centimetres (14 in) long and 3.8 centimetres (1.5 in) in diameter, and wine-red. There is only one female strobilus on a plant. They are barrel-shaped, up to 30 centimetres (12 in) tall and 15 centimetres (5.9 in) in diameter, red-brown in color. The seeds are ob-ovoid (egg-shaped), 3.5 centimetres (1.4 in) long, and 1.7 centimetres (0.67 in) in diameter. The sarcotesta (seed covering) is pink to reddish at maturity.

== Phylogeny ==
A 2024 study of the phylogeny of Zamia based on transcriptomes placed Zamia gentryi in a clade (VI) consisting of species found in South America west of the Andes Mountains, and in southernmost Panama. It appears to be closely related to Z. amplifolia, Z. chigua, Z. lindenii, and Z. roezlii.

== Distribution and habitat ==
Known populations of Zamia gentri are in Carchi and Esmeraldas provinces in northwestern Ecuador, but may be more widespread, including in southwestern Colombia. The species is restricted to "extremely wet" (Note: Recorded rainfall at the nearby town of Alto Tambo is 6,500 millimetres (260 in) per year.) rain forest on foothills from 300 to 1,800 metres (980 to 5,910 ft) elevation. Z. gentryi plants on the forest floor grow in deep shade. The subsoil in the area is almost pure kaolin, with only a very thin layer of topsoil, and the terrestrial plant stems lay on top of the soil with roots penetrating only into the thin topsoil. One population of Z. gentryi near the road from San Lorenzo to Lita grows in proximity to a population of Z. roezlii, but there is no evidence of hybridization between the species.

== Sources ==
- Dodson, Calaway H. (1998). "A New Species of Zamia (Zamiaceae) from Ecuador". Novon. 8 (1): 12–14. Bibcode:1998Novon...8...12D. doi:10.2307/3391883. ISSN 1055-3177. JSTOR 3391883.
- Lindstrom, Anders; Nabib, Sadaf; Dong, Shanshan; Dong, Yiqing; Liu, Jiang; Calonje, Michael; Stevenson, Dennis; Zhang, Shouzhou (2024). "Transcriptome sequencing data provide a solid base to understand phylogenetic relationships, biogeography and reticulated evolution of the genus Zamia L. (Cycadales, Zamiaceae)". Annals of Botany. XX (5): 747–768. doi:10.1093/aob/mcae065. PMC 11560380. PMID 38900840.
- Taylor B., Alberto S.; Haynes, Jody L.; Holzman, Greg (November 2008). "Taxonomical, nomenclatural and biogeographical revelations in the Zamia skinneri complex of Central America (Cycadales: Zamiacea)". Botanical Journal of the Linnean Society. 158 (3): 399–429. doi:10.1111/j.1095-8339.2008.00886.x.
