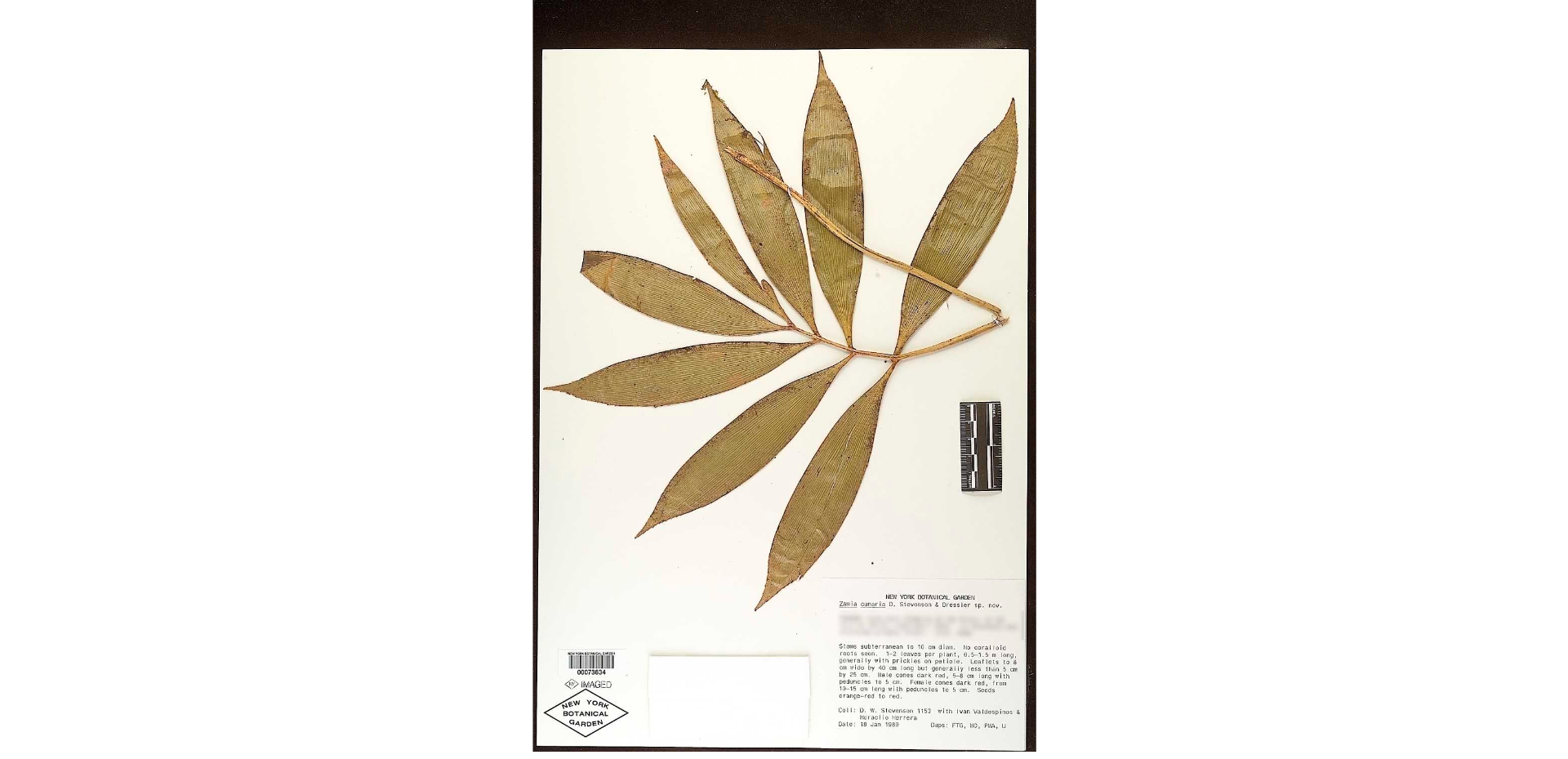

Conservation status
- Endangered (IUCN 3.1)

Scientific classification
- Kingdom: Plantae
- Clade: Embryophytes
- Clade: Tracheophytes
- Clade: Gymnosperms
- Division: Cycadophyta
- Class: Cycadopsida
- Order: Cycadales
- Family: Zamiaceae
- Genus: Zamia
- Species: Z. cunaria

Binomial name
- Zamia cunaria Dressler & D.W.Stev.

= Zamia cunaria =

Species of cycad

Zamia cunaria (also obset) is a species of plant in the family Zamiaceae. It is endemic to the area of Comarca Guna Yala, Panama.

== Etymology ==
The epithet cunaria refers to the Guna people (formerly spelled "Kuna" or "Cuna"), who make necklaces from the seeds of the plant, and in whose territory the species is endemic. The Guna call the plant obset.

== Description ==
Zamia cunaria was described in 1993 by Dennis Stevenson based on a type found in 1989 in Guna Yala, Panama.

The stem of Zamia cunaria is subterranean, sub-globose, and up to 10 centimetres (3.9 in) in diameter. There is usually one, but sometimes up to three, compound leaves on the stem apex. The leaves are 0.5 to 1.5 metres (1 ft 8 in to 4 ft 11 in) long, with a 15 to 50 centimetres (5.9 to 19.7 in) long petiole (leaf stalk). The petiole is sparsely to densely covered by prickles. There are three to twelve pairs of leaflets on the rachis (shaft) of the leaf. The leaflets are lanceolate or oblanceolate, wedge-shaped at the base and tapering to a point. The edges are toothed on the outer third of the leaflets. Larger leaflets are 20 to 40 centimetres (7.9 to 15.7 in) long and 5 to 8 centimetres (2.0 to 3.1 in) wide.

Like all cycads, Zamia cunaria is dioecious, with individual plants being either male or female. Male strobili (cones) are cream to tan in color, cylindrical to ovoid-cylindrical in shape, 4 to 6 centimetres (1.6 to 2.4 in) long and 1 to 1.5 centimetres (0.39 to 0.59 in) in diameter, standing on a peduncle 2 to 4 centimetres (0.79 to 1.57 in) tall. Female strobili are wine-red to dark red-brown in color, ovoid to ovoid-cylindrical in shape, 15 to 20 centimetres (5.9 to 7.9 in) long and 5 to 7 centimetres (2.0 to 2.8 in) in diameter. Seeds are pink to light-red, 1.5 to 2 centimetres (0.59 to 0.79 in) long and 0.5 to 0.8 centimetres (0.20 to 0.31 in) in diameter.

== Distribution and habitat ==
Zamia cunaria usually is found on clay soils in secondary vegetation in hilly country between 400 and 800 metres (1,300 and 2,600 ft) above sea level.

== Karyology ==
Zamia cunaria plants have chromosome numbers of either 2n=23 or 2n=24. Similar to other Zamia species with high chromosome numbers, the chromosomes in Z. cunaria appear to be more fragile than those of species with a chromosome number of 2n=18. Caputo et al. suggest that odd chromosome numbers may result from Robertsonian translocation, from chromosome fusion or fission, or from crossover breeding between plants of the same species with different chromosome numbers.

== Phylogeny ==
Caputo et al. placed Zamia cunaria in the Manicata clade in 1996, along with Z. manicata, Z. obliqua, and Z. iepetiensis. Later molecular phylogenic studies, however, have defined a Manicata clade which does not include Z. cunaria, Z. obliqua, or Z. iepetensis. Calonje et al. placed Z. cunaria, Z. iepetiensis, both endemic to Panama, and Z. pyrophylla, in South America, in a "Cunaria clade" that is part of the South American clade rather than the Isthmus clade. Lindstrom et al. placed Z. cunaria, Z. iepetiensis, Z. pyrophylla, and Z. paucifoliolata, also in South America, in a clade that is part of the West of the Andes clade.

== Sources ==
- Calonje, Michael; Meerow, Alan W.; Griffith, M. Patrick; Salas-Leiva, Dayana; Vovides, Andrew P.; Coiro, Mario; Francisco-Ortega, Javier (May 2019). "A Time-Calibrated Species Tree Phylogeny of the New World Cycad Genus Zamia L. (Zamiaceae, Cycadales)". International Journal of Plant Sciences. 180 (4): 286–314. Bibcode:2019IJPlS.180..286C. doi:10.1086/702642. ISSN 1058-5893.
- Caputo, Paolo; Cozzolino, Salvatore; Gaudio, Lucinao; Moretti, Aldo; Stevenson, Dennis W. (1996). "Karyology and Phylogeny of Some Mesoamerican Species of Zamia (Zamiaceae)". American Journal of Botany. 83 (11): 1513–1520. doi:10.2307/2446105. ISSN 0002-9122. JSTOR 2446105.
- Lindstrom, Anders; Nabib, Sadaf; Dong, Shanshan; Dong, Yiqing; Liu, Jiang; Calonje, Michael; Stevenson, Dennis; Zhang, Shouzhou (2024). "Transcriptome sequencing data provide a solid base to understand phylogenetic relationships, biogeography and reticulated evolution of the genus Zamia L. (Cycadales, Zamiaceae)". Annals of Botany. XX (5): 747–768. doi:10.1093/aob/mcae065. PMC 11560380. PMID 38900840.
- Stevenson, Dennis Wm. (January 1993). "The Zamiaceae in Panama with Comments on Phytogeography and Species Relationships". Brittonia. 45 (1): 1–16. Bibcode:1993Britt..45....1S. doi:10.2307/2806850. JSTOR 2806850.
