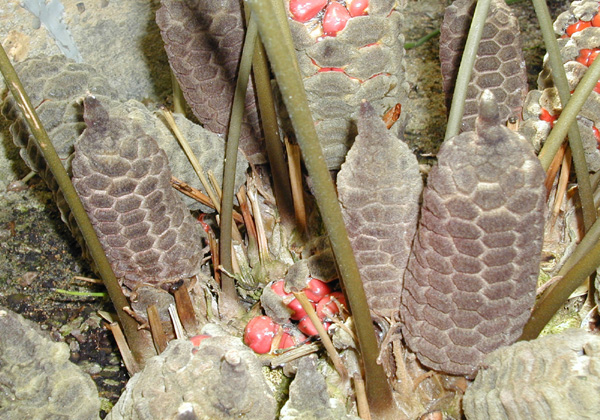

Conservation status
- Vulnerable (IUCN 3.1)

Scientific classification
- Kingdom: Plantae
- Clade: Embryophytes
- Clade: Tracheophytes
- Clade: Spermatophytes
- Clade: Gymnospermae
- Division: Cycadophyta
- Class: Cycadopsida
- Order: Cycadales
- Family: Zamiaceae
- Genus: Zamia
- Species: Z. pumila

Binomial name
- Zamia pumila L.

= Zamia pumila =

Species of cycad

Zamia pumila, commonly known as guáyiga or guáyara in Spanish, is a small, tough, woody cycad native to the Greater Antilles. Z. pumila was the first species described for the genus and, therefore, is the type species for the genus Zamia, the Zamia pumila species complex, and the family Zamiaceae.

== Description ==
This cycad contains reddish seed cones with a distinct acuminate tip. The leaves are 60–120 cm (2.0–3.9 ft) long, with 5-30 pairs of leaflets (pinnae). Each leaflet is linear to lanceolate or oblong-obovate, 8–25 cm long and 0.5–2 cm broad, with distinct teeth at the tip. They are often revolute, with prickly petioles. It is similar in many respects to Z. furfuracea, but with slightly narrower leaflets, and to Z. integrifolia (with which it sometimes grouped), which differs in the more commonly entire (untoothed or only slightly so) leaflets.

This is a low-growing plant, with trunk that grows to 3–25 cm high and diameter, but is often subterranean. Over time, it forms a multi-branched cluster, with a large, tuberous root system, which is actually an extension of the above-ground stems.

Like other cycads, Z. pumila is dioecious, having male or female plants. The male cones are cylindrical, growing to 3–15 cm long; they are often clustered. The female cones are elongate-ovoid and grow to 6–15 cm long and 4–6 cm in diameter. Pollination is done by certain insects, namely the cycad weevil Rhopalotria slossoni.

== Habitat and distribution ==
Z. pumila inhabits a variety of habitats with well-drained sands or sandy loam soils. It prefers filtered sunlight to partial shade. It is currently known to exist on central Cuba, southern Puerto Rico, and the Dominican Republic on Hispaniola; populations formerly also occurred in Haiti, but have possibly become extirpated there due to intensive land use. Populations in Puerto Rico have declined due to clearing for cattle ranching.

== Ecology ==
This plant is poisonous, producing a toxin called cycasin that affects the gastrointestinal tract and nervous system. The toxin can however be removed by careful leaching, and the roots and half-buried stems were used by the Taíno people for their yield of a starch. The plant is also fed upon by various insects, including the Atala butterfly (Eumaeus atala), which sequesters the toxin inside its body for use in its own defense.
