= Zamia imbricata =

Scientific classification
- Kingdom: Plantae
- Clade: Tracheophytes
- Clade: Gymnosperms
- Division: Cycadophyta
- Class: Cycadopsida
- Order: Cycadales
- Family: Zamiaceae
- Genus: Zamia
- Species: Z. imbricata

Binomial name
- Zamia imbricata Calonje & J.Castro

Species of cycad

Zamia imbricata is a species of plant in the family Zamiaceae described in 2021. The stem is subterranean, the leaves have overlapping leaflets, and the reproductive cones are held on very long stalks. Its natural habitat is tropical rainforest in Colombia. It is very rare, and the known population does not appear to be successfully reproducing.

== Classification ==
Z. imbricata was described and named in 2021 by Michael Calonje and Jonatan Castro Hernandéz, based on the holotype found in 2020 in La Dorada, Caldas, Colombia. Additional specimens (paratypes) also found in Caldas Department were considered in the description. The specific name imbricata is from the Latin imbricatus ("covered with tiles"), referring to the overlapping leaflets. Z. imbricata is a member of the Manicata clade.

== Description ==
The stem of Z. imbricata is subterranean, 10 to 30 centimetres (3.9 to 11.8 in) long and 1 to 15 centimetres (0.39 to 5.91 in) in diameter. There are one to five leaves at the apex of the stem. The leaves are 13 to 200 centimetres (5.1 to 78.7 in) long and 10 to 19 centimetres (3.9 to 7.5 in) wide, emerging covered with white to tan hairs which are lost as the leaves mature. Leaf stalks are 14 to 141 centimetres (5.5 to 55.5 in) long, ochre to olive-green in color, rarely with a few small prickles. The axes of the leaves are 20 to 73 centimetres (7.9 to 28.7 in) long, also ochre to olive-green in color. There are 6 to 110 leaflets per leaf, overlapping to form a flat leaf surface. Leaflets are lanceolate, dark green, and dull to semi-glossy, with toothed edges. Leaflets in the middle of the leaf are 4.9 to 11.6 centimetres (1.9 to 4.6 in) long and 1.5 to 1.8 centimetres (0.59 to 0.71 in) wide.

As with all Zamia, Z. imbricata is dioecious, with individual plants being either male or female. Pollen (male) strobili (cones) are light reddish-brown, conical-cylindrical, 2.8 to 3.0 centimetres (1.1 to 1.2 in) long, and 0.7 to 0.8 centimetres (0.28 to 0.31 in) in diameter. One or two male strobili appear at one time on a plant, on olive-brown peduncles (stalks) that are 20 to 25 centimetres (7.9 to 9.8 in) long and 0.3 to 0.35 centimetres (0.12 to 0.14 in) in diameter. Ovulate (female) strobili are reddish-brown to brown, cylindrical, 5.2 to 8.8 centimetres (2.0 to 3.5 in) long, and 2.8 to 4 centimetres (1.1 to 1.6 in) in diameter. Only one female strobilus appears on a plant at a time, on an olive-green peduncle, covered with white hair, that is 25 to 31.5 centimetres (9.8 to 12.4 in) long by 0.6 to 0.75 centimetres (0.24 to 0.30 in) in diameter. Seeds are ovoid, 13.0 to 13.6 millimetres (0.51 to 0.54 in) long and 9.2 to 9.6 millimetres (0.36 to 0.38 in) thick, and have an orange-red sarcotesta.

== Habitat ==
Z. imbricata is found in tropical rainforest of the Magdalena–Urabá moist forests ecoregion in northern Colombia, on steep slopes between 200–245 metres (656–804 ft) elevation. It grows in well-drained sandy, acidic soils. Zamia incognita also occurs in the same area, but there is no evidence of hybridization between the two species. As of 2020, only 15 plants of Z. imbricata had been found. Fertilization appears to be infrequent, and seed production very low. No seedlings of Z. imbricata were observed in the study area. The describing authorities have recommended that it be classified as Critically Endangered, but the IUCN has not yet evaluated it.

== Sources ==
- Calonje, Michael; Castro Hernández, Jonatan; Coca, Luis Fernando; Jaramillo, Daniel; Aristizábal, Arturo (16 April 2021). "Two new species of Zamia (Zamiaceae, Cycadales) from the Magdalena-Urabá moist forests ecoregion of northern Colombia". Phytotaxa. 497 (1): 1–19. doi:10.11646/phytotaxa.497.1.1. ISSN 1179-3163.
