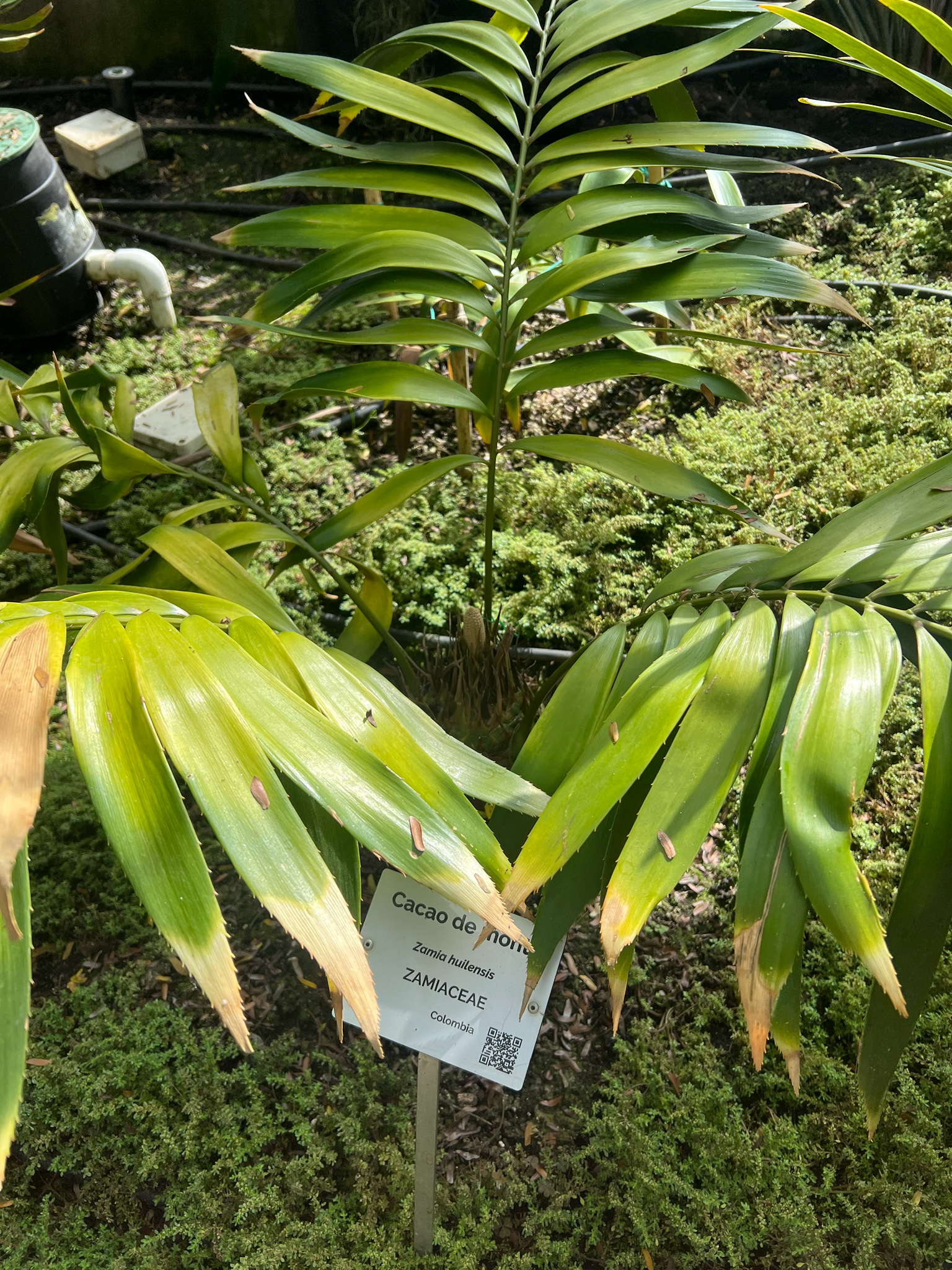

Conservation status
- Endangered (IUCN 3.1)

Scientific classification
- Kingdom: Plantae
- Clade: Embryophytes
- Clade: Tracheophytes
- Clade: Spermatophytes
- Clade: Gymnospermae
- Division: Cycadophyta
- Class: Cycadopsida
- Order: Cycadales
- Family: Zamiaceae
- Genus: Zamia
- Species: Z. huilensis

Binomial name
- Zamia huilensis Calonje, H.E.Esquivel & D.W.Stev.

= Zamia huilensis =

Species of cycad

Zamia huilensis is a species of cycad in the family Zamiaceae. Its common name is palma de monte.
