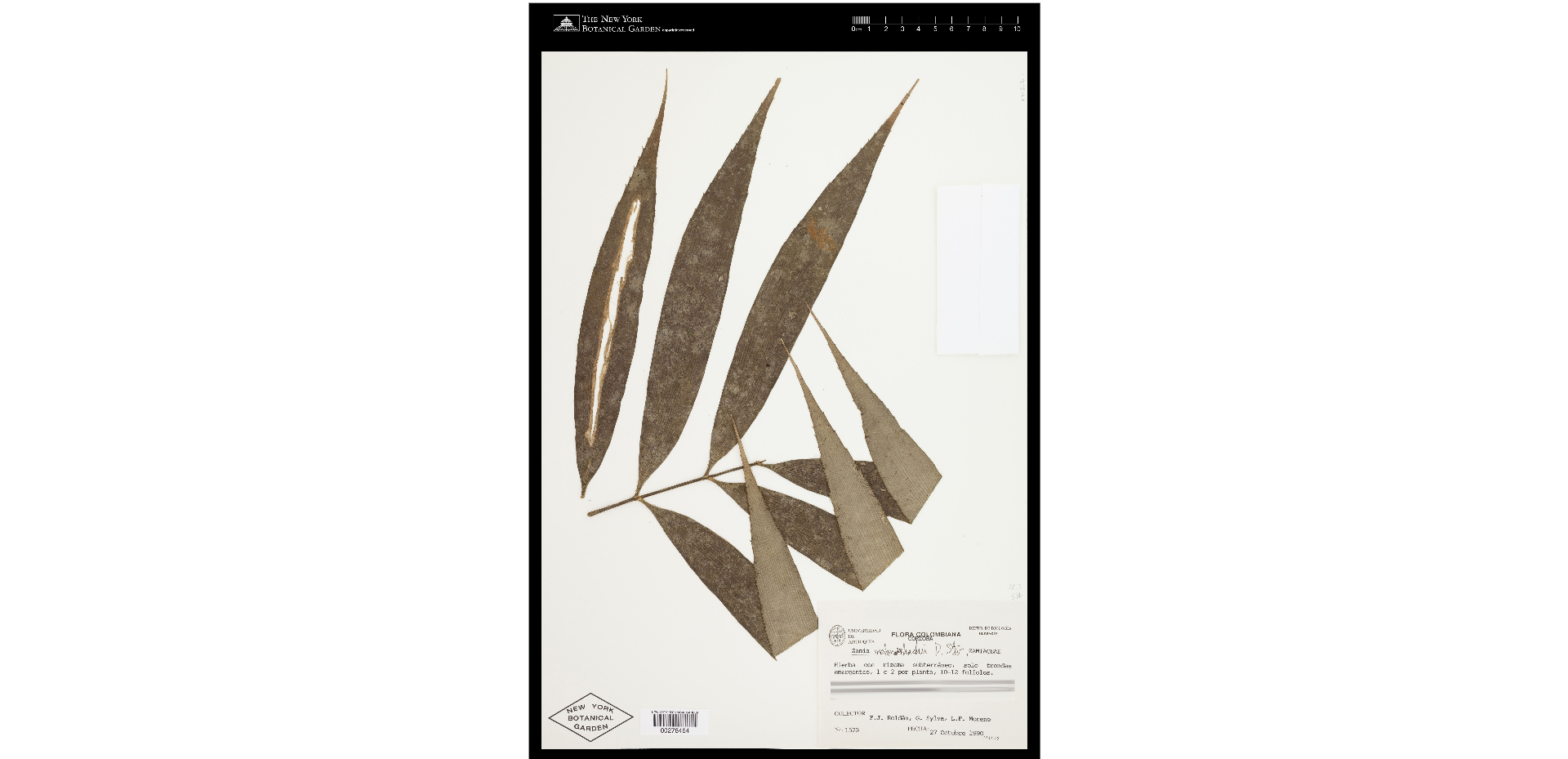

Conservation status
- Endangered (IUCN 3.1)

Scientific classification
- Kingdom: Plantae
- Clade: Embryophytes
- Clade: Tracheophytes
- Clade: Spermatophytes
- Clade: Gymnospermae
- Division: Cycadophyta
- Class: Cycadopsida
- Order: Cycadales
- Family: Zamiaceae
- Genus: Zamia
- Species: Z. melanorrhachis

Binomial name
- Zamia melanorrhachis D.W.Stev.

= Zamia melanorrhachis =

Species of plant

Zamia melanorrhachis is a species of plant in the family Zamiaceae. It has been found in Amazonas, Córdoba, Meta, and Santander departments in Colombia. It grows in forests between sea level and 300 metres (980 ft) altitude. It is commonly known as corocito.

== Description ==
The stem is subterranean, 5 to 8 centimetres (2.0 to 3.1 in) in diameter. Each plant has two to five upright oblong compound-leaves 50 centimetres (20 in) long, on a dark purple to black petiole (stalk) up to 25 centimetres (9.8 in) long. The stalk is covered with very small prickles, extending into the lower half of the dark brown to dark purple rachis (leaf axis). The four to ten pairs of leaflets on a leaf are lanceolate, pointed on the ends, and toothed on the edges of the outer two-thirds of each leaflet. Leaflets are 12 to 15 centimetres (4.7 to 5.9 in) long and 1 to 2 centimetres (0.39 to 0.79 in) wide in the middle of the leaf.

Like all Zamias, Z. melanorrachis is dioecious, with each plant being either male or female. Male strobili (cones) are ovoid, 1 to 3 centimetres (0.39 to 1.18 in) long and 0.5 to 1 centimetre (0.20 to 0.39 in) in diameter, cream to tan in color, and stand on 30 to 50 centimetres (12 to 20 in) long peduncles (stalks). Female cones are cylindrical to ovoid-cylindrical, 5 to 8 centimetres (2.0 to 3.1 in) long and 3 to 4 centimetres (1.2 to 1.6 in) in diameter, and wine-red to dark red-brown in colored. Seeds are 1 to 1.5 centimetres (0.39 to 0.59 in) long and 0.5 to 0.8 centimetres (0.20 to 0.31 in) in diameter.

The specific name melanorrhachis refers to the color of the leaf axis (rachis).

Zamia melanorrhachis is a member of the Manicata clade, a strongly monophylitic group of several species found in northern Colombia.

== Sources ==
- Calonje, Michael; Castro Hernández, Jonatan; Coca, Luis Fernando; Jaramillo, Daniel; Aristizábal, Arturo (16 April 2021). "Two new species of Zamia (Zamiaceae, Cycadales) from the Magdalena-Urabá moist forests ecoregion of northern Colombia". Phytotaxa. 497 (1): 1–19. doi:10.11646/phytotaxa.497.1.1. ISSN 1179-3163.
- Stevenson, Dennis Wm. (2004-04-01). "Cycads of Colombia". The Botanical Review. 70 (2): 194–234. doi:10.1663/0006-8101(2004)070[0194:COC]2.0.CO;2. ISSN 1874-9372.
