= Zamia sinuensis =

Scientific classification
- Kingdom: Plantae
- Clade: Tracheophytes
- Clade: Gymnosperms
- Division: Cycadophyta
- Class: Cycadopsida
- Order: Cycadales
- Family: Zamiaceae
- Genus: Zamia
- Species: Z. sinuensis

Binomial name
- Zamia sinuensis Calonje & J.Castro

Species of cycad

Zamia sinuensis is a species of plant in the family Zamiaceae described in 2021. The stem is subterranean or partly subterranean, with dark green compound leaves up to 3 metres (9.8 ft) long. and reproductive cones on long stalks. Its natural habitat is tropical monsoon forest in Colombia. Only five plants have been observed.

== Classification ==
Z. sinuensis was described and named in 2021 by Michael Calonje and Jonatan Castro Hernandéz, based on the holotype found in 2017 in the Paramillo Natural National Park in Tierralta, Córdoba Department. Colombia. Additional specimens (paratypes) also found in the park were considered in the description. The specific name sinuensis was chosen because the species is found in the basin of the Sinú River. Z. sinuensis is a member of the Manicata clade.

== Description ==
The stem of Z. sinuensis is subterranean or partly subterranean, with one to three apices. The stem is cylindrical and 10 to 30 centimetres (3.9 to 11.8 in) long and 5 to 20 centimetres (2.0 to 7.9 in) in diameter. There are three to six dark green leaves on each apex of the stem. The leaves are 1.8 to 3.1 metres (5 ft 11 in to 10 ft 2 in) long and 24.1 to 52.4 centimetres (9.5 to 20.6 in) wide. Leaf stalks are 20 to 175 centimetres (7.9 to 68.9 in) long and 0.7 to 1 centimetre (0.28 to 0.39 in) thick, covered with prickles that are 0.4 to 3.6 millimetres (0.016 to 0.142 in) long. The axes of the leaves are 20 to 135 centimetres (7.9 to 53.1 in) long, with prickles along the proximal section. There are 11 to 54 leaflets per leaf. Leaflets are lanceolate, dark green, and lustrous, with toothed edges. Leaflets in the middle of the leaf are 24.5 to 26.2 centimetres (9.6 to 10.3 in) long and 4.2 to 4.5 centimetres (1.7 to 1.8 in) wide.

As with all Zamia, Z. sinuensis is dioecious, with individual plants being either male or female. Pollen (male) strobili (cones) are conical-cylindrical, 4.9 to 5.1 centimetres (1.9 to 2.0 in) long, and 0.7 to 0.8 centimetres (0.28 to 0.31 in) in diameter. One to five male strobili appear at one time on a plant, on peduncles (stalks) that are 23 to 24 centimetres (9.1 to 9.4 in) tall and 0.38 to 0.40 centimetres (0.15 to 0.16 in) in diameter. Ovulate (female) strobili are reddish-brown, cylindrical, 27.5 centimetres (10.8 in) long, and 5 centimetres (2.0 in) in diameter. Only one female strobilus appears on a plant at a time, on a dark olive-green peduncle 40 centimetres (16 in) tall by 1.5 to 2.1 centimetres (0.59 to 0.83 in) in diameter. Seeds are ovoid to ovoid-pyramidal, 13 to 14 millimetres (0.51 to 0.55 in) long and 7.5 to 8.5 millimetres (0.30 to 0.33 in) thick.

== Habitat ==
Z. sinuensis is found in tropical monsoon forest in northern Colombia, between 180 and 187 metres (591 and 614 ft) in elevation. Only five plants were found in the type locality.

== Sources ==
- Calonje, Michael; Castro Hernández, Jonatan; Coca, Luis Fernando; Jaramillo, Daniel; Aristizábal, Arturo (16 April 2021). "Two new species of Zamia (Zamiaceae, Cycadales) from the Magdalena-Urabá moist forests ecoregion of northern Colombia". Phytotaxa. 497 (1): 1–19. doi:10.11646/phytotaxa.497.1.1. ISSN 1179-3163.
