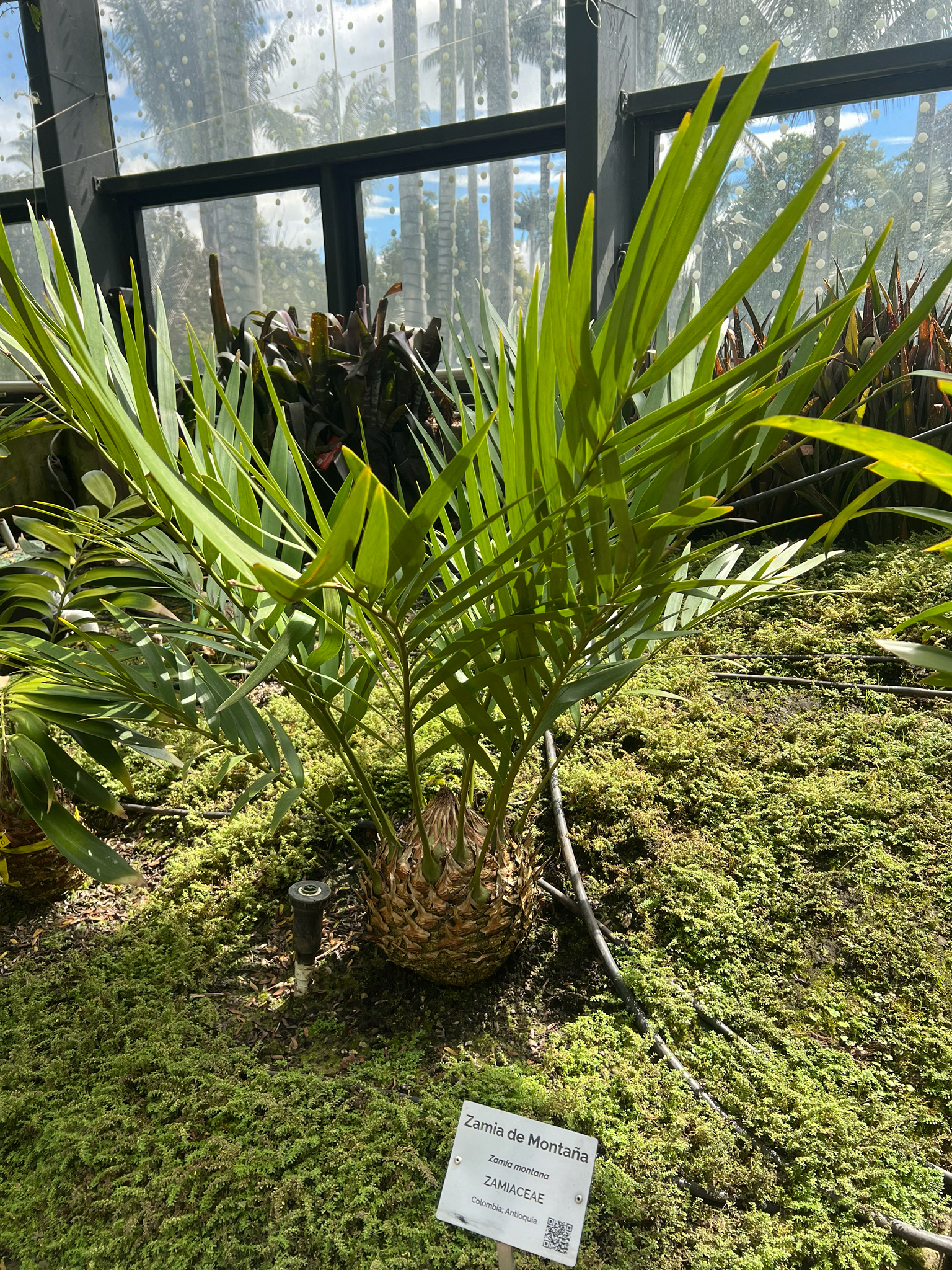

Conservation status
- Critically Endangered (IUCN 3.1)

Scientific classification
- Kingdom: Plantae
- Clade: Embryophytes
- Clade: Tracheophytes
- Clade: Gymnosperms
- Division: Cycadophyta
- Class: Cycadopsida
- Order: Cycadales
- Family: Zamiaceae
- Genus: Zamia
- Species: Z. montana

Binomial name
- Zamia montana A.Braun

Synonyms
- Aulacophyllum montanum (A.Braun) Regel; Zamia kalbreyeri Dammer ex J.Schust.

= Zamia montana =

Species of plant

Zamia montana is a species of plant in the family Zamiaceae. It is endemic to Antioquia Department, Colombia. Its natural habitat is subtropical or tropical moist montane forests. Zamia montana is extremely rare. Its habitat is also extremely threatened by logging activities. In fact, it may well be extinct in the wild because the only known population occurs in an area that was recently logged.
