= Zamia tolimensis =

Scientific classification
- Kingdom: Plantae
- Clade: Tracheophytes
- Clade: Gymnospermae
- Division: Cycadophyta
- Class: Cycadopsida
- Order: Cycadales
- Family: Zamiaceae
- Genus: Zamia
- Species: Z. tolimensis

Binomial name
- Zamia tolimensis Calonje, H.E.Esquivel & D.W.Stev.

Species of cycad

Zamia tolimensis is a species of cycad in the family Zamiaceae.
