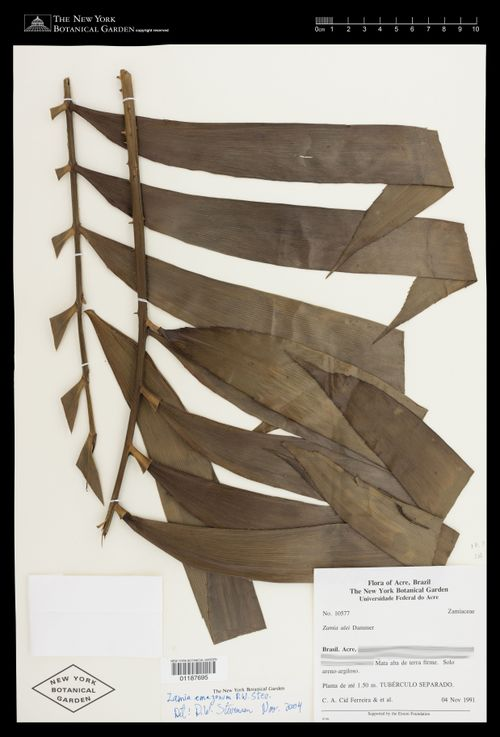

Conservation status
- Least Concern (IUCN 3.1)

Scientific classification
- Kingdom: Plantae
- Clade: Tracheophytes
- Clade: Gymnospermae
- Division: Cycadophyta
- Class: Cycadopsida
- Order: Cycadales
- Family: Zamiaceae
- Genus: Zamia
- Species: Z. amazonum

Binomial name
- Zamia amazonum D.W.Stev.

= Zamia amazonum =

Species of cycad

Zamia amazonum is a species of plant in the family Zamiaceae. It is found in Brazil, Colombia, Peru, and Venezuela.

== Description ==
Zamia amazonum has a subterranean stem 3 to 8 centimetres (1.2 to 3.1 in) in diameter. There are two to six leaves on a plant. The leaves are 0.5 to 2.5 metres (1 ft 8 in to 8 ft 2 in) long on a 0.5 to 1 metre (1 ft 8 in to 3 ft 3 in) long petiole (stalk). The reddish-brown stalk is covered with prickles, which extend into the lower third of the leaf axis. There are 10 to 30 leaflets, which are oblong-lanceolate to lanceolate, pointed at the ends and toothed along the edges of the outer half of the leaflet. Leaflets in the middle of the leaf are 15 to 20 centimetres (5.9 to 7.9 in) long and 2 to 4 centimetres (0.79 to 1.57 in) wide.

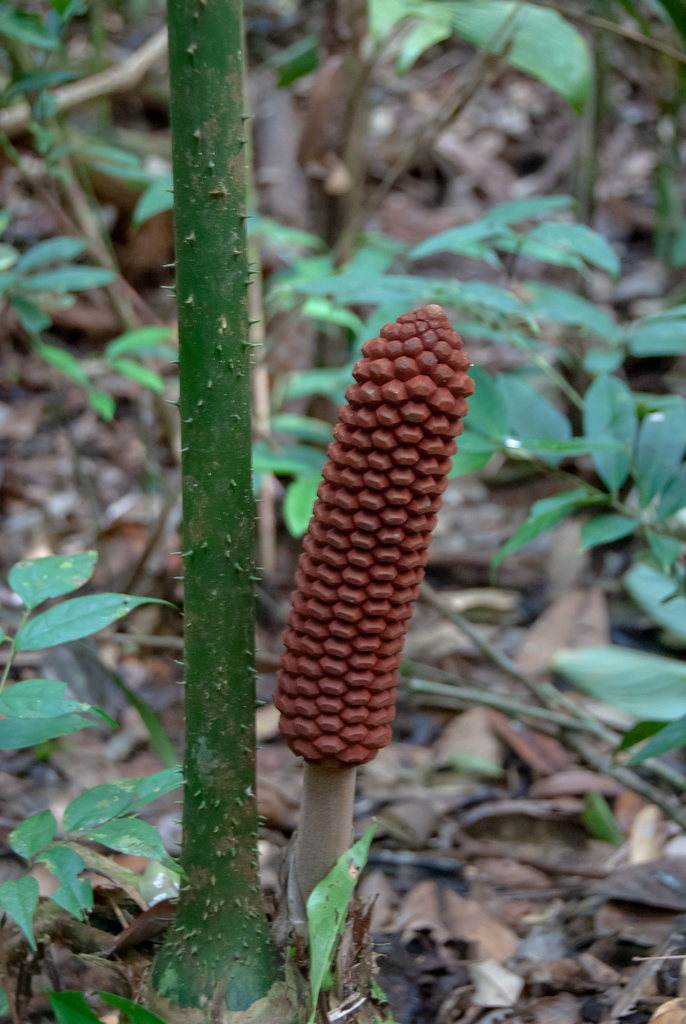
Male strobilus

Like all Zamias, Z. amazonum is dioecious, with each plant being either male or female. Male strobili (cones) are cylindrical, 6 to 10 centimetres (2.4 to 3.9 in) long and 1 to 2 centimetres (0.39 to 0.79 in) in diameter, brown in color, and stand on 8 to 15 centimetres (3.1 to 5.9 in) long peduncles (stalks). Female cones are 10 to 15 centimetres (3.9 to 5.9 in) long and 3 to 5 centimetres (1.2 to 2.0 in) in diameter, dark red-brown in colored, and stand on 5 to 8 centimetres (2.0 to 3.1 in) long stalks. Seeds are ovoid, 1 centimetre (0.39 in) long and 0.5 centimetres (0.20 in) in diameter, with a red sarcotesta (outer fleshy coat).

== Habitat ==
Zamia amazonum is locally abundant in the upper Amazon basin in Brazil, Colombia, Peru, and Venezuela, and in Chocó Department on the Pacific coast of Colombia. The species name refers to its wide-spread occurrence in the Amazon basin.

== Human use ==
Crushed Z. amazonum root that has been soaked in water overnight is reported to be used as a treatment for leishmaniasis by the Chayahuita people of northeastern Peru.

== Sources ==
- Stevenson, Dennis Wm. (April 2004). "Cycads of Colombia". The Botanical Review. 70 (2): 194–234. doi:10.1663/0006-8101(2004)070[0194:COC]2.0.CO;2. ISSN 1874-9372.
