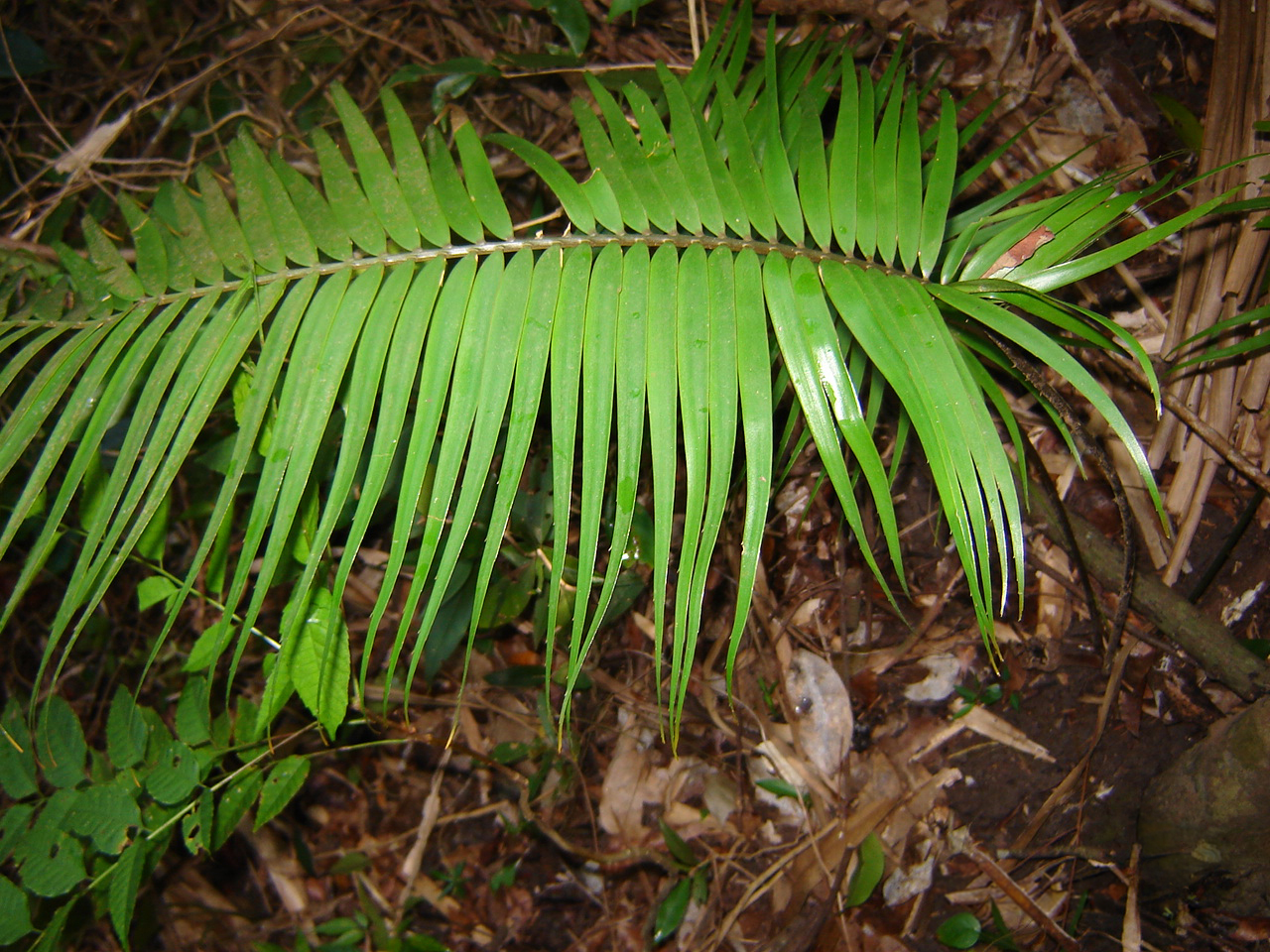

Scientific classification
- Kingdom: Plantae
- Clade: Tracheophytes
- Clade: Gymnospermae
- Division: Cycadophyta
- Class: Cycadopsida
- Order: Cycadales
- Family: Zamiaceae
- Genus: Zamia
- Species: Z. oreillyi

Binomial name
- Zamia oreillyi C.Nelson

= Zamia oreillyi =

Species of cycad

Zamia oreillyi is a species of cycad in the family Zamiaceae endemic to Honduras. It occurs in a single location in Atlántida Department, Honduras near Hacienda Agua Caliente, which is about 2 km southwest of Jutiapa.

== Sources ==
- Nicolalde-Morejón, Fernando; Vovides, Andrew P.; Stevenson, Dennis W. (9 December 2009). "Taxonomic revision of Zamia in Mega-Mexico". Brittonia. 61 (4): 301–335. doi:10.1007/s12228-009-9077-9. ISSN 0007-196X.
