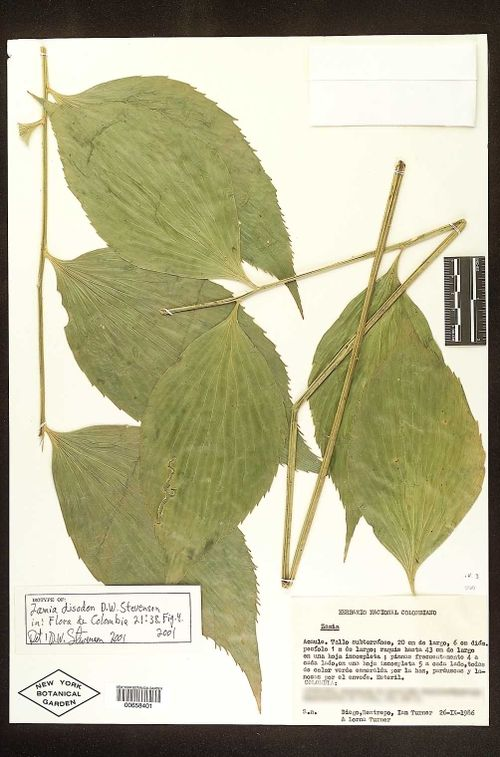

Conservation status
- Endangered (IUCN 3.1)

Scientific classification
- Kingdom: Plantae
- Clade: Embryophytes
- Clade: Tracheophytes
- Clade: Spermatophytes
- Clade: Gymnospermae
- Division: Cycadophyta
- Class: Cycadopsida
- Order: Cycadales
- Family: Zamiaceae
- Genus: Zamia
- Species: Z. disodon

Binomial name
- Zamia disodon D.W.Stev. & Sabato

= Zamia disodon =

Species of plant

Zamia disodon is a species of plant in the family Zamiaceae. It is a subshrub endemic to Colombia.

== Description ==
Zamia disodon grows as a small shrub, with a stem up to 50 centimetres (20 in) tall and 5 to 8 centimetres (2.0 to 3.1 in) in diameter. There are two to four compound leaves at the apex of the stem. The leaves are 50 centimetres (20 in) long on a petiole (stalk) up to 25 centimetres (9.8 in) long. The stalk is sparsely covered with prickles. The axis is 25 centimetres (9.8 in) long, and there are three to five pairs of leaflets per leaf, which are transparent, elliptic, and toothed along the edges of the leaflet, with double teeth near the tips. Leaflets in the middle of the leaf are 12 to 20 centimetres (4.7 to 7.9 in) long and 6 to 10 centimetres (2.4 to 3.9 in) wide. strobili (reproductive cones) have not been observed.

== Habitat ==
Zamia disodon is known to grow in two locations in Antioquia Department in Colombia and in one location in Huánuco Province in Peru. Reported collections of plants have been infrequent, and the species is believed to be rare, but it has been reported that the plant is sold in local markets. The habitat is severely threatened.

== Sources ==
- Stevenson, Dennis Wm. (April 2004). "Cycads of Colombia". The Botanical Review. 70 (2): 194–234. doi:10.1663/0006-8101(2004)070[0194:COC]2.0.CO;2. ISSN 1874-9372.
