= Zamia macrochiera =

Conservation status
- Critically Endangered (IUCN 3.1)

Scientific classification
- Kingdom: Plantae
- Clade: Tracheophytes
- Clade: Gymnospermae
- Division: Cycadophyta
- Class: Cycadopsida
- Order: Cycadales
- Family: Zamiaceae
- Genus: Zamia
- Species: Z. macrochiera

Binomial name
- Zamia macrochiera D.W.Stev. & Sabato

Species of plant

Zamia macrochiera is a species of plant in the family Zamiaceae. It is endemic to Peru. It is found near the towns of Pebas and Pucaurquillo in Maynas Province, Loreto Region; plants are found near the Rio Amiyacu and Rio Napo. It is threatened by habitat loss, and is considered critically endangered by the IUCN.
