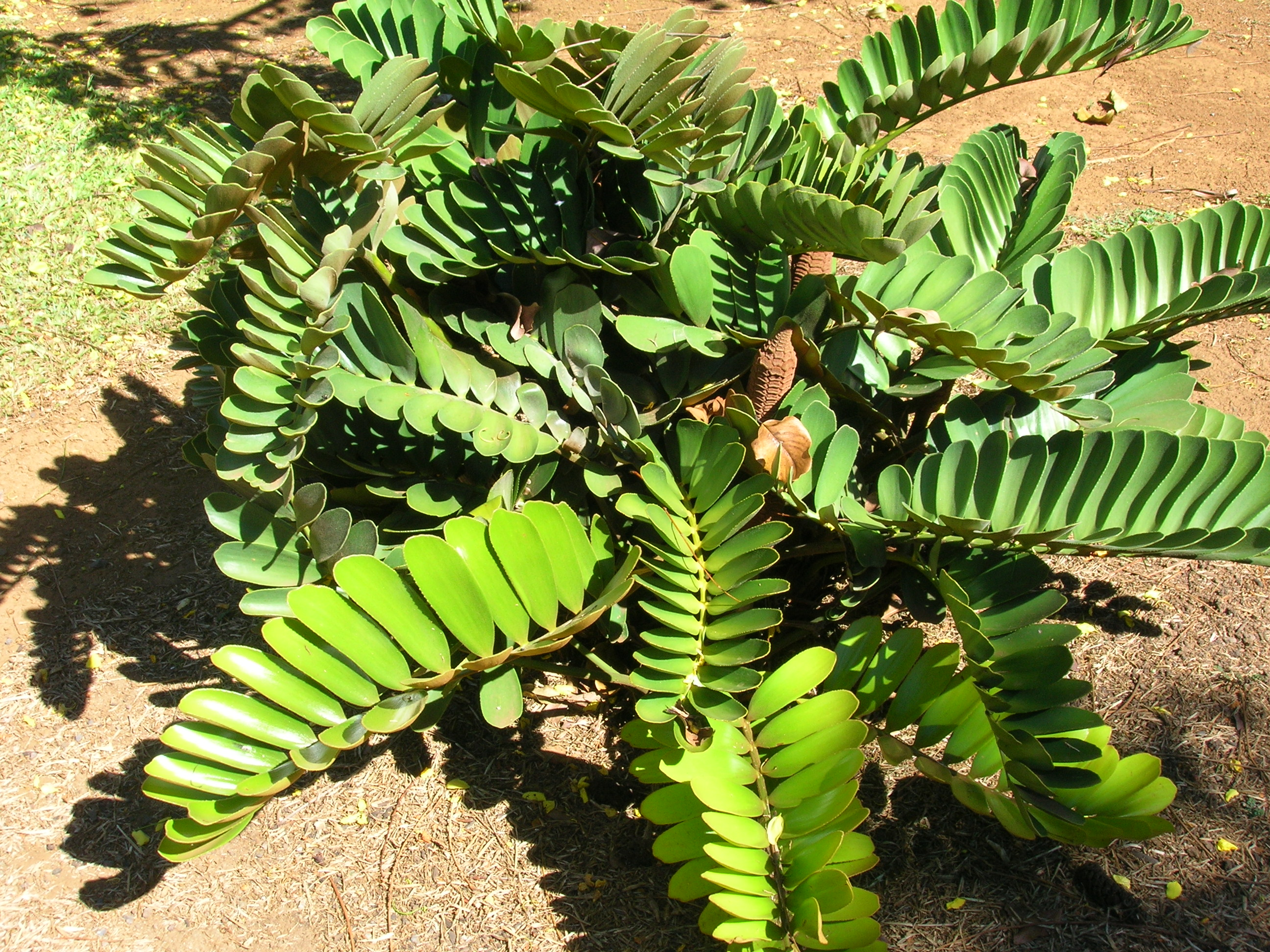
- Zamia furfuracea

Scientific classification
- Kingdom: Plantae
- Clade: Tracheophytes
- Clade: Gymnosperms
- Division: Cycadophyta
- Class: Cycadopsida
- Order: Cycadales
- Family: Zamiaceae
- Subtribe: Zamiinae
- Genus: Zamia; L.

Type species
- Zamia pumila L.

Species
- See List of Zamia species

Synonyms
- Aulacophyllum Regel; Chigua D.W.Stev.; Palmifolium Kuntze; Palma-filix Adans.

= Zamia =

Zamia Temporal range: Late Cretaceous–Present

Genus of cycads

Zamia is a genus of cycad of the family Zamiaceae, native to North America from the United States (in Georgia and Florida) throughout the West Indies, Central America, and South America as far south as Bolivia. The genus is considered to be the most ecologically and morphologically diverse of the cycads, and is estimated to have originated about 68.3 million years ago.

== Description ==
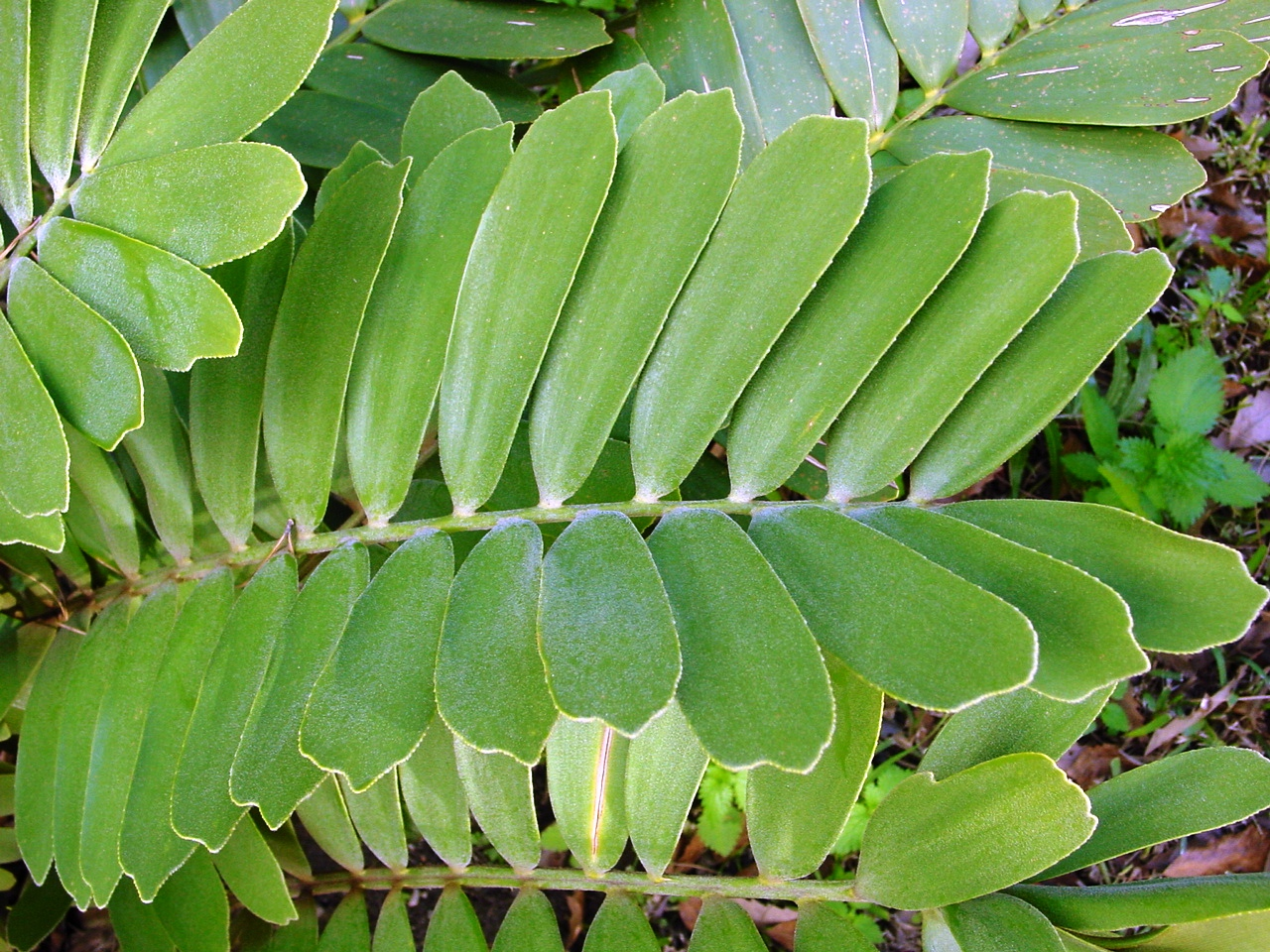
Zamia furfuracea leaves

The genus comprises deciduous shrubs with aerial or subterranean circular stems, often superficially resembling palms. They produce spirally arranged, pinnate leaves which are pubescent, at least when young, having branched and simple, transparent and coloured hairs. The articulated leaflets lack a midrib, and are broad with subparallel dichotomous venation. Lower leaflets are not reduced to spines, though the petioles often have prickles. The emerging leaves of many Zamia species are striking, some emerging with a reddish or bronze cast (Z. roezlii being an example). Z. picta is even more distinctive, being the only truly variegated cycad (having whitish/yellow speckles on the leaves).

Like all Zamiaceae, Zamia plants have "coralloid" (coral-shaped) roots which host nitrogen-fixing cyanobacteria. Stems are 3 to 25 centimetres (1.2 to 9.8 in) in diameter, and when arboreal, up to 5 metres (16 ft) tall. Leaves vary from 2 to up to 15 in number, and have an even number (5 to 60 pairs) of leaflets. petioles (leaf stalks) and rachis (leaf axis, to which leaflets are attached) may be smooth, or have prickles on the petiole and lower part of the rachis. Leaflets are linear to ovate and may be directly attached to the rachis, or may be on short petiolules. The edges of leaflets may be smooth, or may be toothed partly or around the whole leaflet. The morphology of leaflets is highly varied between even closely related species of Zamia, and within species and even within populations of a species. Studies have found that the amount of sun a plant is exposed to is responsible for differences in leaflet length, width, surface area, width ratio, shape, and density and thickness of leaflets. There is also significant morphological variation in leaflets between male and female plants in some species.

== Reproduction ==
Zamia sporophylls are born in vertical rows in cones, and the megasporophyll apices are faceted or flattened, not spinose. The fleshy seeds are subglobular to oblong or ellipsoidal, and are red, orange, yellow or rarely white. The endosperm is haploid, derived from the female gametophyte. The embryo is straight, with two cotyledons that are usually united at the tips and a very long, spirally twisted suspensor. The sperm of members from the genus are large, as is typical of cycads, and Z. roezlii is an example; its sperm are approximately 0.4 mm long and can be seen by the unaided eye.

Seed-dispersal in Zamia is poorly documented for most species, but there are reports of birds and/or small to medium-sized mammals dispersing the seeds of a few Zamia species.

=== Pollination by insects ===
It was long believed that Zamia plants, like all cycads, relied completely on wind pollination. In the 1980s it was discovered that at least some Zamia species were pollinated by beetles of the Pharaxonotha and Rhopalotria genera. Further studies have found that pollination by beetles is widespread in Zamia and other cycads. Fossils are now understood to indicate that cycads and beetles have been associated since the early Jurassic, about 200 million years ago.

Pollen occurs in sticky clumps in the male cones. The clumps are broken up when Pharaxonotha beetles feed on them, scattering pollen grains throughout the interiors of the cone. Both Pharaxonotha and Rhopalotria adults, if present, become covered with pollen grains and then move to a female cone. As the beetles crawl around in female cones, a droplet at the tip of each micropyle (an opening into the ovule which will produce a seed) can capture a pollen grain as a beetle crawls past.

=== Thermogenesis ===
Cycads, including Zamia species, are thermogenic, capable of raising the temperature of tissues in reproductive cones. Thermogenesis has been measured in 17 Zamia species, with the temperature of male (pollen) and female (ovule) cones (strobili) varying daily (Zamia plants are dioecious, with male and female cones on separate plants). Male cones ready to shed pollen heat up early in the evening, and then cool down, while receptive female cones heat up about three hours later and then cool down. Thermogenesis in reproductive cones typically occurs daily for about two weeks.

The reproductive cones of cycads, including Zamia, emit combinations of volatiles that produce a distinctive odor. The odors may be distinctive for each species of Zamia, or for each species of pollinator. Male and female cones of a particular Zamia species emit nearly identical odors, although the odor produced by female cones is usually weaker than that produced by the male cones of the same species. The emission of odors is enhanced by the thermogenetic heating of the cones, and the movement of pollinating beetles between cones correlates with changes in temperature and odor level.

Pharaxonotha and Rhopalotria beetles associated with Zamia species have receptors for infrared radiation on their antennae, by which they appear to detect the elevated temperature of the cones on Zamia plants. Beetles have been observed moving to cones on male plants when the cone's temperature is elevated, crawling into openings in the cone and emerging covered with pollen, and then moving to the cones on female plants when their temperature is elevated, again crawling into openings in the cone, presumably transferring the pollen.

== Habitats ==
With one exception, Zamia species are found only in the Neotropical realm in the Americas. The exception is Z. integrifolia, which has a range that extends into the Nearctic realm in northern Florida, and formerly into the southeastern corner of Georgia.

== Toxicity ==
The primary toxin in Zamia plants is cycasin, a carcinogenic and neurotoxic glucoside. Other glucoside toxins present include macrozamin (de) and several neocycasins. BMAA, a neurotoxin that is produced by cyanobacteria living in roots of the plants, is also present in most Zamia plants.

Many of the Zamia species are, or have been, gathered to process the stem and/or seeds into starch for use as food or laundry starch, or for use as traditional medicine. Since almost the entire plant is very toxic, the starch must be grated and repeatedly washed to remove the toxins and make the starch edible. Only the sarcotesta, the pulpy covering of the seeds, is relatively free of toxins.

Consumption of cycads by livestock has resulted in two forms of cycad toxicosis. Hepato-gastrointestinal toxicosis results from damage to the liver and gastrointestinal tracts of affected animals causing depression, anorexia, and weight loss. Neurologic toxicosis, known as Zamia staggers, is the result of damage to brain, spinal cord, and dorsal root ganglia tissue causing weight loss, swaying of hind quarters, and weakness and other defects in rear limbs.

== Herbivory ==
=== Lepidoptera ===
The presence of toxins protects Zamia plants from most herbivores, but caterpillars of the genus Eumaeus are obligate herbivores of cycads, including Zamia species. Eumaeus caterpillars have aposematic coloration, being bright red with yellow or white bands, and adults have red elements on their body and wings. The caterpillars sequester and retain the toxins consumed from Zamia plant tissue, rendering all stages of Eumaeus distasteful to predators. With few exceptions, Zamia species host only one species of Eumaeus caterpillars each.

The known host dependencies of Eumaeus species on Zamia species include: Species in the Florida/Caribbean Clade are hosts for caterpillars of Eumaeus atala. Species in the Fischeri Clade, and Z. cremnophila of the Mega-Mexico A sub-clade, are hosts for caterpillars of E. childrenae. Some species in the Z. loddigesii species complex of the Mega-Mexico A sub-clade are hosts for caterpillars of E. toxea. Many species in the South American West of the Andes Clade are hosts for caterpillars of E. godartii. Several species in the South American East of the Andes Clade are hosts for caterpillars of E. minyas. One Zamia species found east of the Andes, Z. poeppigiana, is host for caterpillars of both E. minyas and E. toxana. Another Zamia species east of the Andes, Z. amazonum, also hosts caterpillars of E. toxana. The use of other Zamia species as hosts for Eumaeus species had not been established as of 2023.

Caterpillars of the moths Seirarctia echo and Anatrachyntis badia have also been observed on Zamia integrifolia, and caterpillars of an unknown species of a Blastobasidae moth have been observed on Zamia pumila.

=== Coleoptera ===
Beetles of the genera Pharaxonotha and Rhopalotria are the only known pollinators of Zamia species. Species of both genera live in and consume the male cones of Zamia plants. The adults and first instars of Pharaxonotha larvae feed exclusively on pollen. The later instars of Pharaxonotha larvae and all stages of Rhopalotria eat the tissue of the male cone, even hollowing out the Pedicel (stem) of the cone. Toxins in sporophyll tissue in reproductive cones are initially sequestered in idioblast cells. The idioblasts in female cones release their toxic contents shortly before the cones become receptive to pollen, but the idioblasts in male cones remain intact. As beetle larvae can eat around idioblasts, or swallow idioblasts whole and pass them intact through their digestive systems, they can safely feed on the tissue in the male cones, but not on the female cones.

== Conservation ==
Most species of Zamia are prized as ornamental plants, but are difficult to propagate and slow growing. As a result, Zamia plants are often over-collected, threatening to wipe out populations or whole species. In order to protect wild populations, scientists working with Zamia species no longer publish the exact locations of populations.

== Karyology ==
Zamia is the only genus in the cycads that has variation in karyotypes between species, specifically in the chromosome number. Diploid chromosome numbers in Zamia include 2n=16, 17, 18, 19, 20, 21, 22, 23, 24, 25, 26, 27, and 28. Some Zamia species have varying numbers of diploid chromosomes within the species. The odd diploid chromosome numbers occur in species with more than one chromosome number.

== Phylogeny ==
Cycad tree

- Cycads
  - - Cycadaceae
      Cycas
  - - Zamiaceae
      - Diooideae
        Dioon
      - Zamioideae
        - Encephalarteae
          - Macrozamia
          - - Lepidozamia
            - Encephalartos
        - Zamieae
          - Bowenia
          - - - Ceratozamia
              - Stangeria
            - - Zamia
              - Microcycas

The genus Zamia is a cycad, a type of gymnosperm. Gymnosperms are seed plants that do not have flowers. Cycads are formally the Division Cycadophyta, Class Cycadopsida, Order Cycadales. Cycadales includes two families, Cycadaceae and Zamiaceae. Cycadaceae has one genus, Cycas. Zamiaceae has nine genera, including Zamia.

Despite the ancient history of cycads, species diversity in Zamia is geologically recent. Calonje et al. found a stem age for Zamia of 68.28 million years ago (mya), and a crown age of 9.54 mya.

=== Geographic groups ===
As early as the 1930s, authors recognized three biogeographic groups in Zamia, Caribbean, Mesoamerican, and Central and South America. In the 21st century, phylogenies of Zamia based on molecular phylogenetic analyses have found stronger correlation with geographic regions than with morphological features.

Zonneveld and Lindström (2016) measured genome size in 71 species of Zamia and found support for three geographical groupings. Variation in genome size of Zamia species is fairly small compared to many other genera, with the ratio of largest to smallest just 1.36, but the authors found significant differences in genome sizes between three geographical areas. Species in Mega Mexico, including the northern part of Central America, had the largest average genome size. Species in South America, plus Costa Rica and Panama, had the smallest average genome size, while species in the Caribbean Islands and Florida had an intermediate genome size.

Zamia tree based on DNA

- Zamia
  - <Caribbean and Florida 8 sp.
  - - <Mesoamerica 21 sp.
    - - Zamia soconuscensis
      - - <Isthmus 16 sp.
        - <South America 28 sp.

Calonje, et al. (2019) analyzed the DNA from 70 species of Zamia, finding support for four geographically distinct clades (plus a single isolated species). A clade including the species found on the Caribbean islands and in Florida is sister to the rest of the genus. The species of the Caribbean clade have diverged within the last 1.9 million years. The Mesoamerica clade includes all species found in Mesoamerica (north of Nicaragua), except for the single species Z. soconuscensis. It has a divergence age of 5.79 mya. The Isthmus clade includes species found in southernmost Nicaragua, Costa Rica. Panama, and northernmost Colombia, and has a divergence age of 2.35 mya. The species in South America form another clade, which is sister to the Isthmus clade. It has a divergence age of 2.62 mya.

Zamia tree based on transcriptomes

- Zamia
  - - I
      <Caribbean Islands and Florida 8 sp.
    - II
      <Fischeri Clade 3 sp.
  - - III
      - III‑A
        <Mega Mexico A 14 sp.
      - III‑B
        <Mega Mexico B 7 sp.
    - - - IV
          Zamia soconuscensis
        - - V
            <Isthmus 15 sp.
          - - VI
              <West of the Andes 12 sp.
            - VII
              - <Northern Colombia
                (Manicata clade) 4 sp.
              - <East of the Andes 13 sp.

Lindstrom et al. (2024) analyzed transcriptomes from 77 species of Zamia finding support for seven clades of the genus occupying distinct geographical ranges. Clade I is a strongly monophyletic clade that includes eight of the species of the Caribbean islands and Florida. Clade II (the Fischeri clade), consists of three species found in Veracruz, Hidalgo, Querétaro, San Luis Potosí, and Tamaulipas states in Mexico. This clade is a sister to Clade I, with the group of Clade I and Clade II being sister to the rest of the genus. Clade III (Mega Mexico) is divided into the sub-clades III-A and III-B. Clade III-A includes 14 species found in Mexico and northern Central America. Clade III-B consists of seven species found in Honduras, Guatemala, and Belize. Clade IV consists of the single species Z. soconuscensis found in Chiapas state in Mexico. Clade V (the Isthmus clade) includes 15 species found in southern Nicaragua, Costa Rica, Panama, and northern Colombia. Clade VI includes 12 species found in southernmost Panama and west of the Andes in Colombia and Ecuador. Clade VII consists of four closely related species in northern Columbia (the Manicata clade) and 13 species east of the Andes in Bolivia, Brazil, Colombia, Ecuador, Peru, and Venezuela.

=== Clades and species complexes ===
==== Caribbean and Florida Clade (I) ====
All of the species in the Caribbean and Florida Clade (I) are also in the Zamia pumila species complex. The classification of the populations in the Greater Antilles, Bahamas, and Florida has been controversial. In 1980, Eckenwalder included all the Zamia populations in the Caribbean and Florida in the single species Z. pumila, incorporating 27 previously described species (not all of which were valid or accepted at the time) into the subspecies Z. pumila subsp. pumila, and five such species from Cuba into the subspecies Z. pumila subsp. pygmaea. Eckenwalder's classification is no longer generally accepted, and a monophyletic species complex consisting of eight species is now accepted, including Z. pumila, six other species corresponding to combinations of the species subsumed into Eckenwalder's Z. pumila subsp. pumila, and Z. pygmaea, consisting of the former species placed by Eckenwalder in Z. pumila subsp. pygmaea. A 2009 study found support for the species complex in the presence of the same four discrete clusters of DNA repeats in Z. integrifolia, Z. portoricensis, and Z. pumila. The other species in this complex were not examined in that study.

==== Fischeri Clade (II) ====
The Fischeri Clade (II) consists of three closely related species of Zamia found near the Gulf coast of central Mexico. The three species, Z. fischeri, Z. inermis, and Z. vazquezii, share various morphological features, including the near or total absence of prickles on leaf stalks. The analysis of DNA by Calonje, et al. found strong support for the Fischeri Clade as sister to all of the mainland Zamia species (i.e., everything except the Caribbean and Florida Clade). The analysis of transcriptomes by Lindstrom et al. found strong support for the Fischeri Clade as sister to the Caribbean and Florida Clade, with the combined Caribbean and Florida and Fischeri clades sister to the rest of Zamia. The Fischeri and Caribbean and Florida clades share several morphological traits, including the lack or near-lack of prickles on leaf stalks and similarities in reproductive characters. The genome sizes of the species in the Fischeri Clade are among the smallest in Zamia.

==== Mega Mexico A Clade (III-A) ====
Mega-Mexico Clade III-A tree

- Mega‑Mexico Clade III‑A
  - Zamia meermanii
  - - <Purpurea Clade 6 sp.
    - <Furfuracea Clade 7 sp.

The Mega Mexico A Clade (III-A) defined by Lindstrom, et al. in 2024 includes 14 species found in Mexico and northern Central America (Belize, El Salvador, Guatemala, and Honduras). The 2019 study of DNA in Zamia by Calonje, et al. found a clade of 12 species, called the Mexico Clade, all of which are included in the Mega-Mexico A Clade.

A study published in 2008 proposed a Zamia katzeriana species complex, consisting of Z. katzeriana, Z. cremnophila, Z. lacandona, Z. purpurea, and Z. splendens. The 2019 Calonje et al. study found a clade of five species, called the Purpurea Clade, that included Z. cremnophila, Z. lacandona, Z. purpurea, Z. splendens, and Z. grijalvensis, which shared four species with the Zamia katzeriana species complex. Z. katzeriana itself was not included in the 2019 study. Z. grijalvensis was described in 2012, after the 2008 study that defined the species complex. All of the species in the Zamia katzeriana species complex are endemic to Mexico.

A genetic study published in 2009 found a basis for a Zamia loddigesii species complex in the presence of the same four discrete clusters of DNA repeats in Z. loddigesii, Z. furfuracea, Z. picta, Z. paucijuga, Z. polymorpha, Z. purpurea, Z. spartea, Z. splendens, and Z. sylvatica. (After the study was published, Z. sylvatica was reclassified as a synonym of Z. loddigesii, Z. picta was reclassified as a synonym of Z. variegata, and Z. polymorpha was reclassified as a synonym of Z. prasina.) All of the species in the Zamia katzeriana species complex are found in Mexico, with three of those species being found in other countries in northern Central America.

The 2019 DNA study found a clade of seven species, the Furfuracea Clade, that included Z. furfuracea, Z. herrerae, Z. loddigesii, Z. paucijuga, Z. prasina, Z. spartea, and Z. variegata. Six of the species in the Furfuracea Clade were also defined in the Zamia loddigesii species complex, with Z. herrerae added to the Furfuracea Clade and Z. purpurea and Z. splendens removed from it.

Z. meermanii, which is sister to the rest of Mega Mexico A Clade in the 2024 transcriptomes study, has not been described as belonging to either the Z. katzeriana species complex or the Z. lodigessii species complex. It is endemic to Belize, and the only species in the Mega Mexico A Clade that has not been found in Mexico. The 2019 DNA study placed Z. meermani in the Tuerckheimii Clade, equivalent to the Mega-Mexico B Clade.

==== Mega-Mexico B Clade (III-B) ====
The Mega-Mexico B Clade (III-B) consists of seven species found in Honduras, Guatemala, and Belize, including Z. decumbens, Z. monticola, Z. onan-reyesii, Z. oreillyi, Z. sandovalii, Z. standleyi, and Z. tuerckheimii.

The 2019 DNA study found a clade of six species, the Tuerckheimii Clade, that included Z. decumbens, Z. onan-reyesii, Z. meermani, Z. sandovalii, Z. standleyi, and Z. tuerckheimii. Five of the species in the Tuerckheimii Clade were also defined in the Mega Mexico B Clade, with Z. meermani not included in the Mega Mexico B Clade and Z. monticola and Z. oreillyi added to it.

==== Isthmus Clade (V) ====
Isthmus V tree

- Isthmus Clade V
  - - <Acuminata Clade 4 sp.
    - - <Skinneri Clade 6 sp.
      - Zamia lindleyi
  - - - <Obliqua Clade 3 sp.
      - Zamia dressleri
    - Zamia pseudoparasitica

The Isthmus Clade (V) includes 15 species, all of which occur in Panama. A few species have ranges that extend into Costa Rica and, in a couple of cases, southernmost Nicaragua. One species is also found in northernmost Colombia. The 2024 study based on transcriptomes found three unnamed sub-clades in the Isthmus Clade. One sub-clade, consisting of Zamia nana, Zamia acuminata, Zamia fairchildiana, and Zamia pseudomonticola, was called the Acuminata Clade in the 2019 study based on DNA. Three of the deepest nested species in another sub-clade, Zamia elegantissima, Zamia stevensonii, and Zamia obliqua, were placed in the Obliqua Clade in the 2019 study.

Five of the six species in the third sub-clade have previously been placed in the Zamia skinneri species complex. Z. skinneri has been regarded as a highly variable species. Z. neurophyllidia was described as a new species in 1993, based on a population of what had been regarded as a dwarf form of Z. skinneri. A study published in 2004 proposed that Z. neurophyllidia and Z. skinneri were a "hybrid species complex", and noted that Z. skinneri included several morphologically distinct populations. In 2008, three sub-populations of Z. skinneri were described as the new species Z. hamannii, Z. imperialis, and Z. nesophila. All five of the species in this complex are found in Bocas del Toro Province in Panama, at least three of the species are endemic to that province, and all of them have plicate leaves, a trait that occurs elsewhere in Zamia only in Z. dressleri in Colon and Guna Yala (formerly San Blas) provinces in Panama, and in Z. roezlii and Z. wallisii in Colombia. It has been suggested that Z. skinneri is the central species of the complex, and that the other species have evolved rapidly from Z. skinneri on the periphery of its range due to geographic or other isolation. The 2019 DNA study places the same five species in a Skinneri Clade. Both the 2019 DNA study and the 2024 transcriptomes study place Z. lindleyi as sister to the Skinneri Clade.

==== South America West of the Andes (VI) ====
South America West of the Andes (VI) tree

- South America (VI)
  - - <Cunaria Clade 4 sp.
    - <Wallisii Clade 3 sp.
  - <Pacific Clade 5 sp.

The South America West of the Andes Clade includes 12 species, most of which are found in Colombia. A few also occur in Ecuador, and one each is found in Panama and Peru. The 2019 DNA study defined three sub-clades: a Pacific Clade consisting of Z. gentryi, Z. amplifolia, Z. roezlii, Z. chigua, and Z. lindenii, which includes all of the species found in Ecuador and Peru; a Wallisii Clade consisting of Z. wallisii and Z. oligodonta that was strongly supported by morphological as well as molecular data; the 2024 transcriptomes study added Z. montana, which was not included in the 2019 study, to that clade; and a Cunaria Clade consisting of Z. cunaria, Z. ipetiensis, and Z. pyrophylla. The 2024 transcriptomes study added Z. paucifoliolata to the Cunaria clade.

==== South America East of the Andes VII ====
South America East of the Andes (VII) tree

- South America (VII)
  - - <Manicata Clade 6* sp.
    - Zamia incognita
  - - <Tolimensis Clade 2 sp.
    - - <Eastern Clade 6 sp.
      - <Amazonian Clade 4 sp.

Note:* Per Calonje et al. 2021. See discussion below.

The 2019 DNA study identified four clades in what the 2024 transcriptomes study defined as the South America East of the Andes Clade. The first of those clades is the Manicata clade. In 1996, Caputo et al. described a "Manicata clade" consisting of Zamia manicata, Z. cunaria, Z. obliqua, and Z. iepetiensis. Later molecular phylogenetic studies have produced a different definition of the clade, with Z. manicata being the only species included in the new definition. The Manicata Clade is a group of closely related species found in northern Colombia. It consists of Z. manicata, Z. disodon, Z. melanorrhacis, Z. restrepoi, Z. imbricata, and Z. sinuensis. Z. manicata was described in 1876. The other species in the clade have been described more recently, with Z. restrepoi described in 1990 (as Chigua restrepoi, reclassified as Z. restrepoi in 2009), Z. disodon and Z. melanorrhacis in 2001, and Z. imbricata and Z. sinuensis in 2021. The monophyly of the clade is strongly supported by molecular phylogenetic studies. Calonje, et al. (2019) found Z. manicata, Z. disodon, Z. melanorrhacis, and Z. restrepoi to form a clade. Lindstrom et al. (2024) found Z. manicata, Z. disodon, Z. restrepoi, and Z. sinuensis to form a clade. While Z. imbricata was not included in either analysis, it shares several morphological features with the rest of the clade, including subterranean or semi-subterranean stems, strongly toothed margins on leaflets, strobili (cones) on very long stalks, small seeds with very thin sarcotesta (coats), and very small pollen (male) cones. Leaf morphology varies strongly among the members of the clade. The 2019 DNA study placed the Manicata Clade as sister to the rest of the South America Clade, while the 2024 transcriptomes study found the Manicata Clade to be in the East of the Andes Clade, and sister to the rest of the Clade.

The 2019 study defined a second Clade, the Eastern Clade, consisting of Z. encephalartoides, Z. muricata, and Z. lecointei. The 2024 study includes an unnamed Clade consisting of those three species plus Zamia amazonum, Z. ulei, and Z. orinoquiensis (neither Z. ulei nor Z. orinoquiensis were included in the 2019 study). The third Clade defined in the 2019 study, the Amazonian Clade, contains Z. amazonum, Z. poeppigiana, Z. boliviana, Z. macrochiera, and Z. hymenophyllidia. The 2024 study includes an unnamed Clade consisting of Z. poeppigiana, Z. boliviana, Z. macrochiera, Z. hymenophyllida, Z. amazonum, and Z. urep. Both the 2019 study and the 2024 study found a small Clade consisting of Z. huilensis and Z. tolimensis, which was labeled the Tolimensis Clade in the 2019 study. This Clade was found to be sister to the Eastern Clade in the 2019 study, and sister to the group consisting of the Eastern and Amazonian clades in the 2024 study.

=== Species ===
The delimitation of species in Zamia has been problematic. Early taxonomy of the genus was based primarily on leaflet morphology, including leaflet shape, vein number, leaflets per leaf, and apex shape. Based on differences in leaflet morphology, named species proliferated, with 128 species of Zamia having been named by the 1980s, often based on a single specimen of unknown type site. Many of those proposed species have been moved to other genera or synonymized with accepted Zamia species. By 1985, moreover, it had been demonstrated that leaflet morphology was influenced by environment and thus not necessarily useful for distinguishing species. It is now recognized that reproductive structures, especially female strobili (cones), are essential to distinguishing species of Zamia.

The number of recognized species in Zamia has almost tripled since 1980. There were approximately 30 species recognized in 1980, 40 in 1988, 58 in 2008, 76 in 2016, and 80 in 2019. As of July 2026, the World List of Cycads lists 90 accepted species of Zamia, the Royal Botanic Gardens, Kew, recognizes 86, and World Flora Online recognizes 89.

== Sources ==
- Cafasso, D.; Cozzolino, S.; Vereecken, N. J.; De Luca, P.; Chinali, G. (March 21, 2009). "Organization of a dispersed repeated DNA element in the Zamia genome". Biologia Plantarum. 53 (1): 28–36. Bibcode:2009BioPl..53...28C. doi:10.1007/s10535-009-0005-3. hdl:2013/ULB-DIPOT:oai:dipot.ulb.ac.be:2013/122983.
- Calonje, Michael; Meerow, Alan W.; Griffith, M. Patrick; Sala-Leiva, Dayana; Vovides, Andrew P.; Ciro, Mario; Francisco-Ortega, Javier (May 2019). "A Time-Calibrated Species Tree Phylogeny of the New World Cycad Genus Zamia L. (Zamiaceae, Cycadyles)". International Journal of Plant Sciences. 180 (4): 271–355. Bibcode:2019IJPlS.180..286C. doi:10.1086/702642.
- Calonje, Michael; Castro Hernández, Jonatan; Coca, Luis Fernando; Jaramillo, Daniel; Aristizábal, Arturo (16 April 2021). "Two new species of Zamia (Zamiaceae, Cycadales) from the Magdalena-Urabá moist forests ecoregion of northern Colombia". Phytotaxa. 497 (1): 1–19. Bibcode:2021Phytx.497....1C. doi:10.11646/phytotaxa.497.1.1. ISSN 1179-3163.
- Eckenwalder, James E. (October 1980). "Taxonomy of the West Indian cycads". Journal of the Arnold Arboretum. 61 (4): 701–722. doi:10.5962/bhl.part.8542. JSTOR 43782079.
- Gutiérrez-Ortega, José Said; Pérez-Farrera, Miguel Angel; Lopez, Sergio; Vovides, Andrew P (May 2023). "Demographic history and species delimitation of three Zamia species (Zamiaceae) in south-eastern Mexico: Z. katzeriana is not a product of hybridization". Botanical Journal of the Linnean Society. 202 (1): 110–133. doi:10.1093/botlinnean/boac062. ISSN 0024-4074.
- Lindstrom, Anders J. (February 2009). "Typification of some species names in Zamia L. ( Zamiaceae ), with an assessment of the status of Chigua D. Stev". Taxon. 58 (1): 265–270. Bibcode:2009Taxon..58..265L. doi:10.1002/tax.581025. ISSN 0040-0262.
- Lindstrom, Anders; Nabib, Sadaf; Dong, Shanshan; Dong, Yiqing; Liu, Jiang; Calonje, Michael; Stevenson, Dennis; Zhang, Shouzhou (2024). "Transcriptome sequencing data provide a solid base to understand phylogenetic relationships, biogeography and reticulated evolution of the genus Zamia L. (Cycadales, Zamiaceae)". Annals of Botany. XX (5): 747–768. doi:10.1093/aob/mcae065. PMC 11560380. PMID 38900840.
- Nicolalde-Morejón, Fernando; Vovides, Andrew P.; Stevenson, Dennis W.; Sosa, Victoria (March 2008). "The identity of Zamia katzeriana and Z. verschaffeltii (Zamiaceae)". Brittonia. 60 (1): 38–48. Bibcode:2008Britt..60...38N. doi:10.1007/s12228-008-9000-9. ISSN 1938-436X.
- Nicolalde-Morejón, Fernando; Vovides, Andrew P.; Stevenson, Dennis W. (9 December 2009). "Taxonomic revision of Zamia in Mega-Mexico". Brittonia. 61 (4): 301–335. Bibcode:2009Britt..61..301N. doi:10.1007/s12228-009-9077-9. ISSN 0007-196X.
- Norstog, Knut J.; Fawcett, Priscilla K. S.; Vovides, Andrew P. (1992-12-31). "Beetle pollination of two species of Zamia: evolutionary and ecological considerations". Journal of Palaeosciences. 41 (1–3): 149–158. doi:10.54991/jop.1992.1116. ISSN 2583-4266.
- Schutzman, B.; Vovides, A. P.; Dehgan, B. (1988). "Two new species of Zamia (Zamiaceae, Cycadales) from southern Mexico" (PDF). Botanical Gazette. 149 (3): 358–359. Bibcode:1988BoGaz.149..347S. doi:10.1086/337725.
- Segalla, Rosane; Telles, Francismeire Jane; Pinhiero, Fabio; Morellato, Patricia (October 22, 2019). "A Review of Current Knowledge of Zamiaceae, with Emphasis on Zamia From South America". Tropical Conservation Science. 12 1940082919877479. doi:10.1177/1940082919877479.
- Sierra-Botero, Laura; Calonje, Michael; Robbins, Robert K.; Rosser, Neil; Pierce, Naomi E.; López-Gallego, Cristina; Valencia-Montoya, Wendy A. (April 2023). "Cycad phylogeny predicts host plant use of Eumaeus butterflies". Ecology and Evolution. 13 (4) e9978. Bibcode:2023EcoEv..13E9978S. doi:10.1002/ece3.9978. ISSN 2045-7758. PMC 10085819. PMID 37056692.
- Stevenson, Dennis Wm. (1 March 2004). "Cycads of Colombia". The Botanical Review. 70 (2): 194–234. doi:10.1663/0006-8101(2004)070[0194:COC]2.0.CO;2. ISSN 1874-9372.
- Terry, Irene; Tang, William; Taylor, A.; Donaldson, John; Singh, Rita; Vovides, Andrew; Cibrian-Jaramillo, Angelica (2012). "An overview of cycad pollination studies". Memoirs of the New York Botanical Garden. 106: 352–394 – via ResearchGate.
- Valencia-Montoya, Wendy A.; Lienard, Marjorie; Rosser, Neil; Calonje, Michael; Salzman, Shayla; Tsai, Cheng-Chia; Yu, Nanfang; Carlson, John R.; Cogni, Rodrigo; Pierce, Naomi E.; Bellono, Nicholas W. (11 December 2025). "Infrared radiation is an ancient pollination signal". Science. 390 (6778): 1164–1170. doi:10.1126/science.adz1728. ISSN 0036-8075. PMID 41379967.
- Whitaker, Melissa R. L.; Salzman, Shayla (2020). Turlings, Ted (ed.). "Ecology and evolution of cycad-feeding Lepidoptera". Ecology Letters. 23 (12): 1862–1877. Bibcode:2020EcolL..23.1862W. doi:10.1111/ele.13581. ISSN 1461-023X. PMID 32969575.
- Zonneveld, B. J. M.; Lindström, A. J. (26 May 2016). "Genome sizes for 71 species of Zamia (Cycadales: Zamiaceae) correspond to three different biogeographic regions". Nordic Journal of Botany. 34 (6): 744–751. Bibcode:2016NorJB..34..744Z. doi:10.1111/njb.01094.
