= Zamia pyrophylla =

Scientific classification
- Kingdom: Plantae
- Clade: Tracheophytes
- Clade: Gymnospermae
- Division: Cycadophyta
- Class: Cycadopsida
- Order: Cycadales
- Family: Zamiaceae
- Genus: Zamia
- Species: Z. pyrophylla

Binomial name
- Zamia pyrophylla Calonje, D.W.Stev. & A.Lindstr.

Species of cycad

Zamia pyrophylla is a species of cycad in the family Zamiaceae.
