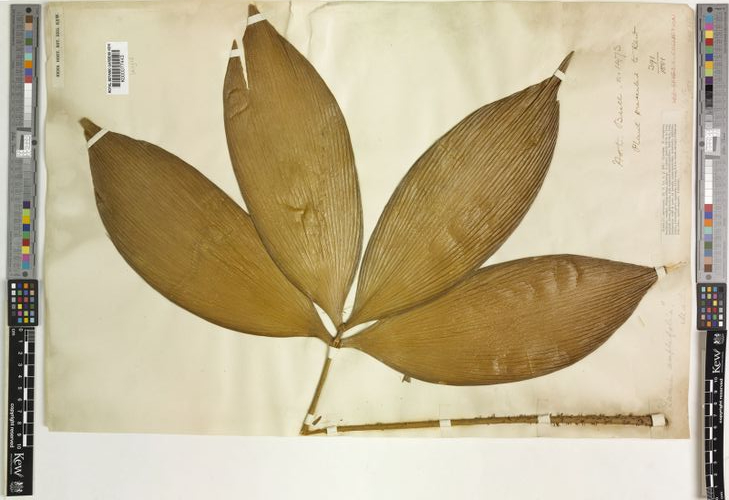

Conservation status
- Endangered (IUCN 3.1)

Scientific classification
- Kingdom: Plantae
- Clade: Tracheophytes
- Clade: Gymnospermae
- Division: Cycadophyta
- Class: Cycadopsida
- Order: Cycadales
- Family: Zamiaceae
- Genus: Zamia
- Species: Z. amplifolia

Binomial name
- Zamia amplifolia Mast.

= Zamia amplifolia =

Species of cycad

Zamia amplifolia is a species of plant in the family Zamiaceae. It is endemic to the Calima River watershed of Valle del Cauca Department, Colombia.

== Description ==
Zamia amplifolia is a bush or small tree, with a stem up to 2.5 metres (8 ft 2 in) tall. There are three to six leaves on a plant, 1 to 2 metres (3 ft 3 in to 6 ft 7 in) long, with a 0.5 to 1 metre (1 ft 8 in to 3 ft 3 in) long petiole (stalk). The stalk is covered with prickles, which may extend into the lower third of the leaf axis. There are six to ten leaflets, which are elliptical, pointed at the ends and with smooth edges. Leaflets in the middle of the leaf are 30 to 50 centimetres (12 to 20 in) long and 12 to 15 centimetres (4.7 to 5.9 in) wide. The specific name amplifolia technically refers to the size of the leaves, but was intended to refer to the very large leaflets.

Like all Zamias, Z. amplifolia is dioecious, with each plant being either male or female. Male strobili (cones) are cylindrical to elongate-cylindrical, 8 to 12 centimetres (3.1 to 4.7 in) long and 1 to 2 centimetres (0.39 to 0.79 in) in diameter, and cream to tan in color. Female cones are ovoid to ovoid-cylindrical, 20 to 40 centimetres (7.9 to 15.7 in) long and 8 to 12 centimetres (3.1 to 4.7 in) in diameter, brown in color, and stand on shortpeduncles (stalks). Seeds are ovoid, 1.5 to 2.5 centimetres (0.59 to 0.98 in) in diameter, and have a red sarcotesta (outer fleshy coat).

== Distribution ==
Zamia amplifolia appears to be very rare, with a very limited distribution. It has been found at only three locations very near the neotype location, and, as of 2004, had been found only four times since it was first described in 1878. Z. amplifolia is close in appearance to Z. skinneri, found in Panama, with the primary difference being that Z. amplifolia has smooth leaflet edges while those of Z. skinneri are toothed.

== Sources ==
- Stevenson, Dennis Wm. (April 2004). "Cycads of Colombia". The Botanical Review. 70 (2): 194–234. doi:10.1663/0006-8101(2004)070[0194:COC]2.0.CO;2. ISSN 1874-9372.
