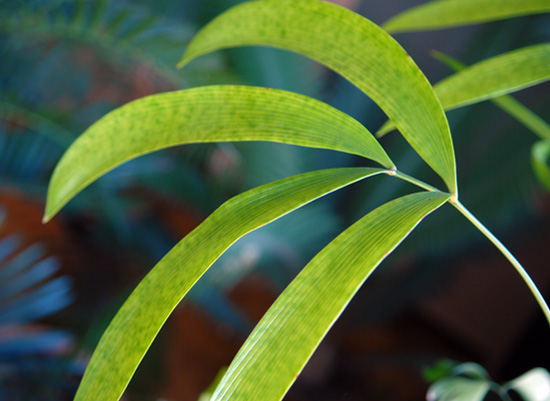

Conservation status
- Least Concern (IUCN 3.1)

Scientific classification
- Kingdom: Plantae
- Clade: Tracheophytes
- Clade: Gymnospermae
- Division: Cycadophyta
- Class: Cycadopsida
- Order: Cycadales
- Family: Zamiaceae
- Genus: Zamia
- Species: Z. roezlii

Binomial name
- Zamia roezlii Linden

Synonyms
- Aulacophyllum roezlii (Regel ex Linden) Regel

= Zamia roezlii =

Species of cycad

Zamia roezlii (chigua) is a species of cycad, a palm-like pachycaulous plant in the family Zamiaceae. It is found in Colombia (Choco, Nariño, Valle del Cauca, and Amazonas departments) and the Pacific coast of Ecuador. It is named after the Czech botanist Benedikt Roezl. A single sperm cell from Zamia roezlii is about 0.4 mm in length and is visible to the unaided eye, being the world's largest plant sperm cell. It is propelled by 40,000 cilia. Drosophila bifurca, a species of fruit fly, has sperm that are 5.8 cm long, albeit mostly coiled tail. The tree is up to 7 m in height with fronds up to 3 m (10 ft) long bearing leaflets up to 30–50 centimetres (12–20 in) long and 12–15 cm (4.7–5.9 in) wide.
