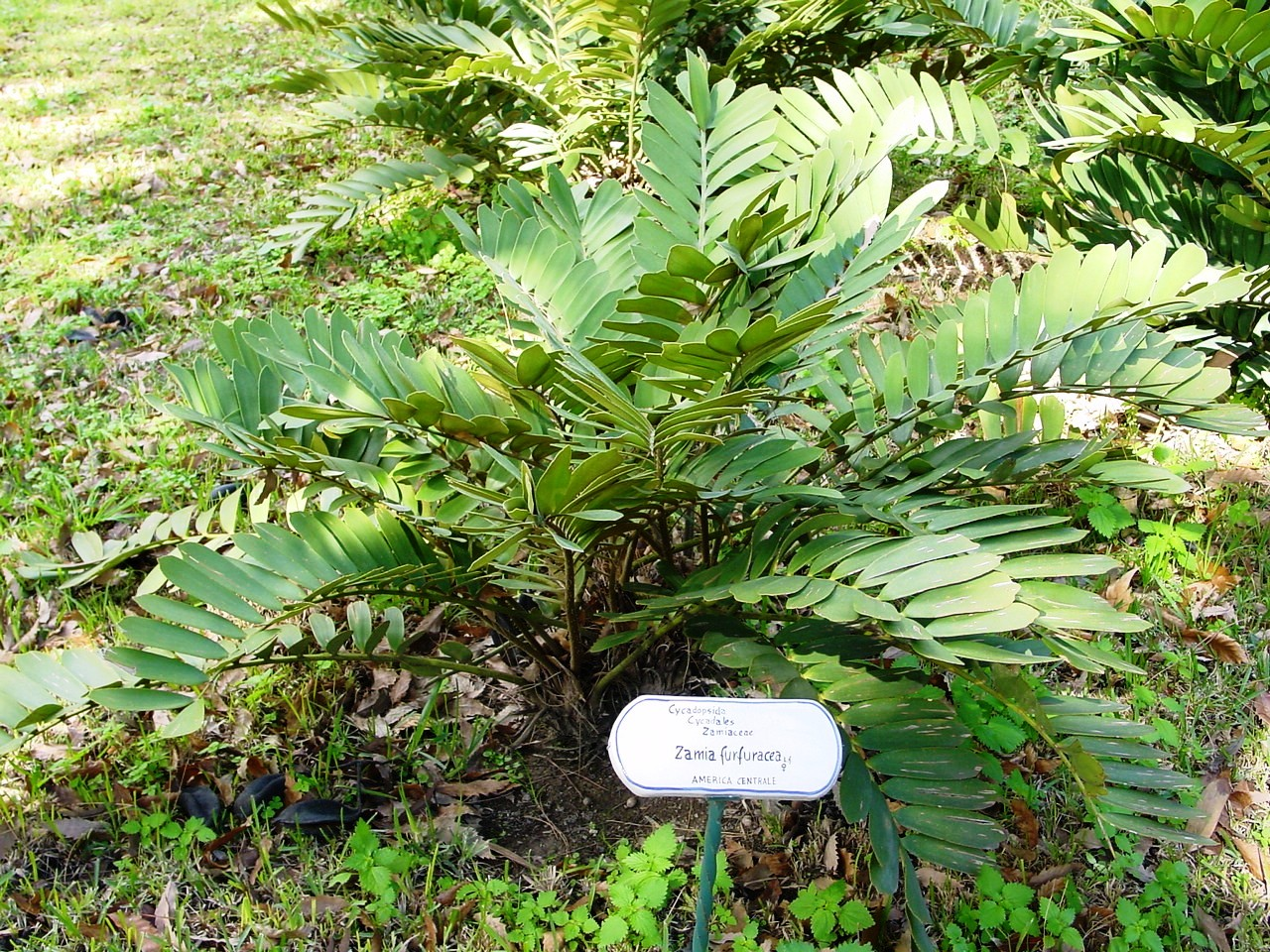

Conservation status
- Endangered (IUCN 3.1)

Scientific classification
- Kingdom: Plantae
- Clade: Embryophytes
- Clade: Tracheophytes
- Clade: Spermatophytes
- Clade: Gymnospermae
- Division: Cycadophyta
- Class: Cycadopsida
- Order: Cycadales
- Family: Zamiaceae
- Genus: Zamia
- Species: Z. furfuracea

Binomial name
- Zamia furfuracea L.f.

Synonyms
- Palmifolium furfuraceum Kuntze

= Zamia furfuracea =

Species of cycad

Zamia furfuracea is a species of cycad endemic to southeastern Veracruz state in eastern Mexico.

== Names ==
Although not a palm tree (Arecaceae), its growth habit is superficially similar to a palm; therefore it is commonly known as cardboard palm. However, more correct would be cardboard cycad since it reflects the actually taxonomic classification of this species. Other names include cardboard plant, cardboard sago, Jamaican sago, and Mexican cycad. The plant's binomial name comes from the Latin zamia, for "pine nut", and furfuracea, meaning "mealy" or "scurfy".

== Description ==
The plant has a short, sometimes subterranean trunk up to 20 cm broad and high, usually marked with scars from old leaf bases. It grows very slowly when young, but its growth accelerates after the trunk matures. Including the leaves, the whole plant typically grows to 1.3 m tall with a width of about 2 m.

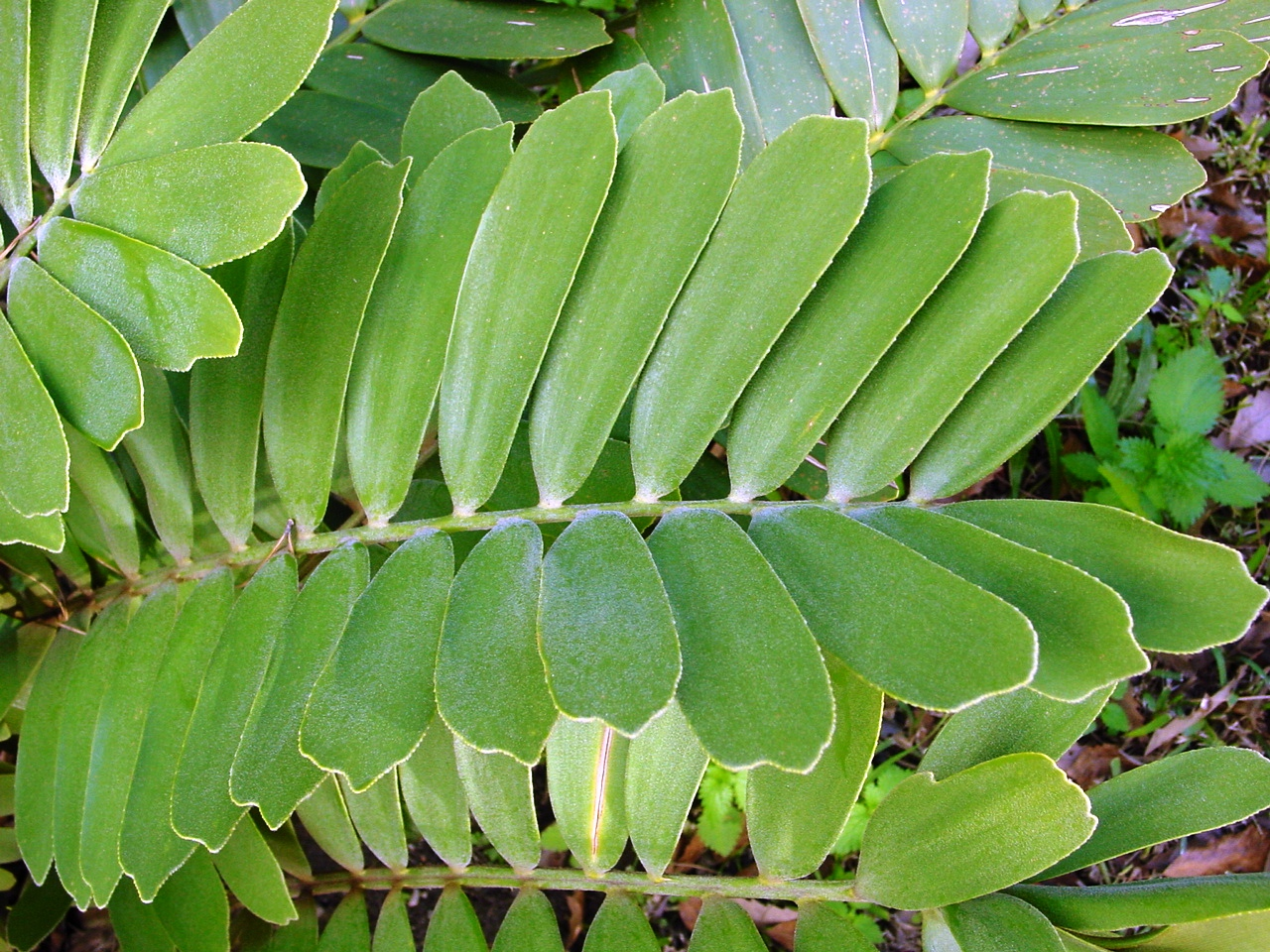
Leaflets

The leaves radiate from the center of the trunk; each leaf is 50–150 cm long with a petiole 15–30 cm long, and 6-12 pairs of extremely stiff, pubescent (fuzzy) green leaflets. These leaflets grow 8–20 cm long and 3–5 cm wide. Occasionally, the leaflets are toothed toward the tips. The circular crowns of leaves resemble fern or palm fronds. They are erect in full sun, horizontal in shade.

== Toxicity ==
All parts of the plant contain Cycasin and an unknown nervous system toxin which are poisonous to animals, including humans. The seeds are poisonous enough to kill small mammals such as dogs and cats, and cause liver and kidney failure, as well as eventual paralysis in humans. Dehydration sets in very quickly. No treatment for the poisoning is currently known.

== Reproduction ==
This plant produces a rusty-brown cone in the center of the female plant. It's a dioecious species, meaning that the egg-shaped female (seed-producing) cones and smaller male (pollen-producing) cone clusters are produced on separate plants. Pollination is done by certain insects, namely the cycad weevil Rhopalotria mollis.

== Conservation ==
Cardboard cycads can only be reproduced by the fleshy, brightly crimson-colored seeds produced by the female plants. The germination process is very slow and difficult to achieve in cultivation; as a result, many plants sold for horticultural use are illegally collected in the wild, leading to the species being classified as Endangered.

== Cultivation ==
This plant is easy to care for and grows best in moist, well-drained soil. They do well in full sun or shade, but not in constant deep shade. They are fairly salt- and drought-tolerant but should be protected from extreme cold. They should occasionally be fed with palm food. After Cycas revoluta, this is probably the most popular cycad species in cultivation. In temperate regions, it is commonly grown as a houseplant and, in subtropical areas, as a container or bedding plant outdoors.

== Sources ==
- Nicolalde-Morejón, Fernando; Vovides, Andrew P.; Stevenson, Dennis W. (9 December 2009). "Taxonomic revision of Zamia in Mega-Mexico". Brittonia. 61 (4): 301–335. doi:10.1007/s12228-009-9077-9. ISSN 0007-196X.
