= Zamia ipetiensis =

Conservation status
- Endangered (IUCN 3.1)

Scientific classification
- Kingdom: Plantae
- Clade: Embryophytes
- Clade: Tracheophytes
- Clade: Spermatophytes
- Clade: Gymnospermae
- Division: Cycadophyta
- Class: Cycadopsida
- Order: Cycadales
- Family: Zamiaceae
- Genus: Zamia
- Species: Z. ipetiensis

Binomial name
- Zamia ipetiensis D.W.Stev.

Species of cycad

Zamia ipetiensis is a species of plant in the family Zamiaceae. It is endemic to Panama, where it is found near the town of Ipetí, Kuna de Madugandí. It is threatened by habitat loss. Only two wild subpopulations remain.
