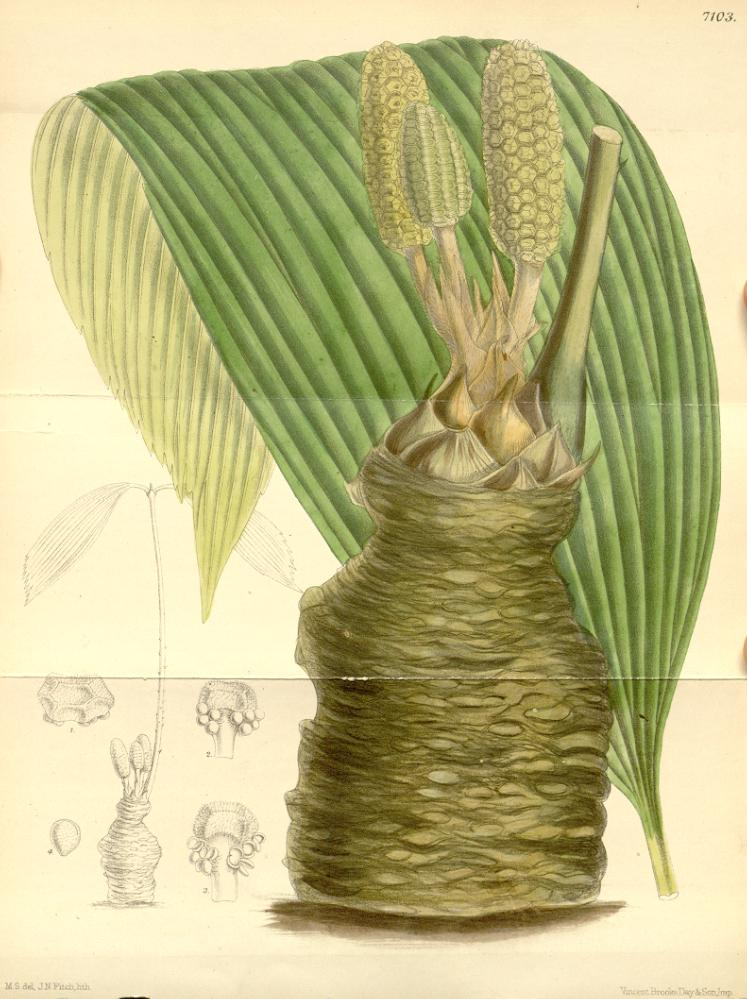
- Zamia wallisii, illustration

Conservation status
- Critically Endangered (IUCN 3.1)

Scientific classification
- Kingdom: Plantae
- Clade: Tracheophytes
- Clade: Gymnospermae
- Division: Cycadophyta
- Class: Cycadopsida
- Order: Cycadales
- Family: Zamiaceae
- Genus: Zamia
- Species: Z. wallisii

Binomial name
- Zamia wallisii Veitch ex A.Br.

= Zamia wallisii =

Species of cycad

Zamia wallisii is a species of plant in the family (Zamiaceae) that is commonly known as the chigua. It is endemic to Colombia.

== History ==
Zamia wallisii was described in 1875 by Alexander Braun from material collected by Gustav Wallis in Colombia, where it grows at 300–1000 m elevation. The species was collected once again in 1888 by Guillermo Kalbreyer and then not seen again for 100 years. Both the Wallis and Kalbreyer collections were lost and no type specimen was extant resulting in some doubt about the existence of the species until its rediscovery in the 1980s, by Ian Sutherland Turner. Its leaves have 2–18 leaflets, each of which are up to 60 cm (24 in) long and 30 cm (12 in) wide, the largest of any gymnosperm.

== Conservation ==
There is only one known population of this plant, comprising fewer than 50 individuals. It is located in habitat that is being consumed by deforestation. Plants are found near the town of Frontino, Antioquia Department, and also near Urrao, and in Las Orquideas National Park.
