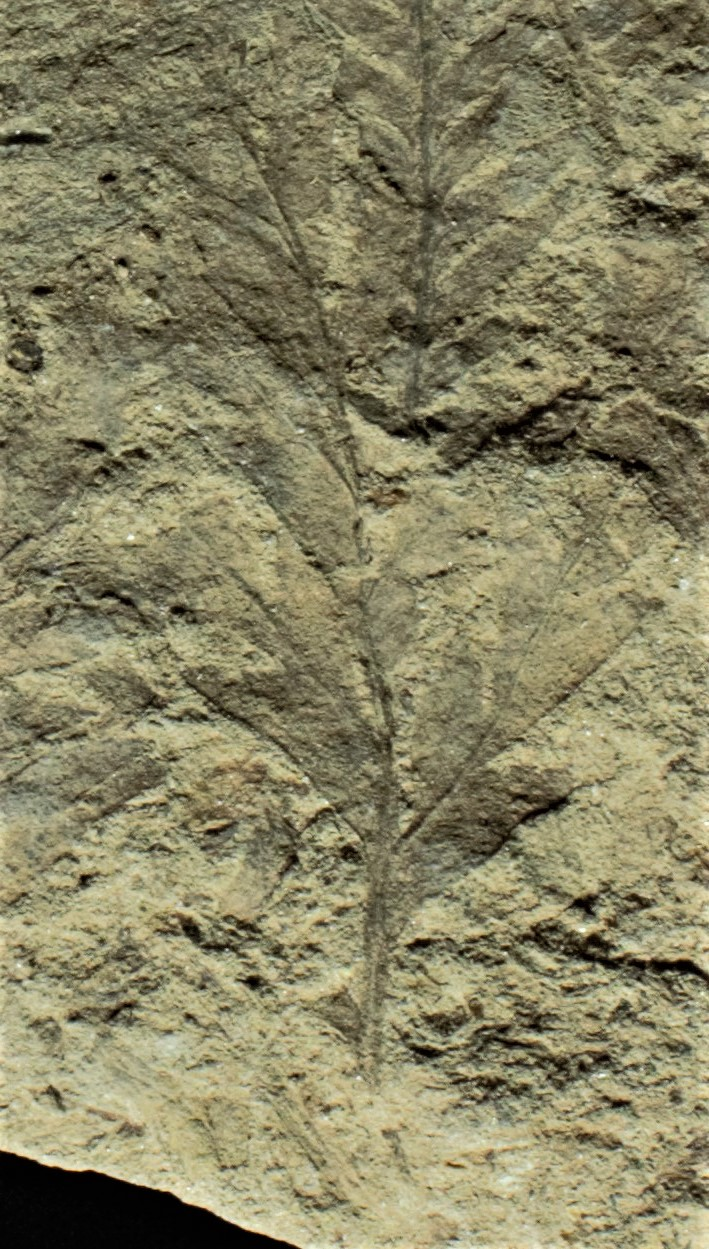

Scientific classification
- Kingdom: Plantae
- (unranked): Angiosperms
- Genus: Mesodescolea S.Archang.

Species
- M. plicata (type species)

= Mesodescolea =

Mesodescolea Temporal range: Early Cretaceous

Prehistoric plant

Mesodescolea is a genus of fossil foliage with uncertain affinities from the Early Cretaceous of Argentina and Antarctica. It includes only one species, Mesodescolea plicata.

== Taxonomy ==
The genus was first erected by Sergio Archangelsky based on material from the Aptian of the Anfiteatro de Ticó formation. The name of the genus is dedicated to the naturalist Horacio Descole. Although it was originally compared to cycadalean genera such as Ctenis and Stangeria, its affinities were originally considered uncertain. Later reinvestigations and emendations cemented the view that Mesodescolea was a member of the Cycadales family Stangeriaceae. Other authors have proposed that the genus represents a member of the angiosperms with affinities with the ANA grade or Chloranthaceae.

== Description ==
The genus includes leaves with highly lobed-dissected margins. The venation is hierarchical, with the tertiary veins forming an irregular reticulum. Chloranthoid teeth are present in the margins. The cuticle shows laterocytic stomata, and is characterized by striae and perforated idioblasts.

== Paleoecology ==
Leaves of Mesodescolea are locally abundant in the deposits of the Anfiteatro de Ticó formation. They are found in association with Ruflorinia/Ktalenia and the conifer Brachyphyllum. The depositional environment is characterized by river deposits, and the fossils show little evidence of transport.
