= Ceratozamia morettii =

Conservation status
- Endangered (IUCN 3.1)
- CITES Appendix I

Scientific classification
- Kingdom: Plantae
- Clade: Tracheophytes
- Clade: Gymnospermae
- Division: Cycadophyta
- Class: Cycadopsida
- Order: Cycadales
- Family: Zamiaceae
- Genus: Ceratozamia
- Species: C. morettii

Binomial name
- Ceratozamia morettii Vázq.Torres & Vovides

Species of cycad

Ceratozamia morettii is a species of plant in the family Zamiaceae. It is endemic to Mexico, where it is limited to the state of Veracruz north of Jalapa. It grows on steep clay and basalt cliffs in cloud forest habitat.

This cycad is palm-like in appearance but with a trunk no more than 30 centimeters long, often shorter, and quite variable in shape. It has up to 10 leaves which are up to 140 centimeters long by 65 wide and are made up of 12 to 25 pairs of leaflets.

Other native plants in this species' nearly inaccessible cloud forest habitat include Alnus jorullensis, Clethra mexicana, Dendropanax arboreus, Dicksonia gigantea, Ilex discolor, Liquidambar macrophylla, Magnolia schiedeana, Marattia laxa, Oreopanax capitatus, Ostrya virginiana, and Podocarpus guatemalensis.
