= Ceratozamia whitelockiana =

Conservation status
- Endangered (IUCN 3.1)
- CITES Appendix I

Scientific classification
- Kingdom: Plantae
- Clade: Tracheophytes
- Clade: Gymnospermae
- Division: Cycadophyta
- Class: Cycadopsida
- Order: Cycadales
- Family: Zamiaceae
- Genus: Ceratozamia
- Species: C. whitelockiana

Binomial name
- Ceratozamia whitelockiana J.Chemnick & T.J.Greg.

Species of cycad

Ceratozamia whitelockiana is a species of plant in the family Zamiaceae. It is endemic to Mexico, where it is known only from Metates and Chiapan in Oaxaca state. Only two subpopulations have been found, with a total population of about 2200 individuals. The habitat is threatened by conversion to plantations using slash-and-burn techniques.

This cycad has a cylindrical trunk about 20 to 30 centimeters long. The leaves are up to 2.5 meters in length and have 30 to 40 pairs of leaflets. The plant was named for cycad expert Loran Whitelock.
