= Ceratozamia fuscoviridis =

Conservation status
- Critically Endangered (IUCN 3.1)
- CITES Appendix I

Scientific classification
- Kingdom: Plantae
- Clade: Embryophytes
- Clade: Tracheophytes
- Clade: Spermatophytes
- Clade: Gymnosperms
- Division: Cycadophyta
- Class: Cycadopsida
- Order: Cycadales
- Family: Zamiaceae
- Genus: Ceratozamia
- Species: C. fuscoviridis

Binomial name
- Ceratozamia fuscoviridis (D.Moore) J.Shust.

Species of cycad

Ceratozamia fuscoviridis is a species of plant in the family Zamiaceae. It is endemic to Hidalgo state in Mexico. It is a Critically endangered species, threatened by habitat loss.
