= Ceratozamia euryphyllidia =

Conservation status
- Critically Endangered (IUCN 3.1)
- CITES Appendix I

Scientific classification
- Kingdom: Plantae
- Clade: Tracheophytes
- Clade: Gymnospermae
- Division: Cycadophyta
- Class: Cycadopsida
- Order: Cycadales
- Family: Zamiaceae
- Genus: Ceratozamia
- Species: C. euryphyllidia

Binomial name
- Ceratozamia euryphyllidia Vázq.Torres, Sabato & D.W.Stev.

Species of cycad

Ceratozamia euryphyllidia is a species of plant in the family Zamiaceae. It is found in Guatemala and in the Mexican state of Oaxaca and Veracruz (in the isthmus of Tehuantepec region). It is threatened by habitat loss.
