= Ceratozamia decumbens =

Conservation status
- CITES Appendix I (CITES)

Scientific classification
- Kingdom: Plantae
- Clade: Tracheophytes
- Clade: Gymnospermae
- Division: Cycadophyta
- Class: Cycadopsida
- Order: Cycadales
- Family: Zamiaceae
- Genus: Ceratozamia
- Species: C. decumbens

Binomial name
- Ceratozamia decumbens Vovides, Avendaño, Pérez-Farr. & Gonz.-Astorga

Species of cycad

Ceratozamia decumbens is a species of cycad in the family Zamiaceae.
