= Ceratozamia chimalapensis =

Conservation status
- CITES Appendix I (CITES)
- Critically Endangered (IUCN 3.1)

Scientific classification
- Kingdom: Plantae
- Clade: Tracheophytes
- Clade: Gymnospermae
- Division: Cycadophyta
- Class: Cycadopsida
- Order: Cycadales
- Family: Zamiaceae
- Genus: Ceratozamia
- Species: C. chimalapensis

Binomial name
- Ceratozamia chimalapensis Pérez-Farr. & Vovides

Species of cycad

Ceratozamia chimalapensis (also known as Ceratozamia mirandae) is a species of cycad in the family Zamiaceae. It is found in the extreme western portion of the Sierra Madre de Chiapas massif of Mexico (also known as the Sierra Atravesada).

== Appearance ==
The plant is distinguished by its stout, woody trunk and palmlike leaves, reaching heights of up to 1 meter and a trunk radius of up to 17.8 to 33.1 centimeters. Older plants can have two branches. Its dark green fronds grow in a spiral pattern from the top of the trunk. The plant also features conical reproductive structures.

The pollen cones are held upright and light green to olive green when first emerging and light yellow when ready to produce pollen. The seed cones are shaped like a barrel or cylinder. When first emerging they are upright and blue-green and they droop and become dark brown as the seeds ripen.

The seeds are ovate in shape, with an immature sarcotesta that is white, transitioning to light yellow or light cream-beige upon maturity. The sclerotesta is smooth and features 7 to 10 visible rays radiating from the ovule. Each seed measures approximately 2.5 to 2.9 cm in length and 1.5 to 1.7 cm in diameter.

== Distribution ==
As the name suggests, C. chimalapensis is native to Oaxaca, Mexico. It is primarily concentrated within the cloud forests that cover the slopes of the Chimalapas mountains, characterized by persistent cloud cover and high humidity levels. This species is typically found at elevations between 800 and 1,500 meters above sea level.
