= Ceratozamia zoquorum =

Conservation status
- CITES Appendix I

Scientific classification
- Kingdom: Plantae
- Clade: Embryophytes
- Clade: Tracheophytes
- Clade: Spermatophytes
- Clade: Gymnospermae
- Division: Cycadophyta
- Class: Cycadopsida
- Order: Cycadales
- Family: Zamiaceae
- Genus: Ceratozamia
- Species: C. zoquorum

Binomial name
- Ceratozamia zoquorum Pérez-Farr., Vovides, Iglesias

Species of cycad

Ceratozamia zoquorum is a species of cycad in the family Zamiaceae endemic to northwestern Chiapas, Mexico.
