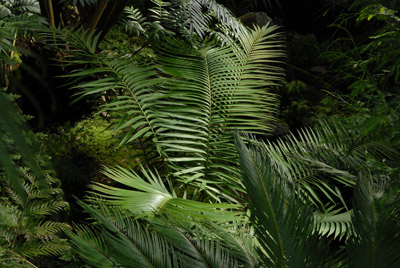

Conservation status
- Vulnerable (IUCN 3.1)
- CITES Appendix I (CITES)

Scientific classification
- Kingdom: Plantae
- Clade: Tracheophytes
- Clade: Gymnospermae
- Division: Cycadophyta
- Class: Cycadopsida
- Order: Cycadales
- Family: Zamiaceae
- Genus: Ceratozamia
- Species: C. mexicana

Binomial name
- Ceratozamia mexicana Brongn.

= Ceratozamia mexicana =

Species of cycad

Ceratozamia mexicana is a species of plant in the family Zamiaceae.

It is endemic to Hidalgo, Puebla, Querétaro, San Luis Potosí, and Veracruz states in Mexico. Its natural habitats are subtropical or tropical moist lowland forests and subtropical or tropical moist montane forests. It is threatened by habitat loss.

== Gallery ==
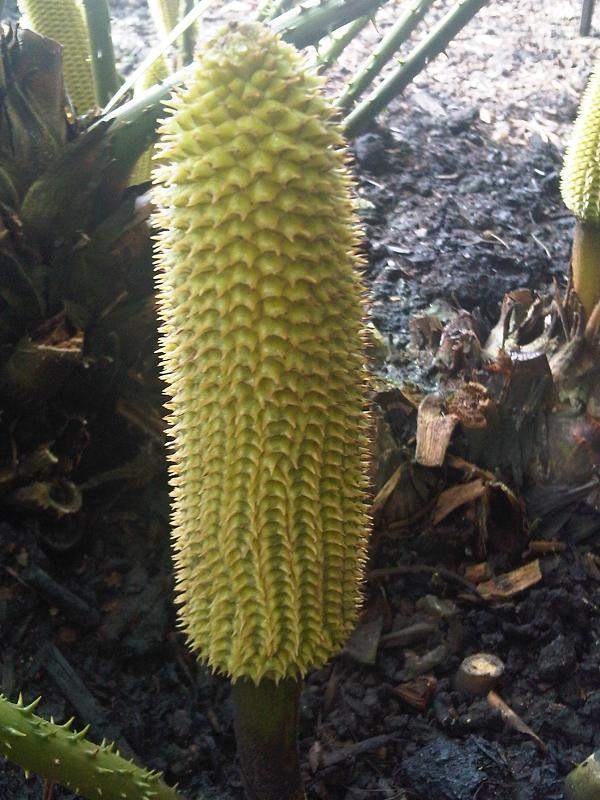
The pollen cone of the Ceratozamia mexicana Kew Gardens
