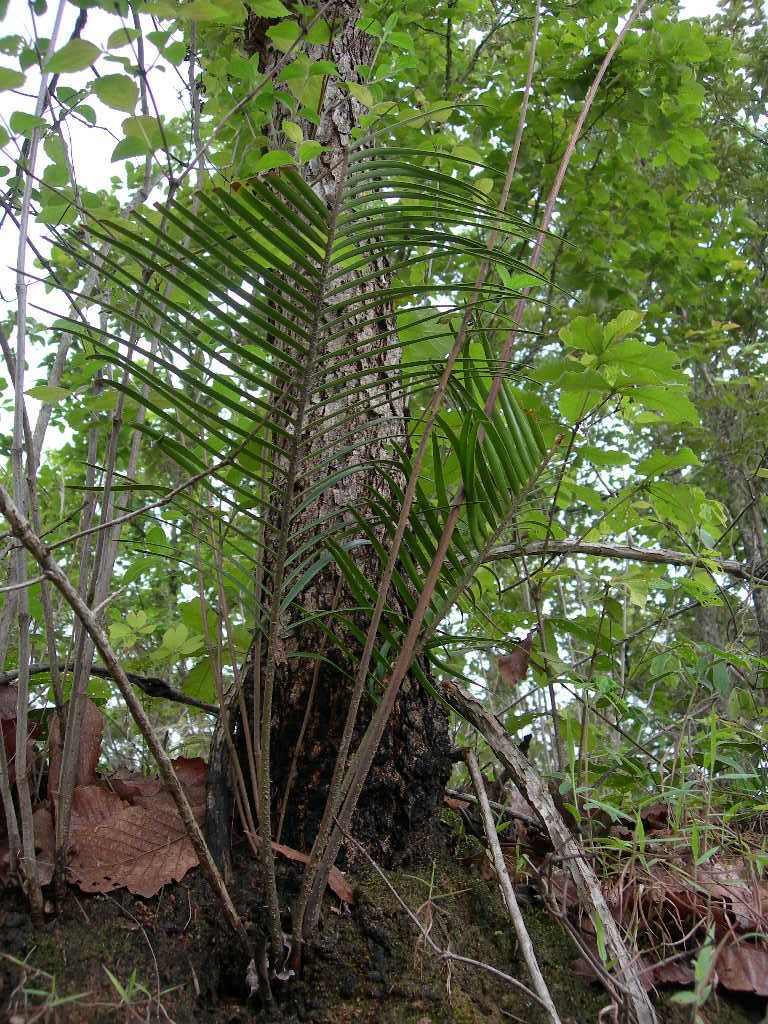

Conservation status
- Endangered (IUCN 3.1)
- CITES Appendix I (CITES)

Scientific classification
- Kingdom: Plantae
- Clade: Tracheophytes
- Clade: Gymnospermae
- Division: Cycadophyta
- Class: Cycadopsida
- Order: Cycadales
- Family: Zamiaceae
- Genus: Ceratozamia
- Species: C. mirandae

Binomial name
- Ceratozamia mirandae Vovides, Pérez-Farr., Iglesias

= Ceratozamia mirandae =

Species of cycad

Ceratozamia mirandae is a species of cycad in the family Zamiaceae endemic to Chiapas and Oaxaca, Mexico. It is found on the slopes of the Sierra Madre de Chiapas and Sierra de Niltepec, near La Tigria (La Tigrilla).
