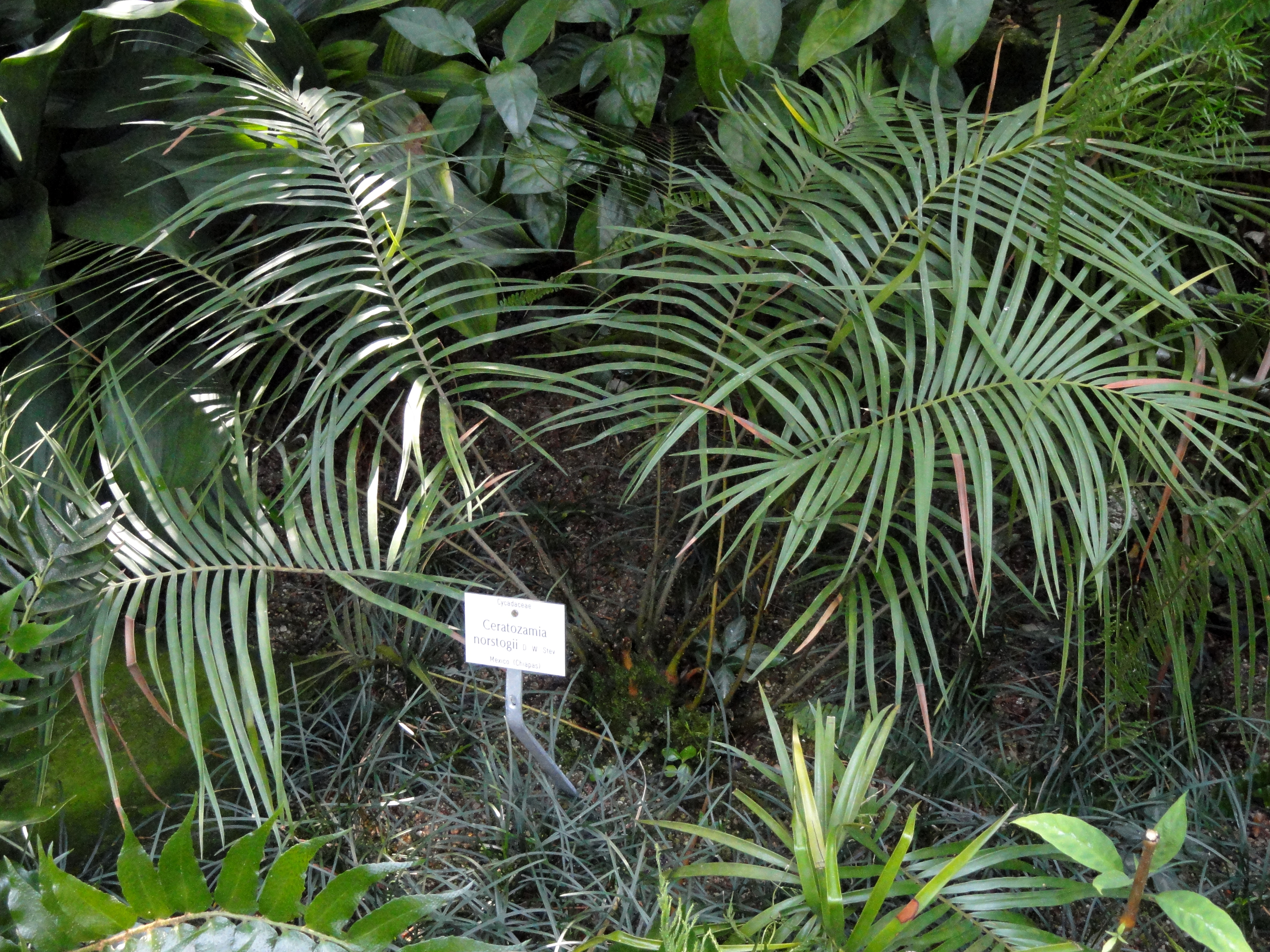
- Ceratozamia norstogii specimen in the Botanischer Garten München-Nymphenburg, Munich, Germany.

Conservation status
- Endangered (IUCN 3.1)
- CITES Appendix I

Scientific classification
- Kingdom: Plantae
- Clade: Tracheophytes
- Clade: Gymnospermae
- Division: Cycadophyta
- Class: Cycadopsida
- Order: Cycadales
- Family: Zamiaceae
- Genus: Ceratozamia
- Species: C. norstogii

Binomial name
- Ceratozamia norstogii D.W.Stev.

= Ceratozamia norstogii =

Species of cycad

Ceratozamia norstogii is a species of plant in the family Zamiaceae. It is endemic to the Sierra Madre de Chiapas, in Chiapas and Oaxaca states of southwestern Mexico. It is an Endangered species, threatened by habitat loss.
