= Ceratozamia santillanii =

Conservation status
- CITES Appendix I

Scientific classification
- Kingdom: Plantae
- Clade: Tracheophytes
- Clade: Gymnospermae
- Division: Cycadophyta
- Class: Cycadopsida
- Order: Cycadales
- Family: Zamiaceae
- Genus: Ceratozamia
- Species: C. santillanii

Binomial name
- Ceratozamia santillanii Pérez-Farrera & Vovides

Species of cycad

Ceratozamia santillanii is a species of cycad in the family Zamiaceae.

== Mutualism ==
The beetle Pharaxonotha perezi is in an obligatory mutualistic relationship with Ceratozamia santillani, living and breeding in male cones and consuming pollen and cone tissues while serving as a pollinating vector by transferring pollen to female cones.
