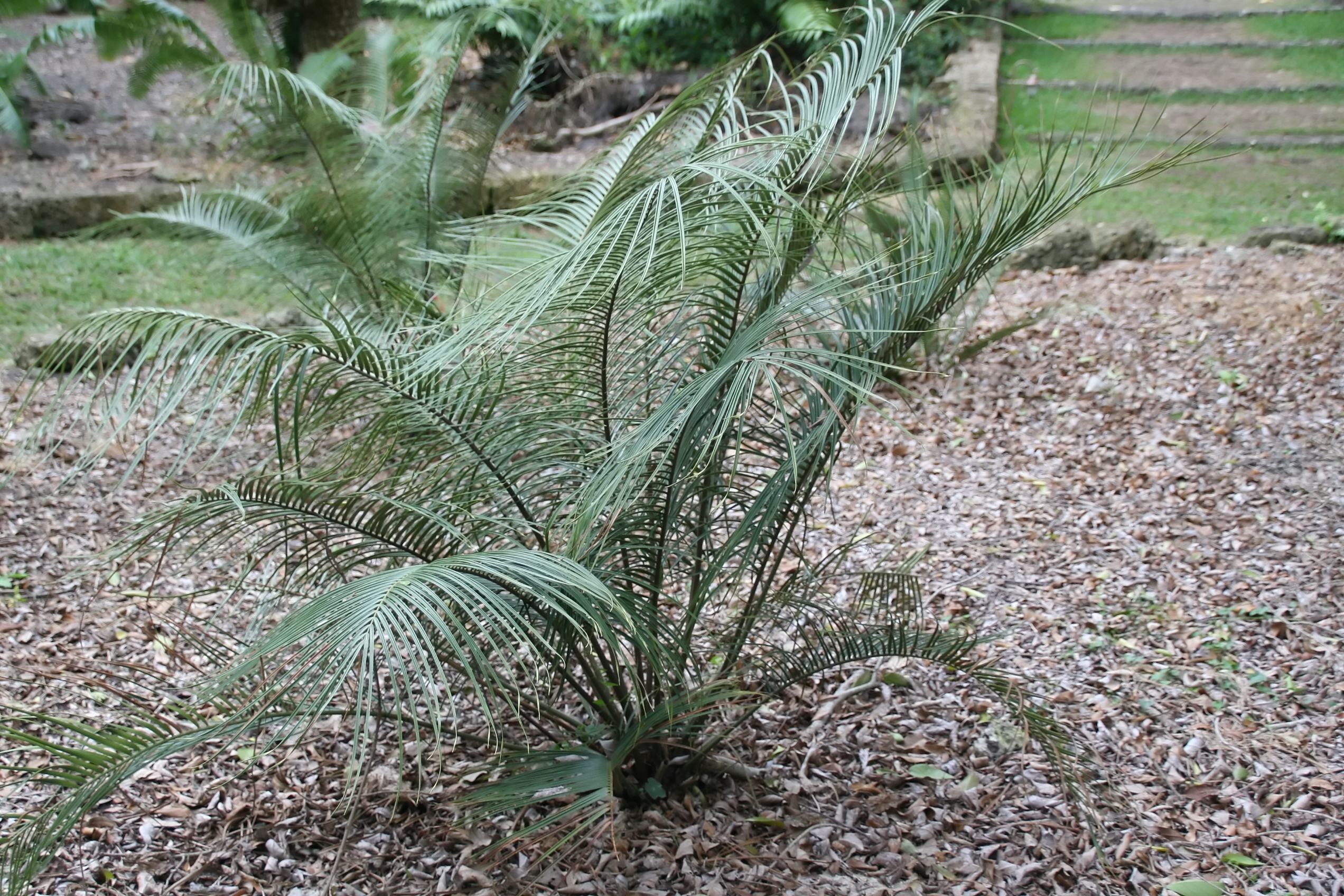
- Ceratozamia kuesteriana at Lotusland in Montecito, California.

Conservation status
- Critically Endangered (IUCN 3.1)
- CITES Appendix I

Scientific classification
- Kingdom: Plantae
- Clade: Tracheophytes
- Clade: Gymnospermae
- Division: Cycadophyta
- Class: Cycadopsida
- Order: Cycadales
- Family: Zamiaceae
- Genus: Ceratozamia
- Species: C. kuesteriana

Binomial name
- Ceratozamia kuesteriana Regel

= Ceratozamia kuesteriana =

Species of cycad

Ceratozamia kuesteriana is a species of cycad in the family Zamiaceae that is endemic to the Sierra Madre Oriental of Mexico.

It is restricted to steep slopes in pine-oak dominated cloud forests between Gómez Farías and Tula in southern Tamaulipas.

Ceratozamia kuesteriana is threatened by habitat loss and collecting. The total wild population is believed to number no more than 300 plants.
