= Eostangeria =

Eostangeria Temporal range: Paleocene-Middle Miocene

Scientific classification
- Kingdom: Plantae
- Clade: Tracheophytes
- Clade: Gymnosperms
- Division: Cycadophyta
- Class: Cycadopsida
- Order: Cycadales
- Family: Zamiaceae
- Subfamily: †Eostangerioideae; Kvaček, Palamarev & Uzunova, 2002
- Genus: †Eostangeria; Barthel, 1976

Type species
- E. saxonica Barthel, 1976

Other species
- E. pseudopteris Kvaček & Manchester, 1999; E. ruzinciniana (Palamarev, Petkova, & Uzunova) Palamarev & Usunova, 1992

Extinct genus of cycads

Eostangeria is a morphogenus of fossil foliage belonging to the Cycadales.

== Taxonomy ==
Some leaflets of Eostangeria had previously described as ferns such as Angiopteris. As late as 1999 there was uncertainty regarding the familial affinities of the genus, with suggested relationship to with either Stangeria or the Colombian Zamia restrepoi. However, with the redescription of E. ruzinciniana by Uzunova, Palamarev, and Kvacek (2002) the genus was placed in the cycad family Zamiaceae as the type genus of the monotypic subfamily Eostangerioideae.

== Distribution ==
Eostangeria was first described based on material E. saxonica from the Eocene of the Geisel valley,. Subsequently E. ruzinciniana was described from the Middle Miocene Krivodol Formation of Bulgaria, while E. pseudopteris was detailed from Paleocene through Eocene sediments in Western North America including Wyoming and Oregon.

== Description ==
Leaflets of Eostangeria have a notable midrib from which parallel veins diverge fusing only rarely in the margin of the leaflet. Dispersed leaflets are often retrieved, suggesting the presence of an abscission layer at the base. Cuticles have isodiametrical to elongated cells, with dark-staining and light-staining pavement cells and sunken stomata. If the cuticle is not preserved, leaflets of Eostangeria can be confused with fern leaflets of the genus Allantodiopsis.
