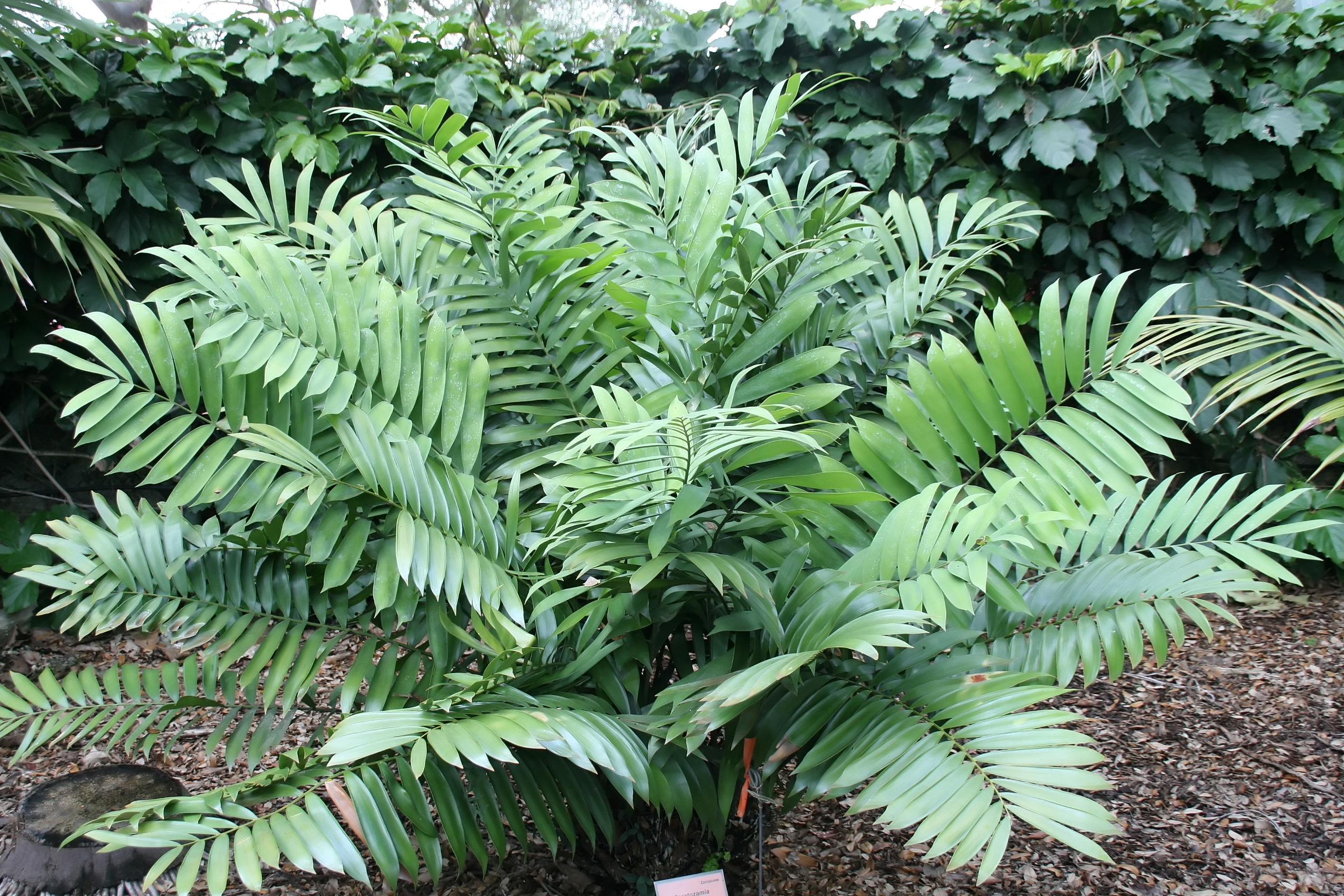

Conservation status
- Critically Endangered (IUCN 3.1)
- CITES Appendix I

Scientific classification
- Kingdom: Plantae
- Clade: Tracheophytes
- Clade: Gymnospermae
- Division: Cycadophyta
- Class: Cycadopsida
- Order: Cycadales
- Family: Zamiaceae
- Genus: Ceratozamia
- Species: C. miqueliana

Binomial name
- Ceratozamia miqueliana H.Wendl.

= Ceratozamia miqueliana =

Species of cycad

Ceratozamia miqueliana is a species of plant in the family Zamiaceae. It is endemic to Chiapas and Veracruz, Mexico. It is currently found in Coatzacoalcos and Santiago Tuxtla. Its natural habitat is subtropical or tropical moist lowland forests. It is threatened by habitat loss.
