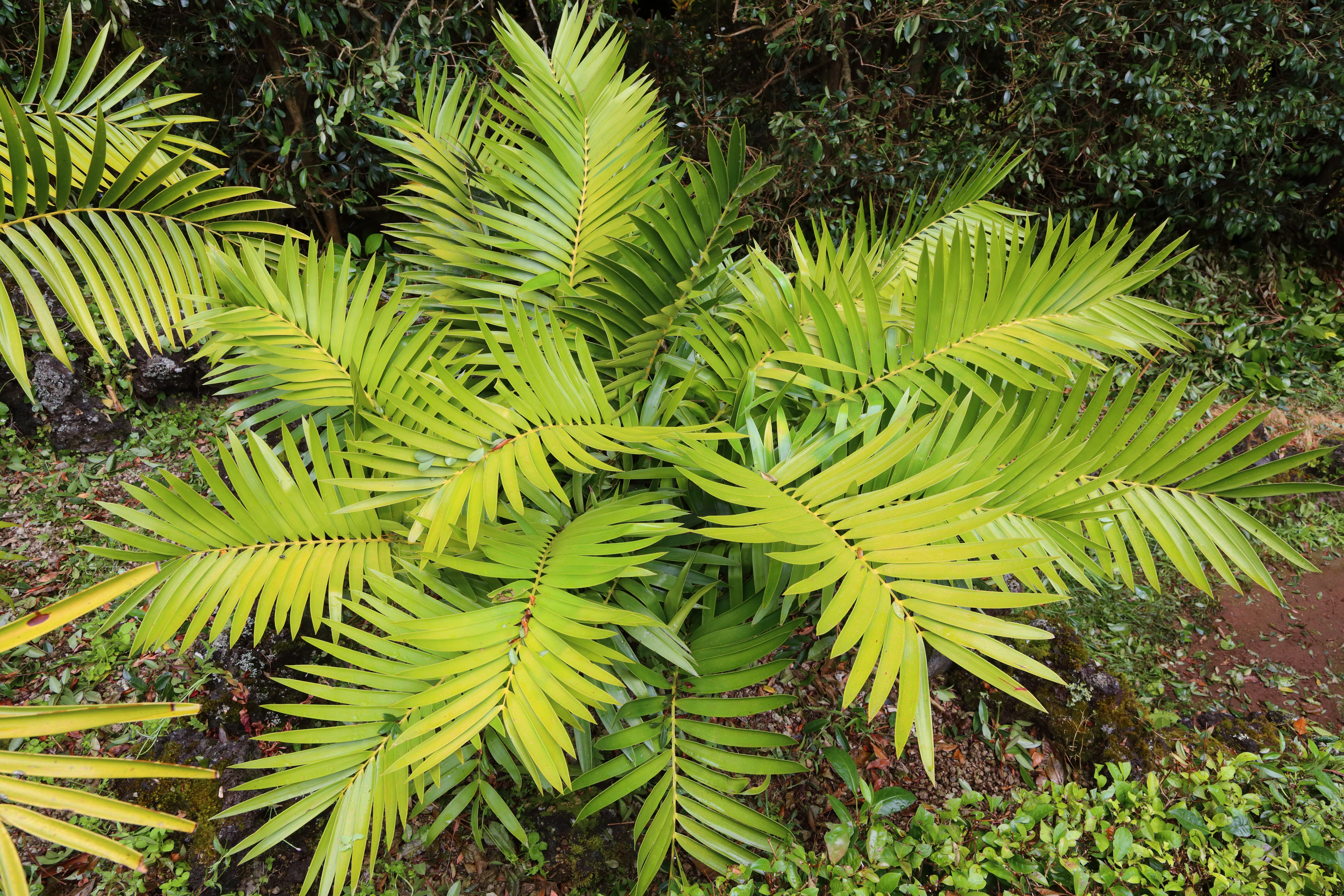

Conservation status
- Endangered (IUCN 3.1)
- CITES Appendix I

Scientific classification
- Kingdom: Plantae
- Clade: Tracheophytes
- Clade: Gymnospermae
- Division: Cycadophyta
- Class: Cycadopsida
- Order: Cycadales
- Family: Zamiaceae
- Genus: Ceratozamia
- Species: C. robusta

Binomial name
- Ceratozamia robusta Miq.

= Ceratozamia robusta =

Species of cycad

Ceratozamia robusta is a species of plant in the family Zamiaceae. It is found in Belize, Guatemala, and Mexico (in Chiapas, Oaxaca, and Veracruz). Its natural habitat is subtropical or tropical moist lowland forests. It is threatened by habitat loss.
