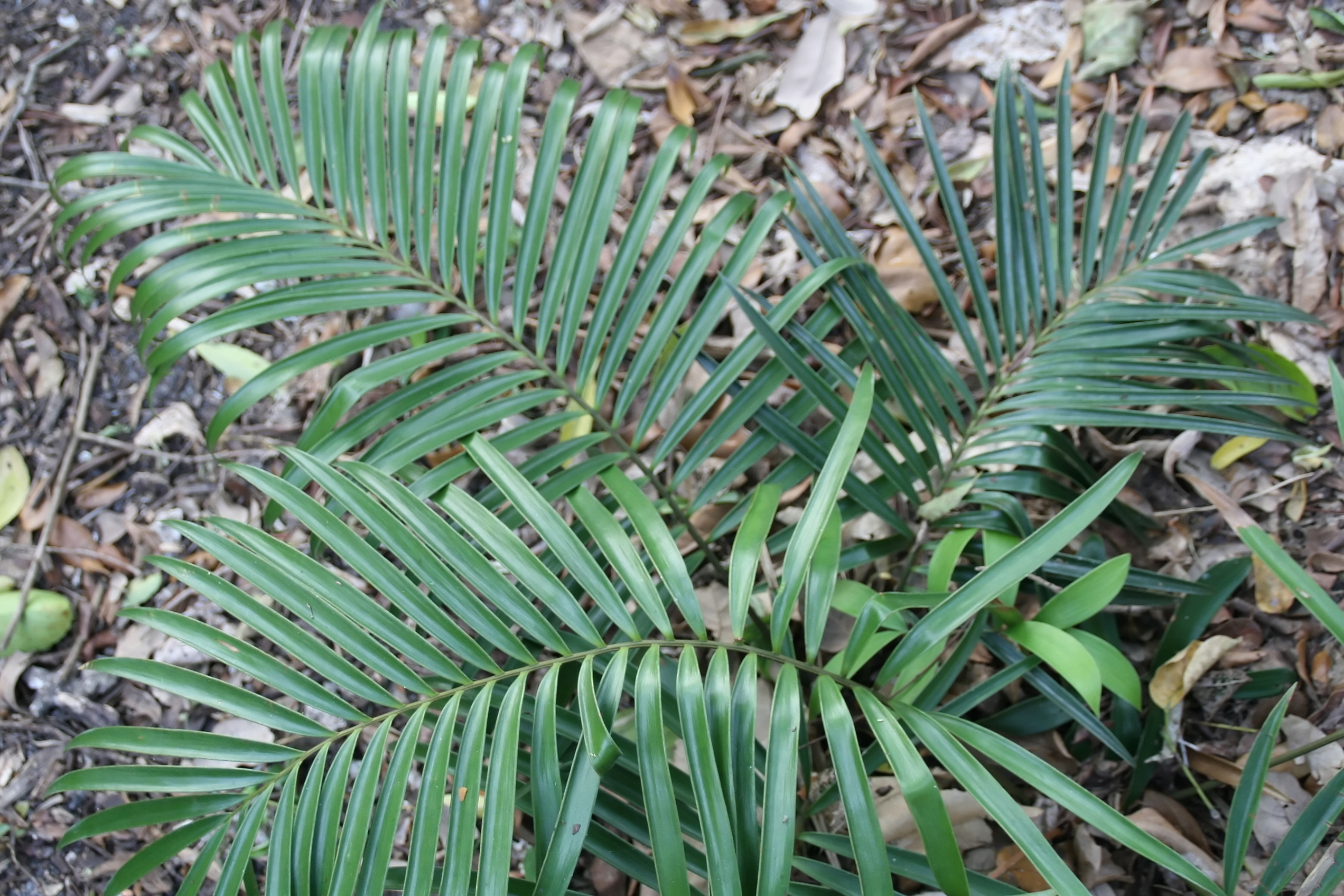

Conservation status
- Endangered (IUCN 3.1)
- CITES Appendix I

Scientific classification
- Kingdom: Plantae
- Clade: Tracheophytes
- Clade: Gymnospermae
- Division: Cycadophyta
- Class: Cycadopsida
- Order: Cycadales
- Family: Zamiaceae
- Genus: Ceratozamia
- Species: C. sabatoi

Binomial name
- Ceratozamia sabatoi Vovides, Vázq.Torres, Schutzman & Iglesias

= Ceratozamia sabatoi =

Species of cycad

Ceratozamia sabatoi is a species of plant in the family Zamiaceae. It is endemic to Mexico, where it occurs in the states of Hidalgo and Querétaro. It is known from only two localities, one of which is degraded by agriculture and grazing.

This cycad is generally palm-like in appearance. The trunk is rounded, becoming more cylindrical with age to a maximum length of 25 centimeters. It bears 2 to 6 prickly leaves each up to 80 centimeters long and made up of 12 to 136 leaflets.

This plant grows in pine-oak forest alongside Arbutus xalapensis, Buddleja cordata, Carya ovata, Litsea glaucescens, Meliosma alba, and Prunus serotina.
