= Ceratozamia mixeorum =

Conservation status
- Endangered (IUCN 3.1)
- CITES Appendix I

Scientific classification
- Kingdom: Plantae
- Clade: Tracheophytes
- Clade: Gymnospermae
- Division: Cycadophyta
- Class: Cycadopsida
- Order: Cycadales
- Family: Zamiaceae
- Genus: Ceratozamia
- Species: C. mixeorum

Binomial name
- Ceratozamia mixeorum J.Chemnick, T.J.Greg. & Salas-Morales

Species of cycad

Ceratozamia mixeorum is a species of plant in the family Zamiaceae. It is endemic to the Sierra Mixe of Oaxaca state in southern Mexico. Its natural habitat is subtropical or tropical moist montane forests.
