= Ceratozamia becerrae =

Conservation status
- Endangered (IUCN 3.1)
- CITES Appendix I

Scientific classification
- Kingdom: Plantae
- Clade: Tracheophytes
- Clade: Gymnospermae
- Division: Cycadophyta
- Class: Cycadopsida
- Order: Cycadales
- Family: Zamiaceae
- Genus: Ceratozamia
- Species: C. becerrae

Binomial name
- Ceratozamia becerrae Pérez-Farrera

Species of cycad

Ceratozamia becerrae is a species of plant in the family Zamiaceae.

It is endemic to Mexico, where it is known only from the states of Chiapas and Tabasco. There are only two known populations. The plants grow in rainforest habitat on karst substrates.

This species was described to science in 2004.
