= Ceratozamia vovidesii =

Conservation status
- CITES Appendix I (CITES)

Scientific classification
- Kingdom: Plantae
- Clade: Tracheophytes
- Clade: Gymnospermae
- Division: Cycadophyta
- Class: Cycadopsida
- Order: Cycadales
- Family: Zamiaceae
- Genus: Ceratozamia
- Species: C. vovidesii

Binomial name
- Ceratozamia vovidesii Pérez-Farr. & Iglesias

Species of cycad

Ceratozamia vovidesii is a species of cycad in the family Zamiaceae endemic to the Sierra Madre de Chiapas of Mexico.
