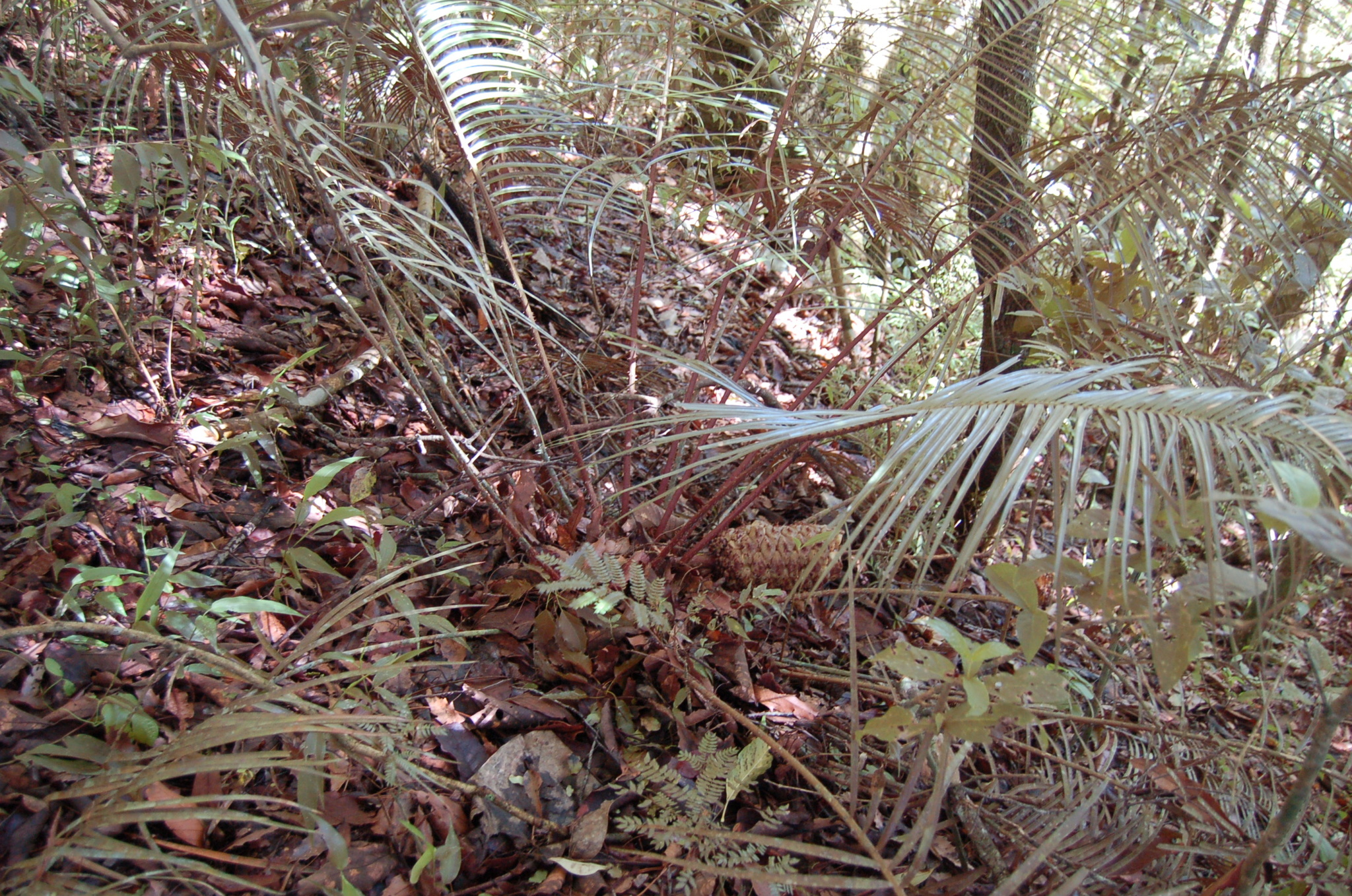

Conservation status
- Endangered (IUCN 3.1)
- CITES Appendix I

Scientific classification
- Kingdom: Plantae
- Clade: Tracheophytes
- Clade: Gymnospermae
- Division: Cycadophyta
- Class: Cycadopsida
- Order: Cycadales
- Family: Zamiaceae
- Genus: Ceratozamia
- Species: C. matudae

Binomial name
- Ceratozamia matudae Lundell

= Ceratozamia matudae =

Species of cycad

Ceratozamia matudae is a species of plant in the family Zamiaceae. It is native to Mexico, where it occurs in the states of Chiapas and Oaxaca, and its distribution extends into western Guatemala. Though some populations are in protected areas, the species is still affected by habitat loss as forest is cleared for plantations.
