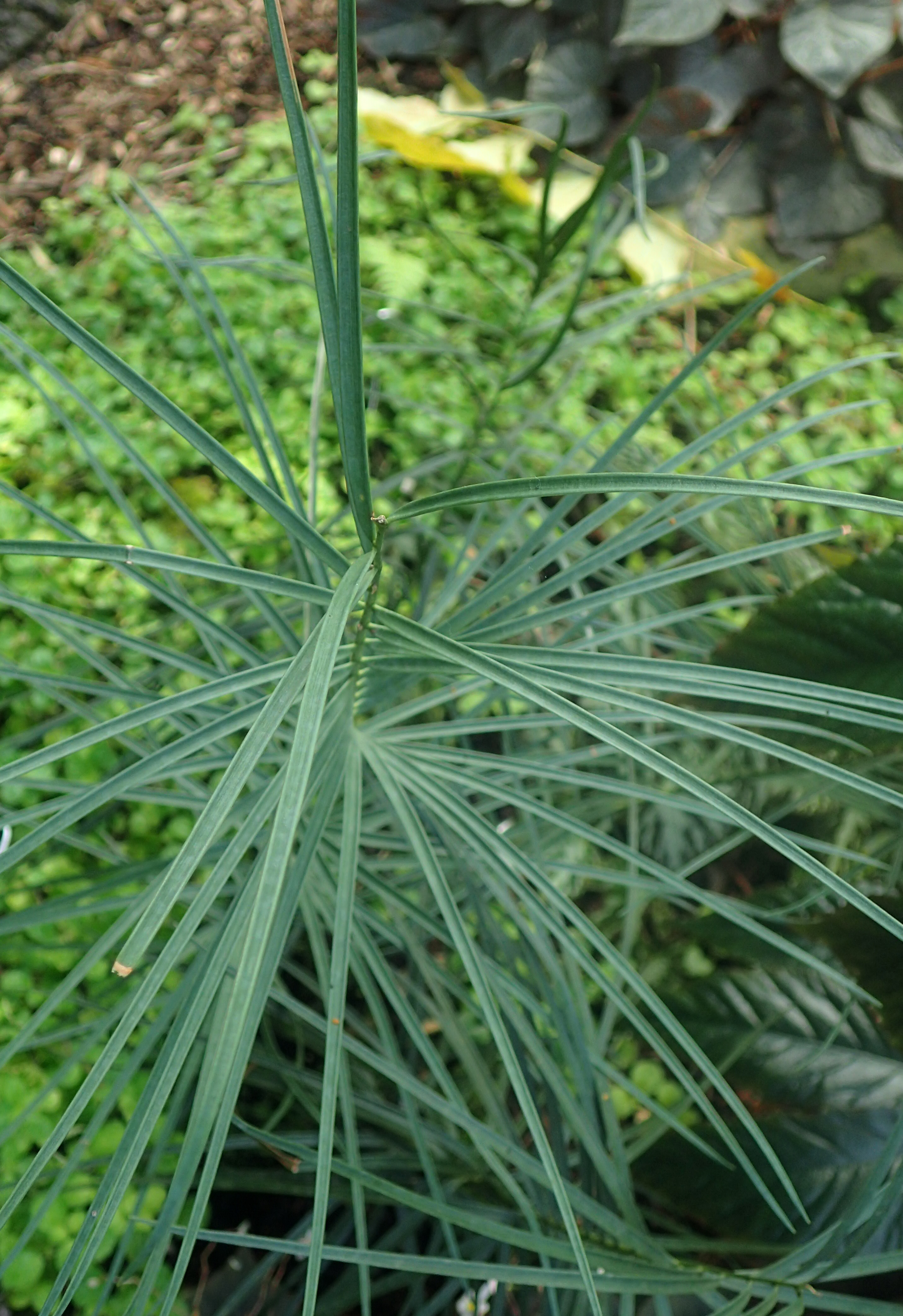

Conservation status
- Critically Endangered (IUCN 3.1)
- CITES Appendix I

Scientific classification
- Kingdom: Plantae
- Clade: Tracheophytes
- Clade: Gymnospermae
- Division: Cycadophyta
- Class: Cycadopsida
- Order: Cycadales
- Family: Zamiaceae
- Genus: Ceratozamia
- Species: C. zaragozae

Binomial name
- Ceratozamia zaragozae Medellin-Leal

= Ceratozamia zaragozae =

Species of cycad

Ceratozamia zaragozae is a species of plant in the family Zamiaceae. It is endemic to the Rio Verde in El Capulín, San Luis Potosí state in northeastern Mexico. It is a Critically endangered species, threatened by habitat loss. It is found southwest of the Rio Verde, in Capulin district.
