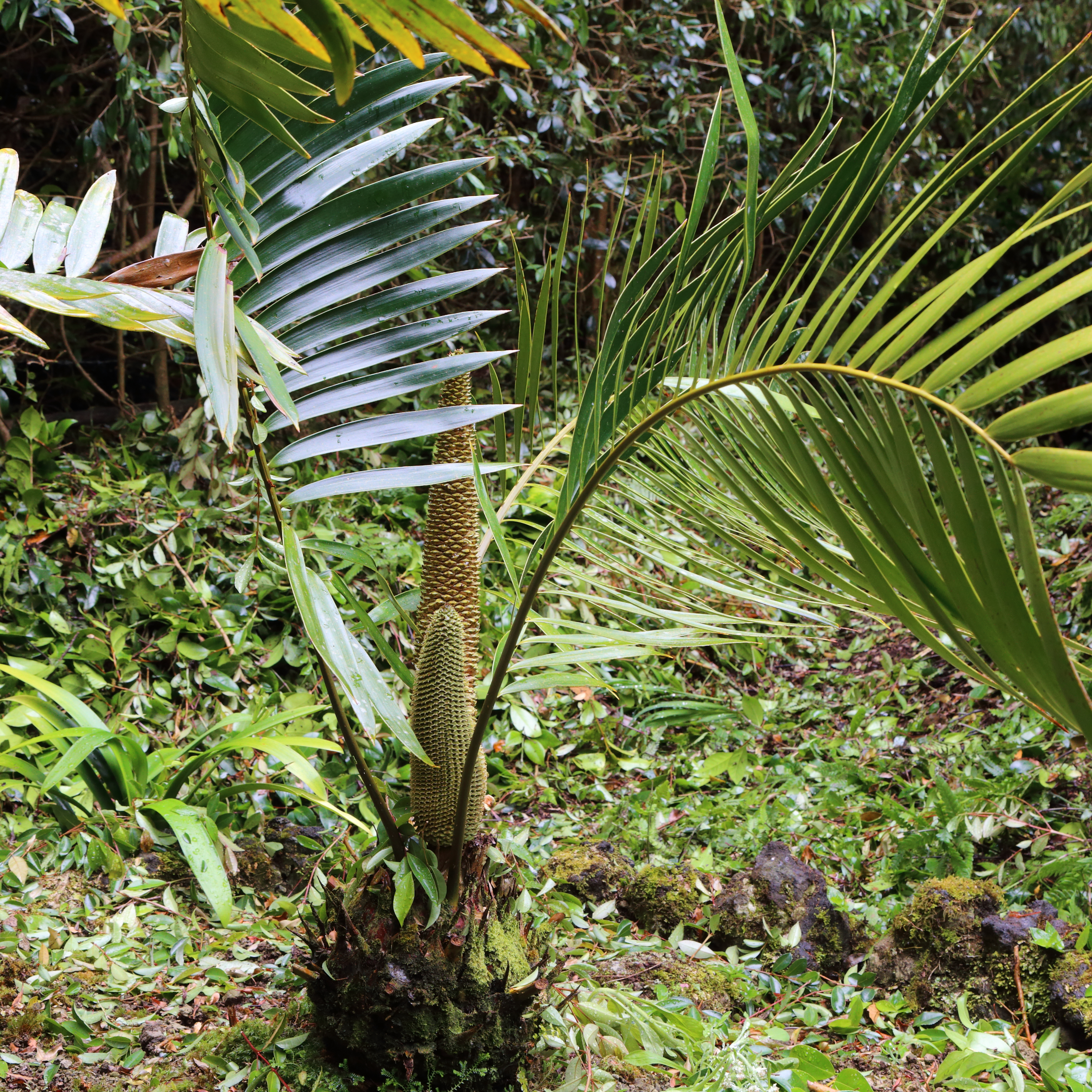

Conservation status
- Endangered (IUCN 3.1)
- CITES Appendix I

Scientific classification
- Kingdom: Plantae
- Clade: Tracheophytes
- Clade: Gymnospermae
- Division: Cycadophyta
- Class: Cycadopsida
- Order: Cycadales
- Family: Zamiaceae
- Genus: Ceratozamia
- Species: C. latifolia

Binomial name
- Ceratozamia latifolia Miq.

= Ceratozamia latifolia =

Species of cycad

Ceratozamia latifolia is a species of cycad in the family Zamiaceae that is endemic to Querétaro, Hidalgo and San Luis Potosí in Mexico. It inhabits cloud zone oak forests in the Sierra Madre Oriental.
