= Anfiteatro de Ticó Formation =

Geologic formation in Argentina

- Stratigraphic range: Aptian; ~119–116 Ma
- Type: Geological formation
- Unit of: Baqueró Group
- Underlies: Bajo Tigre Formation

Lithology
- Primary: Sandstone, siltstone
- Other: Conglomerate

Location
- Coordinates: 48.5°S 69.2°W
- Approximate paleocoordinates: 49.4°S 35.4°W
- Region: Santa Cruz
- Country: Argentina
- Extent: Deseado Massif

Type section
- Named for: Anfiteatro de Ticó, Santa Cruz, Argentina
- Named by: Sergio Archangelsky
- Anfiteatro de Ticó Formation (Argentina)

The Anfiteatro de Ticó Formation is a geological formation from the Deseado Massif in the province of Santa Cruz, Argentina.

== Paleobiology ==
The Anfiteatro de Ticó preserves a rich and diverse flora including macrofossils, mesofossils, and microfossils. These have been object of detailed investigations since the 1960'.

== Depositional environments ==
The formation is of continental origin, and includes riparian and lacustrine deposits.

== Fossil content ==
The following fossils were reported from the formation:

=== Flora ===
Bryophytes

- Ricciopsis grandensis

Horsetails

- Equisetites pusillus

Ferns

- Cladophlebis tripinnata
- Cladophlebis antarctica
- Cyathea cyathifolia
- Baqueroites padulae
- Adiantopteris tripinnata
- Korallipteris vegagrandis

Conifers

- Alkastrobus peltatus
- Apterocladus lanceolatus
- Morenostrobus fertilis
- Podocarpus dubius
- Squamastrobus tigrensis
- Tarphyderma glabra
- Tomaxellia degiustoi
- Tomaxellia biforme
- Trisacocladus tigrensis

Ginkgoales

- Ginkgoites tigrensis
- Ginkgoites ticoensis
- Allicospermum patagonicum
- Karkenia incurva

Cycadales

- Restrepophyllum chiguoides
- Eobowenia incrassata
- Sueria rectivervis
- Mesosingeria coriacea
- Mesosingeria oblonga
- Ticoa harrisii
- Ticoa lanceolata
- Ticoa magnipinnulata
- Pseudoctenis crassa
- Pseudoctenis dentata

Caytoniales

- Ruflorinia sierra
- Ruflorinia pilifera
- Ruflorinia papillosa
- Ktalenia circularis
