= Ceratozamia brevifrons =

Conservation status
- CITES Appendix I (CITES)

Scientific classification
- Kingdom: Plantae
- Clade: Tracheophytes
- Clade: Gymnospermae
- Division: Cycadophyta
- Class: Cycadopsida
- Order: Cycadales
- Family: Zamiaceae
- Genus: Ceratozamia
- Species: C. brevifrons

Binomial name
- Ceratozamia brevifrons Miq.

Species of cycad

Ceratozamia brevifrons is a species of cycad in the family Zamiaceae.
