= Ceratozamia hondurensis =

Conservation status
- CITES Appendix I (CITES)

Scientific classification
- Kingdom: Plantae
- Clade: Tracheophytes
- Clade: Gymnospermae
- Division: Cycadophyta
- Class: Cycadopsida
- Order: Cycadales
- Family: Zamiaceae
- Genus: Ceratozamia
- Species: C. hondurensis

Binomial name
- Ceratozamia hondurensis J.L.Haynes, Whitelock, Schutzman & R.S.Adams

Species of cycad

Ceratozamia hondurensis is a species of cycad in the family Zamiaceae.
