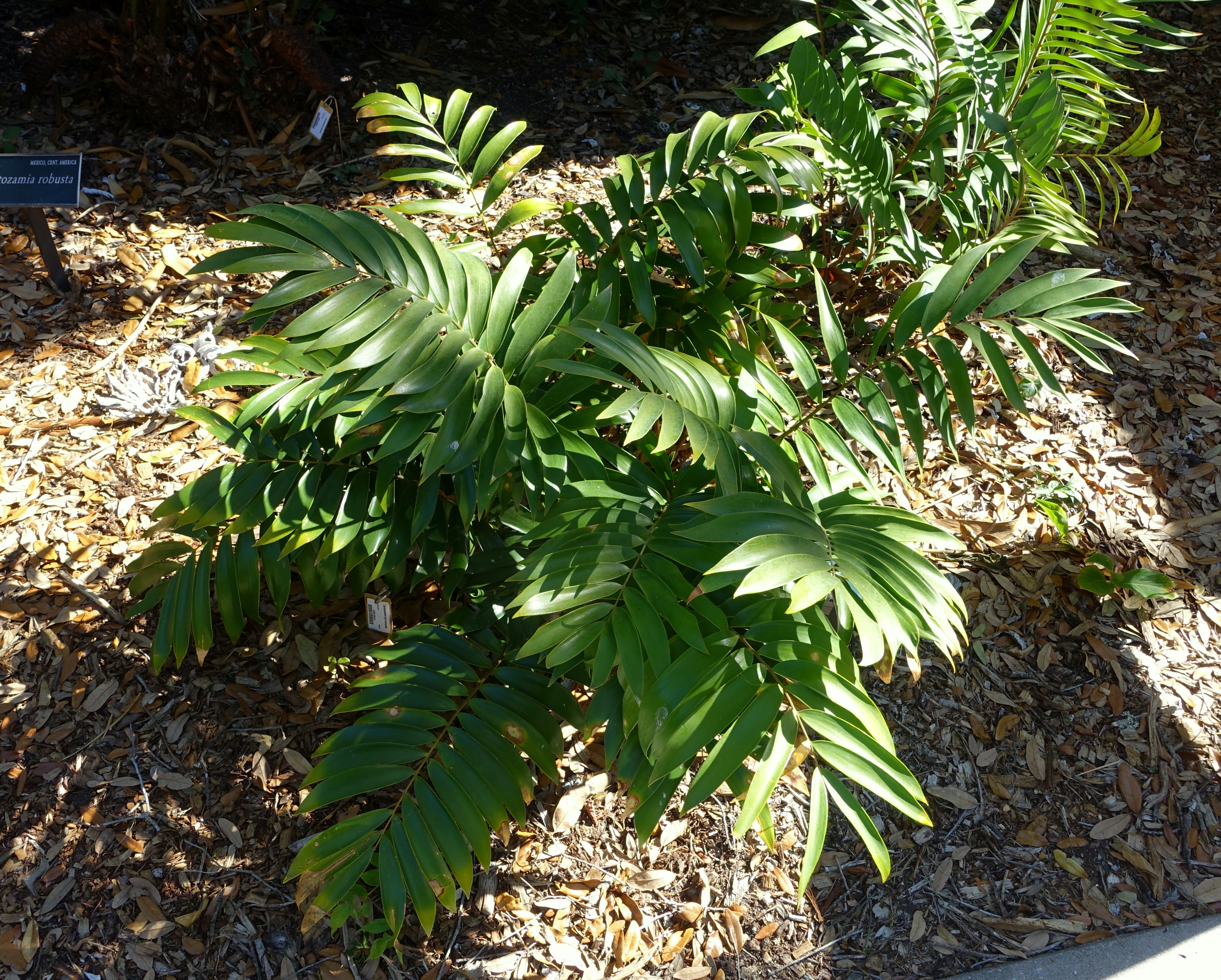

Conservation status
- Vulnerable (IUCN 3.1)
- CITES Appendix I (CITES)

Scientific classification
- Kingdom: Plantae
- Clade: Tracheophytes
- Clade: Gymnospermae
- Division: Cycadophyta
- Class: Cycadopsida
- Order: Cycadales
- Family: Zamiaceae
- Genus: Ceratozamia
- Species: C. microstrobila

Binomial name
- Ceratozamia microstrobila Vovides & J.D.Rees

= Ceratozamia microstrobila =

Species of cycad

Ceratozamia microstrobila is a species of plant in the family Zamiaceae.

== Description ==
Ceratozamia microstrobila has small glossy green leaves that are about 70 centimeters long. The new leaves of this plant take the color of bronze to darker brown. The plant produces small pollen cones. These cones have the color of yellowish green.

== Distribution ==
The plant is endemic to Mexico, within the state of San Luis Potosí and in the southern portion of Tamaulipas. It is native to a terrestrial environment that includes deciduous cloud forests and oak woods on limestone. It is found on Ejido las Abridas mountain in the Sierra Madre Oriental of San Luis Potosí State, and the very southern portion of Tamaulipas. There are at least 6 wild populations.

This species likes a well shaded area that is well drained.

It is threatened by habitat loss. It is recorded to be vulnerable to becoming an endangered species due to the decrease in population. In the past fifty years, the population of this Ceratozamia microstrobila has decreased between 30 and 50 percent.
