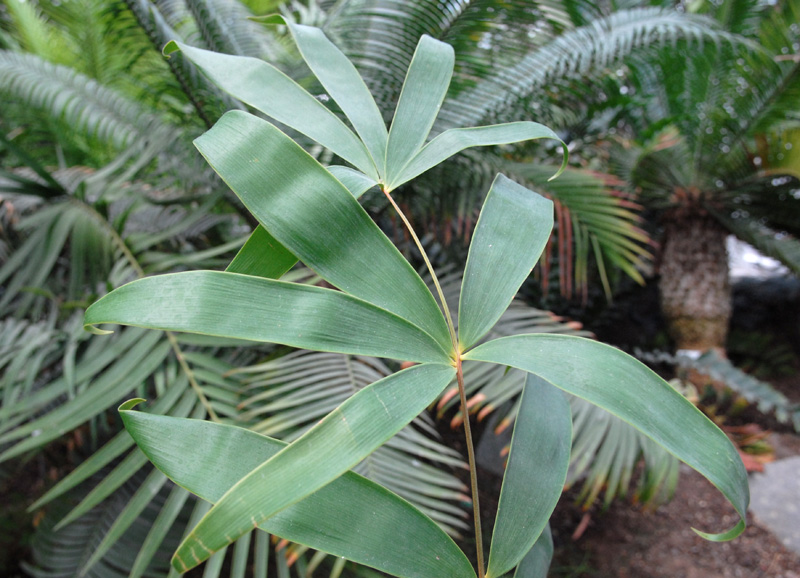

Conservation status
- Endangered (IUCN 3.1)
- CITES Appendix I

Scientific classification
- Kingdom: Plantae
- Clade: Tracheophytes
- Clade: Gymnospermae
- Division: Cycadophyta
- Class: Cycadopsida
- Order: Cycadales
- Family: Zamiaceae
- Genus: Ceratozamia
- Species: C. hildae

Binomial name
- Ceratozamia hildae G.P.Landry & M.C.Wilson

= Ceratozamia hildae =

Species of plant

Ceratozamia hildae, also known as the Bamboo Cycad, is a species of cycad. It thrives in moist, humid areas found in parts of Mexico. This species is native to the north-west Hidalgo, but has a larger potential range in areas with original vegetation. This family of plants is highly variable morphologically, but this species is unique in that has long, papery leaves. First described by Landry and Wilson, the plant was taken from the wild by Luciano Gurra, who originally named the species after his daughter, Hilda Gurra Walker. Despite being known in nurseries, this species has not been studied vastly.

== History and Taxonomy ==
This species was first brought to Texas in the early 1960s by Luciano Gurra, a plant collector who found Ceratozamia hildae interesting because it was unlike anything he's ever seen. This species was known in nurseries as the "Bamboo Cycad" due to the distribution of its leaflet clusters; and by the late 1960s, this species could be found coast to coast in the United States. This species gained popularity as it grows quickly and is able to survive a range of temperatures, full sun, and shaded conditions. This species is still cultivated in nurseries today. Although popular in cultivation, Ceratozamia hildae was not studied until years after its discovery. Garrie Landry and Marcia Wilson were the first to study and give a scientific name this plant. This species of cycad belongs to the family Zamiaceae and was named "hildae" to honor the common name, given by Luciano Gurra. A main reason for choosing "hildae" was because the common name was already known by many due to its popularity as a decorative plant species.

== Native Range ==
Ceratozamia hildae is found in Mexico along the Sierra Madre Oriental. Typically this species is found where other species of the Ceratozamia genus can be found. 30 out of 31 cycad families are found in Mexico. This species is endemic to the evergreen tropical forests in Mexico and San Luis Potosi.

== Morphology ==
The morphology of species within the Ceratozamia genus typically do not vary significantly, making them difficult to identify. Ceratozamia hildae has thin, papery leaflets, unlike other cycads that have leathery thick leaflets. Ceratozamia hildae leaflets cluster at nodes, giving it its bamboo appearance. The leaves can be up to 1.5 meters in length and first produce an underground stem. The plant will grow a branched root system first, and the above ground stems will grow up from these, only after a root system is established. It is impossible to tell which was the original stem and these stems can grow to be taller than 12 inches in height. Ceratozamia hildae produces both male and female cones, and seed cone maturation takes about 9 months. Pollinated cones will rot to release seeds which take about 90 days to germinate.

== Conservation ==
This species is endangered and facing extinction as deforestation is diminishing their natural habitat. Additionally, there has been overharvesting of this species specifically in the 60s and 70s that diminished a majority is the wild population. Other factors such as invasive species, climate change, urbanization and illegal harvesting has further threatened the native habitat and populations of all cycads. Although the species is diminishing in it natural habitat, Ceratozamia hildae is highly cultivated and planted as ornamental decorations so the population will most likely survive for years to come, even if the wild populations become extinct. These cultivated populations allow for the possibility of reintroductions in the future if conditions change. There have been attempts at conserving and protecting this species but they have been ultimately unsuccessful. With the population depleted and the habitat shrinking, this population remains endangered and it is likely that the wild populations will become extinct. A reason for why conservation strategies have been unsuccessful is because that there is a disconnect between policy management strategies and community attitudes. This is likely due to the mismatch in how the locals view protecting a species and how biologist view conserving biodiversity. A common attitude is that Ceratozamia hildae does not directly benefit the local economy so, why should there be efforts to save this species. To get a management strategy that works, education about the benefits of biodiversity is needed.

== Gallery ==
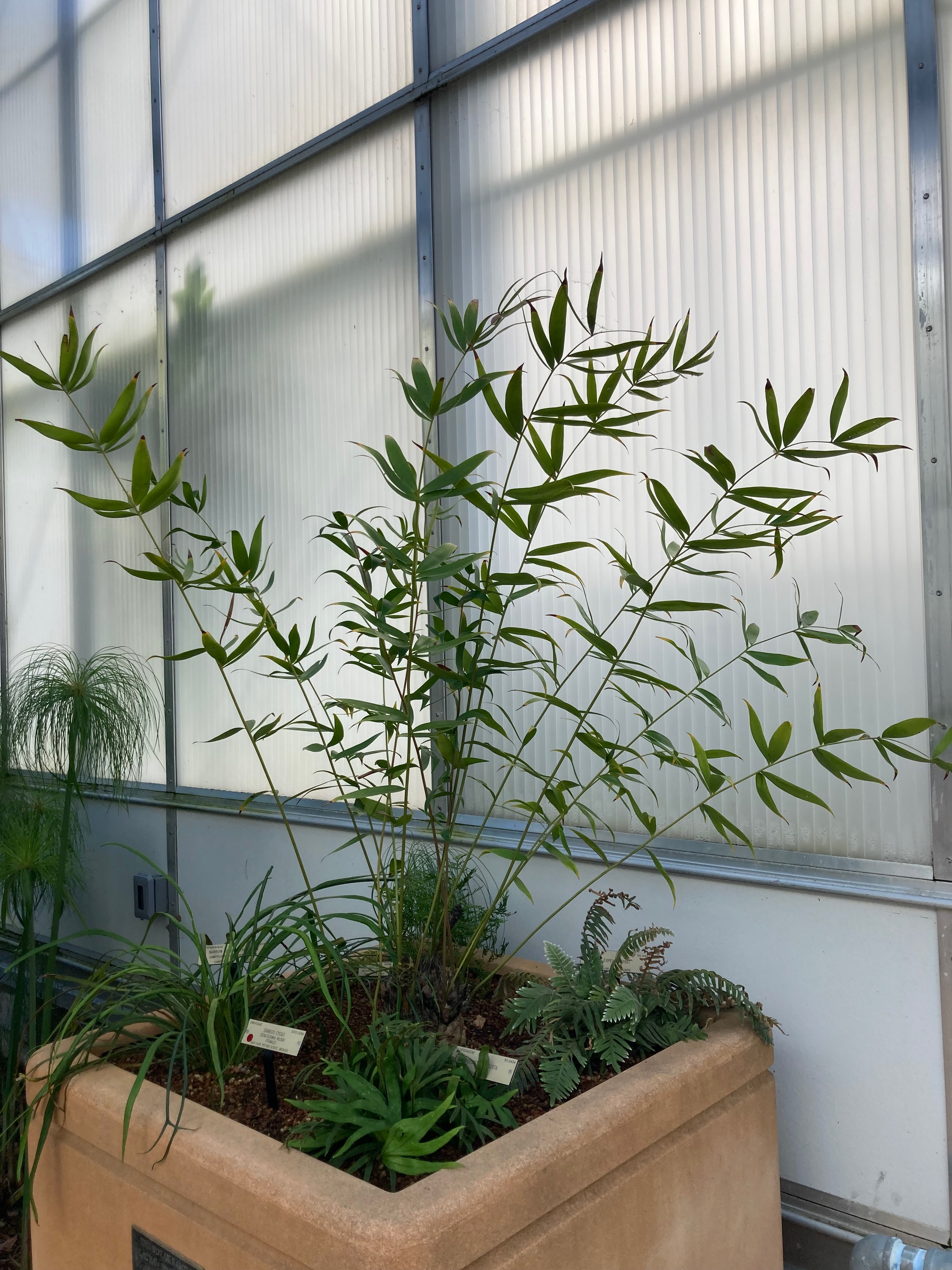
Ceratozamia hildae at the UC Botanical Garden.

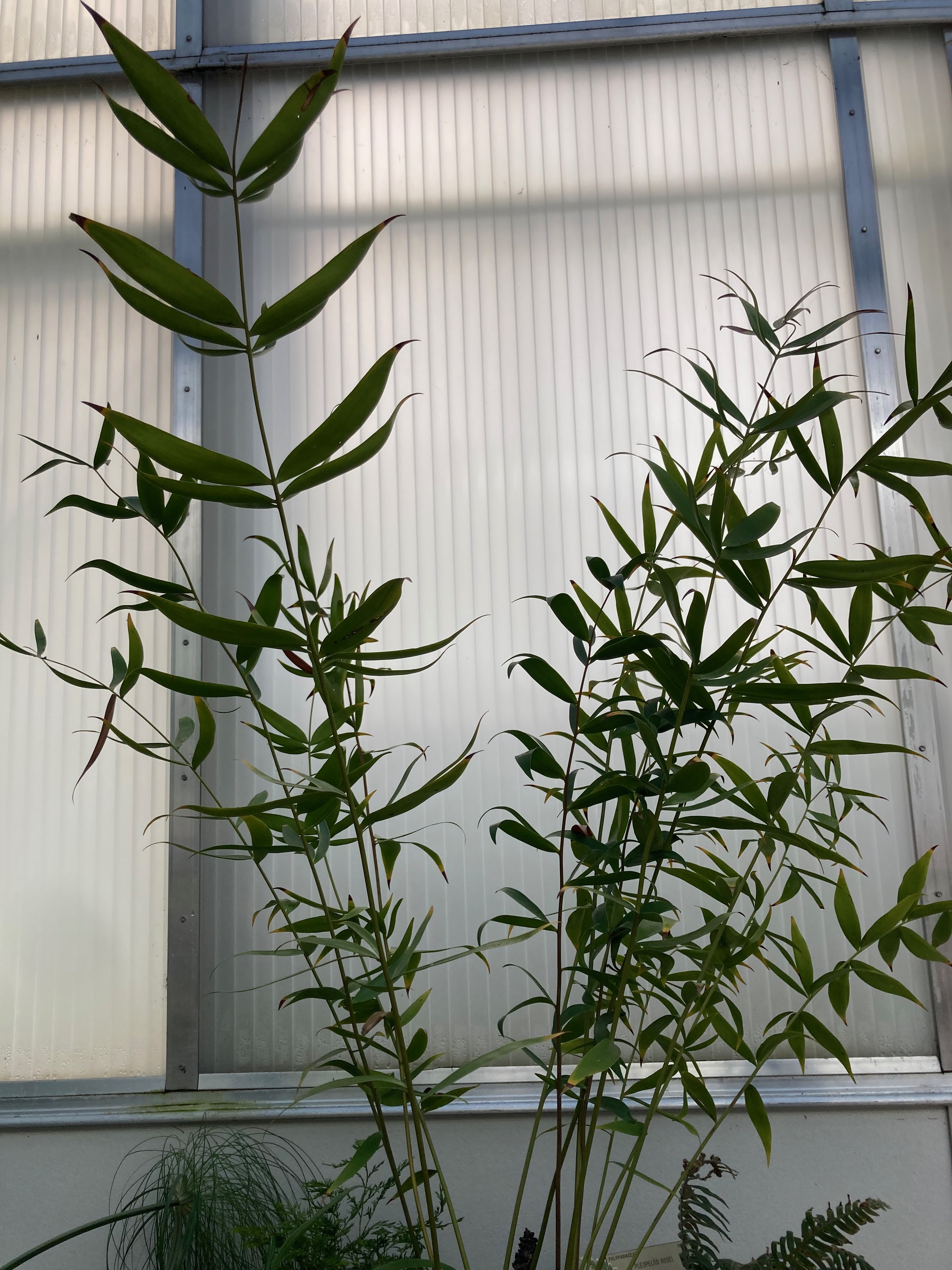
Detail of Ceratozamia hildae leaves.
