= Loran Whitelock =

American botanist (1930–2014)

Loran M. Whitelock (April 21, 1930 – May 27, 2014) was an American botanist who specialized in Cycads, a prehistoric plant that once dominated the planet and is now somewhat rare and endangered. He was known as a plant collector, plant curator, nursery owner, author, and conservationist. He was instrumental in promoting cycads as a garden feature in Southern California through his nursery and other contributions. Several plants were named in his honor including Encephalartos whitelockii and Ceratozamia whitelockiana.

== Cycad Gardens ==
He created, owned, managed, curated for, and grew plants for Cycad Gardens. Cycad Gardens is a botanical garden and nursery located on about an acre of land in back of his home in Eagle Rock, CA. It contains one of the most extensive collections of Cycads in the world, and is noted for its importance to conservation efforts. It was described by the Los Angeles Times as “monumental and weird… walking through it is like traveling back in time to Jurassic days”.

== Publications ==
He published extensively on Cycads and wrote “The Cycads”, a standard reference on the subject and described by the Miami Harald as “encyclopedic”. Cycad Gardens was started in 1972.

== Education and career ==
Whitelock earned his Bachelor of Science degree in biology, studying in botany, zoology, and microbiology. He worked for the Los Angeles City and County Health Departments then became a landscape designer in Los Angeles.

== Expeditions and conservationism ==
Whitelock was known for his extensive travels to remote locations in search of cycads, and for his conservation efforts, described by the Los Angeles Times as “a local legend”. Whitelock was a frequent commentator on theft of valuable rare and endangered plants from the wild, and of very valuable specimens from private collections. 1,500 of Whitelock's cycads were donated to the nearby Huntington Botanical Gardens after his death, forming one of the largest collections of cycads in the world.
