= Ruflorinia =

Ruflorinia Temporal range: Early Cretaceous

Scientific classification
- Kingdom: Plantae
- Division: †Pteridospermatophyta
- Order: Caytoniales
- Genus: Ruflorinia S.Archang.

Species
- R. sierra (type species); R. pilifera; R. papillosa; R. orlandoi

Extinct genus of Caytoniales

Ruflorinia is a genus of fossilized foliage from the Early Cretaceous of Argentina assigned to the order Caytoniales.

== Taxonomy ==
The genus was first established by Sergio Archangelsky based on material from the Anfiteatro de Ticó Formation, Santa Cruz, Argentina, with the type species being Ruflorinia sierra. The genus name celebrated the Swedish paleobotanist Rudolf Florin. Other two species (R. pilifera and R. papillosa) were later described from the Anfiteatro de Ticó and another (R.orlandoi) was later described from the Springhill Formation in Argentina.

== Paleoecology ==
In the Anfiteatro de Ticó Formation, leaves of this genus are found in association with the ovulate organ Ktalenia, and the conifer Brachyphyllum, and the foliage of Mesodescolea. The depositional environment is characterized by river deposits, and the fossils show little evidence of transport.
