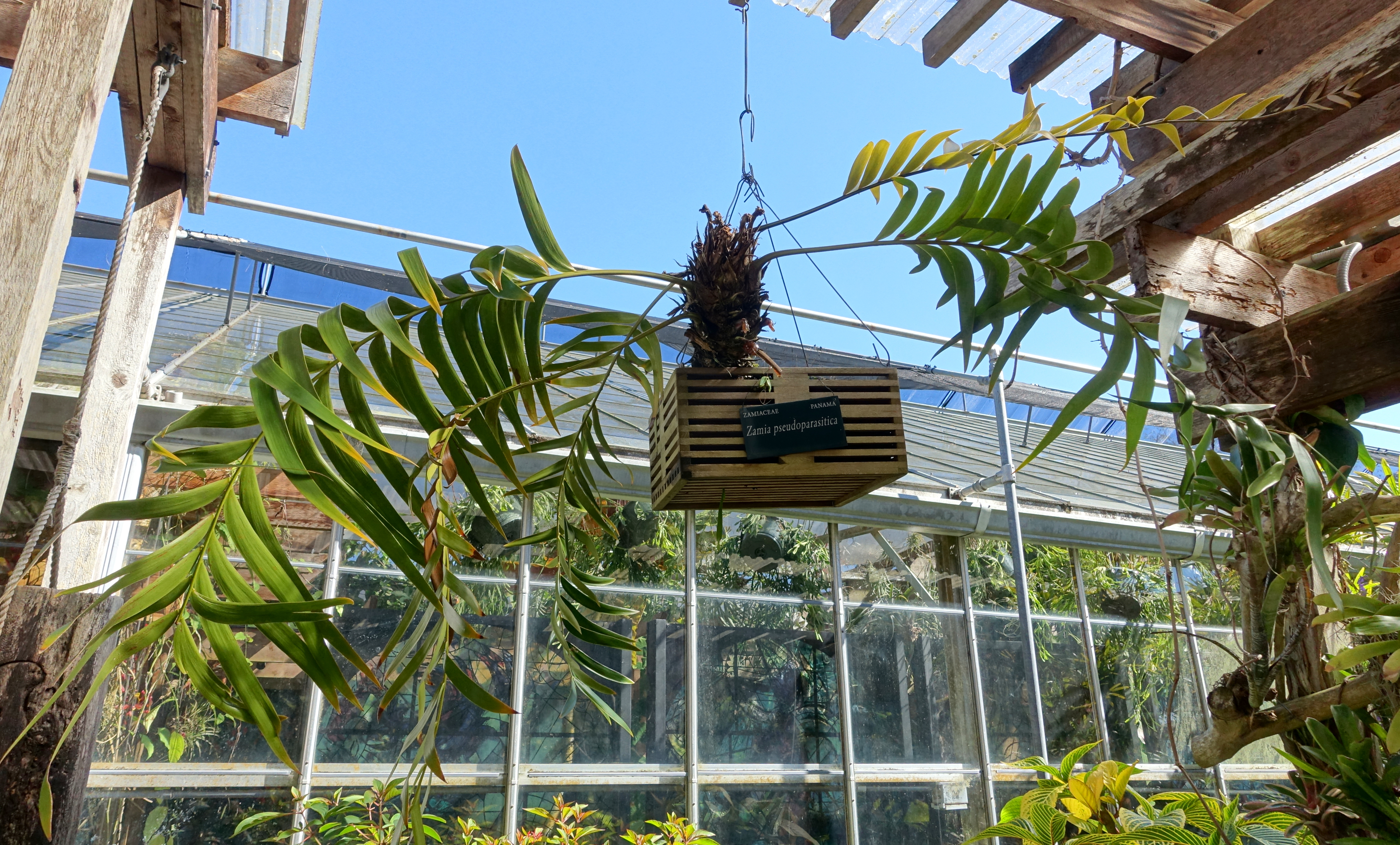

Conservation status
- Near Threatened (IUCN 3.1)
- CITES Appendix II

Scientific classification
- Kingdom: Plantae
- Clade: Tracheophytes
- Clade: Gymnosperms
- Division: Cycadophyta
- Class: Cycadopsida
- Order: Cycadales
- Family: Zamiaceae
- Genus: Zamia
- Species: Z. pseudoparasitica

Binomial name
- Zamia pseudoparasitica J.Yates
- Zamia pseudoparasitica is endemic to Panama

Synonyms
- Palmifolium pseudoparasiticum (J.Yates) Kuntze; Zamia ortgiesii A.Braun ex J.Schust.; Zamia pseudoparasitica var. latifolia J.Schust.

= Zamia pseudoparasitica =

Species of cycad

Zamia pseudoparasitica is a species of plant in the family Zamiaceae. It is endemic to Panama.

== Habitat ==
Its natural habitat is subtropical or tropical moist lowland forests on the Atlantic side of the isthmus. It is threatened by habitat loss.

== Description ==
Zamia pseudoparasitica is the only known species of Zamia that is epiphytic. Furthermore, it is the only known obligate epiphytic gymnosperm. growing on the branches of forest trees. It has a very short trunk but long leaves over 3 m long. The seeds are orange.

The root system can be very long and may reach and root in the ground in some cases. Taproots of 15 m in length have been documented.

== Cytology ==
The diploid chromosome count of Zamia pseudoparasitica is 2n = 16.

== Ecology ==
=== Pollination ===
The beetle Notorhopalotria taylori appears to be the main pollinator of Zamia pseudoparasitica. The beetle lives in the male cones of Zamia pseudoparasitica.

=== Seed dispersal ===
The seeds are thought to be disseminated by northern olingo,Toucans, or potentially by fruit-eating bats.

== Conservation ==
Primary forest is an important habitat for this species, as it has been unable to re-colonize secondary forests within a timeframe of 50 years.

== Horticulture ==
Some attempts have been made to bring the plant into cultivation as a plant to be grown in a hanging basket, with some degree of success. Watering should be done with soft, slightly acidic water. The substrate, which may be composed of coco chips, bark, moss, and anorganic materials like pumice and perlite, should be kept moist and should not dry out completely.

== Gallery ==
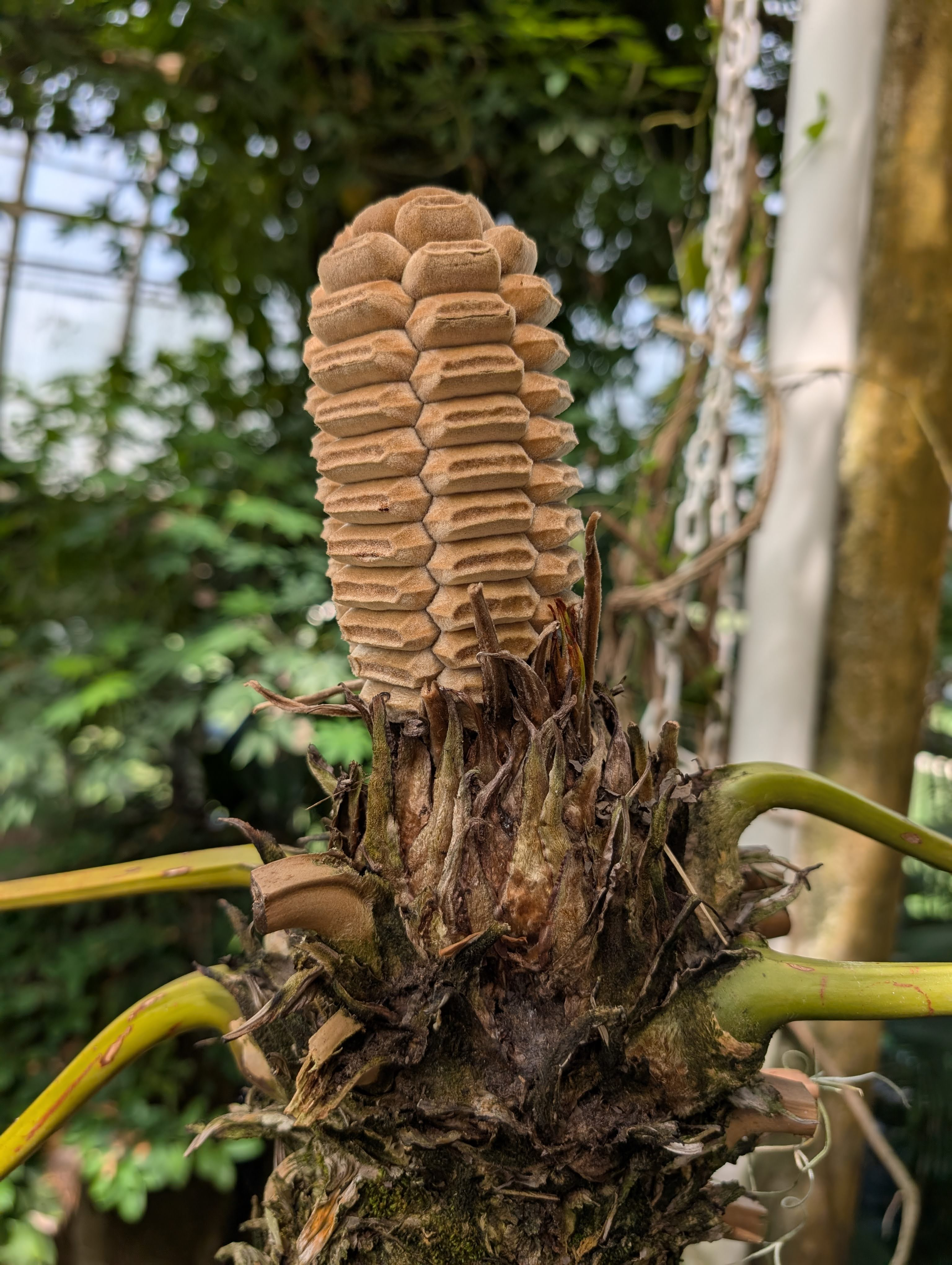
Front view of Zamia pseudoparasitica

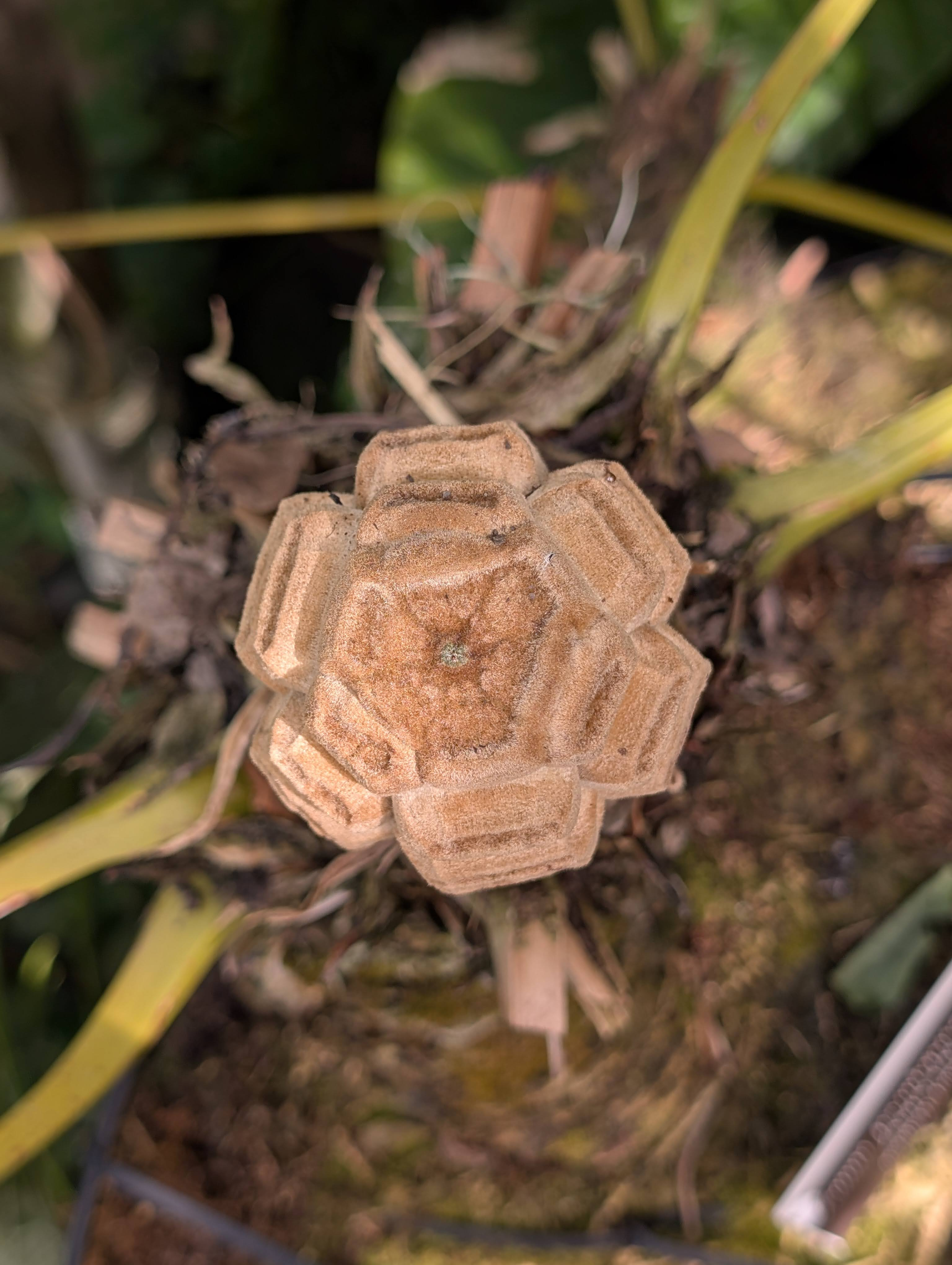
Top view of Zamia pseudoparasitica
