= Restrepophyllum =

Restrepophyllum Temporal range: Early Cretaceous

Scientific classification
- Kingdom: Plantae
- Clade: Embryophytes
- Clade: Tracheophytes
- Clade: Gymnosperms
- Division: Cycadophyta
- Class: Cycadopsida
- Order: Cycadales
- Family: Zamiaceae
- Genus: †Restrepophyllum; M.G.Passalia, G.Del Fueyo & S.Archangelsky, 2010

Species
- Restrepophyllum chiguoides (type species)

Extinct genus of cycads

Restrepophyllum is a genus of fossil foliage attributable to the Zamiaceae. This genus is found in Early Cretaceous rocks from Argentina.

== Taxonomy ==
The genus was erected based on material from the Anfiteratro de Ticó Formation in Argentina based on a single specimen preserved with cuticle./ The name of the genus was chosen to highlight the similarity with Zamia restrepoi (D.W.Stev.) A.Lindstr., a species of Zamia previously segregated in the genus Chigua.
