= Ticoa =

Ticoa Temporal range: Aptian

Scientific classification
- Kingdom: Plantae
- Division: ?Cycadophyta
- Class: ?Cycadopsida
- Order: ?Cycadales
- Genus: †Ticoa S.Archang.

Type species
- †Ticoa harrisii S.Archang.

Species
- †Ticoa harrisii; †Ticoa jeffersonii; †Ticoa lamellata; †Ticoa lanceolata; †Ticoa magallanica; †Ticoa magnipinnulata

Extinct genus of cycads

Ticoa is an extinct genus originally assigned to the Cycadales from the Early Cretaceous of Argentina, Chile, and Antarctica. Other authors view this genus as a member of the polyphyletic "seed ferns".

== Taxonomy ==
The genus was erected by Sergio Archangelsky based on material from the Anfiteatro de Ticó formation. The genus first comprised two species, T. harrisii and T. magnipinnulata, with T. lamellata being described from the Bajo Grande locality in Patagonia, Argentina. The species T. magallanica was described from the Springhill formation in Chile. T. jeffersonii was described from Hope Bay in Antarctica. T. lanceolata was described much later from the Anfiteatro de Ticó formation .

== Description ==
Ticoa includes large, bipinnate or tripinnate leaves with pecopteroid pinnules and a robust rachis. The cuticle, either hypostomatous or amphistomatous, presents large stomata sunken in a pit formed by multiple subsidiary and encircling cells.
