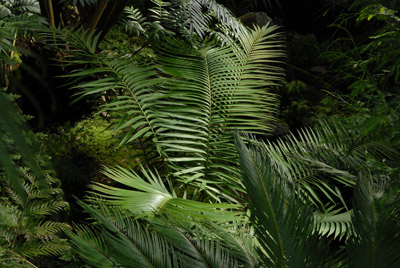
- Ceratozamia mexicana

Conservation status
- CITES Appendix I

Scientific classification
- Kingdom: Plantae
- Clade: Tracheophytes
- Clade: Gymnospermae
- Division: Cycadophyta
- Class: Cycadopsida
- Order: Cycadales
- Family: Zamiaceae
- Subfamily: Zamioideae
- Tribe: Ceratozamieae; D.W.Stev.
- Genus: Ceratozamia; Brongn.

Type species
- Ceratozamia mexicana Brongn.

Synonyms
- Dipsacozamia Lehm.; Eriozamia Schuster nom. nud.

= Ceratozamia =

Genus of cycads

Ceratozamia is a genus of New World cycads in the family Zamiaceae. The genus contains 27 known currently living species and one or two fossil species. Most species are endemic to mountainous areas of Mexico, while few species extend into the mountains of Guatemala, Honduras and Belize. The genus name comes from the Greek ceras, meaning horn, which refers to the paired, spreading horny projections on the male and female sporophylls of all species.

Many species have extremely limited ranges, and almost all described species are listed as vulnerable, endangered, or critically endangered by the IUCN Red List. The whole genus is listed under CITES Appendix I / EU Annex A, which prohibits international trade in specimens of these species except when the purpose of the import is not commercial, for instance for scientific research. Illegal plant poaching has posed a major threat to Ceratozamia species.

== Description ==
The plants are dioecious, with a globose or cylindrical stem, rarely dichotomously branched, that may be underground or emergent. Several species produce basal shoots or suckers. The leaves are pinnately compound, straight, and spirally arranged. Leaf bases are usually deciduous but sometimes persistent. The petioles and rachis often have spines, though there may be very few to none. Leaflets are simple, entire, and articulate at the base, with parallel side veins and no distinct central vein. Male cones are cylindrical, upright, hairy, and stalked. Female cones are stalked or sessile, erect, and have short hairs. Seeds are oblong or elliptical, with a fleshy whitish outer coat.

== Distribution and habitat ==
Most species inhabit mountainous areas at 800–1000 m elevation, on sheltered slopes in moist forests. These forests range from tropical rainforests that are always wet, to pine-oak forests with alternating wet and dry seasons. There is a noticeable correlation between characteristics of species and the wetness or dryness of the habitat. Species with broad, thin leaflets live in wet habitats, and species with narrow, thick leaflets live in climates with wet and dry seasons.

== Classification ==
The genus consists of 27 known species:

Phylogeny of Ceratozamia

- - C. robusta Miquel
  - - - C. huastecorum
      - C. zoquorum
    - - C. fuscoviridis
      - - - C. hildae (Bamboo cycad)
          - - C. morettii
            - C. mexicana
        - - C. decumbens
          - - C. latifolia
            - - C. microstrobila
              - - C. kuesteriana
                - - - C. mixeorum
                    - - C. sabatoi
                      - C. zaragozae
                  - - - C. matudae
                      - - C. alvarezii
                        - C. norstogii
                    - - C. vovidesii
                      - - C. mirandae
                        - - C. chimalapensis
                          - - C. euryphyllidia
                            - - C. whitelockiana
                              - - C. becerrae
                                - C. miqueliana

Image	Leaves	Scientific name	Distribution
		Ceratozamia alvarezii Pérez-Farr., Vovides & Iglesias	Chiapas
		Ceratozamia aurantiaca Pérez-Farrera et al.	Chiapas
		Ceratozamia becerrae Pérez-Farr., Vovides & Schutzman	Tabasco, Chiapas
		Ceratozamia brevifrons Miq.	Veracruz
		Ceratozamia chamberlainii Martínez-Domínguez	Chiapas
		Ceratozamia chimalapensis Pérez-Farr. & Vovides	Oaxaca
		Ceratozamia decumbens Vovides, S.Avendaño, Pérez-Farr. & González-Astorga	Veracruz
		Ceratozamia delucana Vázquez-Torres, Moretti & Carvajal-Hernández 2009 ex Vázquez-Torres, Moretti & Carvajal-Hernández	
		Ceratozamia dominguezii Pérez-Farrera & Gutiérrez-Ortega	
		Ceratozamia euryphyllidia Vázq. Torres, Sabato & D.W. Stev.	Veracruz, Oaxaca
		Ceratozamia fuscoviridis D. Moore	Hidalgo
		Ceratozamia hildae G.P. Landry & M.C. Wilson	Querétaro, San Luis Potosí
		Ceratozamia hondurensis J.L. Haynes, Whitelock, Schutzman & R.S. Adams	Honduras
		Ceratozamia huastecorum S. Avendaño, Vovides & Cast.-Campos	Veracruz
		Ceratozamia kuesteriana Regel	Tamaulipas
		Ceratozamia latifolia Miq.	Querétaro, San Luis Potosí, Hidalgo
		Ceratozamia leptoceras Martínez-Domínguez et al.	
		Ceratozamia matudae Lundell	Chiapas, Guatemala
		Ceratozamia mexicana Brongn.	Puebla, Veracruz
		Ceratozamia microstrobila Vovides & J.D. Rees	San Luis Potosí
		Ceratozamia miqueliana H. Wendl.	Veracruz, Tabasco, Chiapas
		Ceratozamia mirandae Vovides, Pérez-Farr. & Iglesias	Chiapas
		Ceratozamia mixeorum Chemnick, T.J. Greg. & S. Salas-Mor.	Oaxaca
		Ceratozamia morettii Vázq. Torres & Vovides	Veracruz
		Ceratozamia norstogii D.W. Stev.	Oaxaca, Chiapas
		Ceratozamia oliversacksii Stevenson, Martínez-Domínguez & Nicolalde-Morejón	
		Ceratozamia osbornei Stevenson, Martínez-Domínguez & Nicolalde-Morejón	
		Ceratozamia reesii Vovides, Pérez Farrera & Gutiérrez-Ortega	
		Ceratozamia robusta Miq.	Veracruz, Oaxaca, Chiapas, Belize, Guatemala
		Ceratozamia sabatoi Vovides, Vázq. Torres, Schutzman & Iglesias	Querétaro, Hidalgo
		Ceratozamia sancheziae Pérez-Farr., Gutiérrez-Ortega & Vovides	
		Ceratozamia santillanii Pérez-Farr. & Vovides	Chiapas
		Ceratozamia schiblii Pérez-Farrera & Gutiérrez-Ortega	
		Ceratozamia subroseophylla Martínez-Domínguez & Nicolalde-Morejón	
		Ceratozamia tenuis (Dyer 1884) Stevenson & Vovides	
		Ceratozamia totonacorum Martínez-Domínguez & Nicolalde-Morejón	
		Ceratozamia vovidesii Pérez-Farr. & Iglesias	Chiapas
		Ceratozamia whitelockiana Chemnick & T.J. Greg.	Oaxaca
		Ceratozamia zaragozae Medellin-Leal	San Luis Potosí
		Ceratozamia zoquorum Pérez-Farr., Vovides & Iglesias	Chiapas

== Fossil record ==
There are several described fossil species, among them †Ceratozamia hofmannii and †Ceratozamia wrightii. Ceratozamia wrightii is the first evidence of the genus in the fossil record, with leaf fragments of the species found in Eocene deposits on Kupreanof Island in Alaska. This would support the hypothesis that there was a subtropical climate in northern areas during the Tertiary.

A fossil leaflet fragment of †Ceratozamia floersheimensis from the Rupelian stage of the Lower Oligocene has been found in marine sediments of the Bodenheim Formation in Rauenberg, Baden-Württemberg, Germany. Apart from Rauenberg and Flörsheim in Germany it is also known from the Oligocene of Budapest, Hungary and Trbovlje, Slovenia. A modern relationship exists to C. microstrobila, C. moretti, C. latifoli and C. delucana.

A fossil leaf fragment of †Ceratozamia hofmannii has been recorded and described from Münzenberg near Leoben (upper Lower Miocene of Styria, Austria. A fragmentary leaflet assigned to †C. hofmannii was recovered in the uppermost part of the Most Formation (Most Basin)) in North Bohemia, Czech Republic and dated by magnetostratigraphy and cyclostratigraphy to the last part of the early Miocene.

== Bibliography ==
- Jones, David L. (2002). Cycads of the World: Ancient Plants in Today's Landscape. Washington, D.C.: Smithsonian Institution Press. ISBN 1-58834-043-0.
