= Sergio Archangelsky =

Argentine paleontologist and palynologist (1931–2022)

- Born: 27 March 1931; Casablanca, Morocco
- Died: 10 July 2022 (aged 91)
- Education: University of Buenos Aires (PhD)
- Known for: Cuticular ultrastructure
- Scientific career
- Fields: Paleontology, Paleobotany, Palynology
- Workplaces: Instituto Miguel Lillo; CONICET; CIRGEO; Universidad Nacional de La Plata

Sergio Archangelsky (27 March 1931 – 10 July 2022) was an Argentine paleobotanist and palynologist. He was a pioneer of modern paleobotany in Argentina, as well as of cuticular morphology and ultrastructure. He was also a corresponding member of the Argentine Academy of Science.

== Biography ==
Sergio Archangelsky was born on 27 March 1931. He obtained his master's degree in geology (1954) and his doctorate (1957) at the University of Buenos Aires. While preparing for his doctorate, he started working in Tucumán (1955–61), at the Lillo Foundation, where he later will become Professor of Paleontology and geology. Thanks to a fellowship from the British Council, he was able to visit Britain, where he spent time working at the University of Glasgow, the University of Reading, and the Natural History Museum in London, where he interacted and collaborated with Thomas Harris. In 1961 he became a member of the CONICET and was Professor of Paleobotany at the Museum of Natural Sciences of La Plata. He organized and directed the Paleobotany and Palynology Unit of CIRGEO-CONICET (1975–83). He was distinguished visiting professor at Ohio State University (US, 1984) and upon his return, he worked at the Argentine Museum of Natural Sciences. Archangelsky died on 10 July 2022, at the age of 91.

== Works and recognition ==
Archangelsky authored more than 200 scientific articles, reaching over 7000 citations. He has been the first to apply ultrathin sectioning and Transmission Electron Microscopy to fossil cuticles.

Archangelsky also described some of the most diverse fossil flora from the Early Cretaceous of the southern Hemisphere from what is now known as the Baqueró Group. Among the fossils he described are the oldest angiosperms from southern South America.

Archangelsky described numerous new genera of fossil plants, such as Mesodescolea, Mesosingeria, Ruflorinia, Ticoa, as well as a new family of fossil conifers (Ferugliocladaceae).

The genus Archangelskya Herbst. has been named after him.
