= Mesosingeria =

Mesosingeria Temporal range: Early Cretaceous

Scientific classification
- Kingdom: Plantae
- Clade: Tracheophytes
- Clade: Gymnospermae
- Division: Cycadophyta
- Class: Cycadopsida
- Order: Cycadales
- Genus: Mesosingeria; S.Archang.

Species
- M. coriacea (type species); M. herbstii; M. mucronata; M. obtusa; M. oblonga; M. parva; M. striata

Extinct genus of Cycadales

Mesosingeria is a genus of fossil foliage attributable to the Cycadales. This genus is found in Early Cretaceous rocks from Argentina.

== Taxonomy ==
The genus was erected by Sergio Archangelsky based on material from the Anfiteratro de Ticó Formation in Argentina to include two species, namely M.coriacea and M. herbstii. The name of the genus is dedicated to the mycologist Rolf Singer. Other five species were later added to the genus from the same localities.

== Description ==
The genus includes foliage fossils of bipinnate leaves with a flat rachis. The pinnules are oblong to lanceolate, alternate, with one or more veins entering each pinnule, then dichotomizing and continuing straight to the apex. The cuticle presents monocyclic stomata which are usually sunken in a stomatal pit constricted by a ring of cuticle on the outside.
