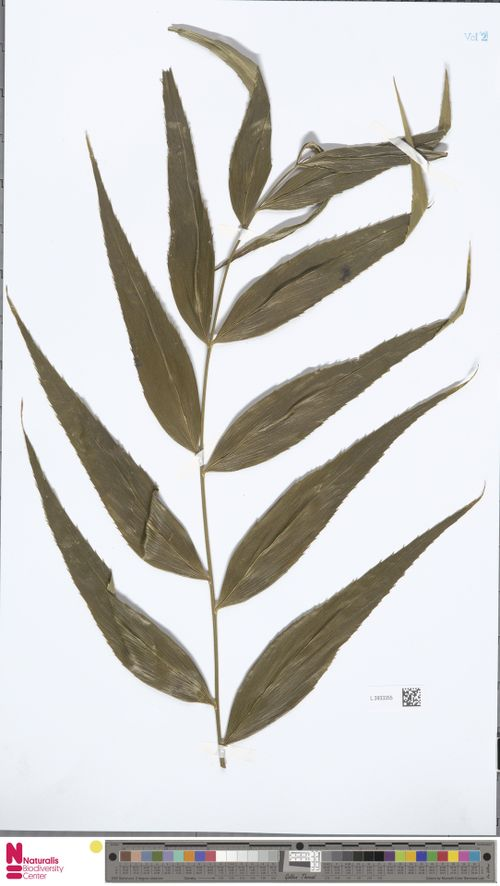

Conservation status
- Critically Endangered (IUCN 3.1)
- CITES Appendix I

Scientific classification
- Kingdom: Plantae
- Clade: Tracheophytes
- Clade: Gymnospermae
- Division: Cycadophyta
- Class: Cycadopsida
- Order: Cycadales
- Family: Zamiaceae
- Genus: Zamia
- Species: Z. restrepoi

Binomial name
- Zamia restrepoi (D.W.Stev.) A.Lindstr.

Synonyms
- Chigua bernalii; Chigua restrepoi

= Zamia restrepoi =

Species of cycad

Zamia restrepoi is a species of cycad in the family Zamiaceae.

As of 2020, according to a preliminary field investigations the sole remaining known subpopulation is alarmingly small, comprising fewer than 100 adult specimens. There is a potential for the existence of additional subpopulations, but extensive field surveys have been unsuccessful in locating them, necessitating further research to comprehensively understand the species' population distribution and abundance.

== Classification history ==
The Type for Zamia restrepoi was first collected in 1918 by Francis W. Pennell in northern Colombia. The type was not reported again until re-located by Rogrigo Bernal in 1986. Dennis Stevenson described the genus Chigua and two species, C. restrepoi and C. bernalii, in 1990. It was recognized that Chigua was very closely related to Zamia and might indeed be nested in Zamia. In 2009, Anders Lindström reclassified C. restrepoi as Z. restrepoi and C. bernalii as a synonym of Z. restrepoi.

== Description ==
The stem of Zamia restrepoi is subterranean, ellipsoid in shape, and up to 10 centimetres (3.9 in) in diameter. There are two to five compound-leaves on each plant. The leafs are 120 to 180 centimetres (47 to 71 in) long, with a 60 to 80 centimetres (24 to 31 in) long petiole (stalk) and 60 to 100 centimetres (24 to 39 in) long rachis (leaf axis). The stalk and lower part of the leaf axis are covered with small prickles. Leaflets are toothed on their edges. There are 20 to 30 leaflets on a leaf. Leaflets are lanceolate, and 15 to 25 centimetres (5.9 to 9.8 in) long and 3 to 5 centimetres (1.2 to 2.0 in) wide.

== Habitat and threats ==
Zamia restrepoi grows between 100 and 1,000 metres (330 and 3,280 ft) elevation in rain forest, secondary forest, coffee plantations, and on the edges of pastures. It is found in Darien Province in Panama and adjacent Colombia. Construction of a dam began in 1990 that eventually flooded most of the known habitat for Z. restrepoi. As of 2008, some plants survived in degraded forests near the new lake. Other plants rescued from the flooding had been replanted in reforested areas at higher altitudes. Only around 30 individuals were saved. In 2012, a small subpopulation of less than 100 adults was found in two tiny forest patches nearby. These patches are at risk from deforestation caused by agricultural and urban expansion, especially for cattle ranching and crops, making the species' survival uncertain.

== Sources ==
- Lindstrom, Anders J. (February 2009). "Typification of some species names in Zamia L. ( Zamiaceae ), with an assessment of the status of Chigua D. Stev". Taxon. 58 (1): 265–270. doi:10.1002/tax.581025. ISSN 0040-0262.
- Stevenson, Dennis Wm. (April 2004). "Cycads of Colombia". The Botanical Review. 70 (2): 194–234. doi:10.1663/0006-8101(2004)070[0194:COC]2.0.CO;2. ISSN 1874-9372.
