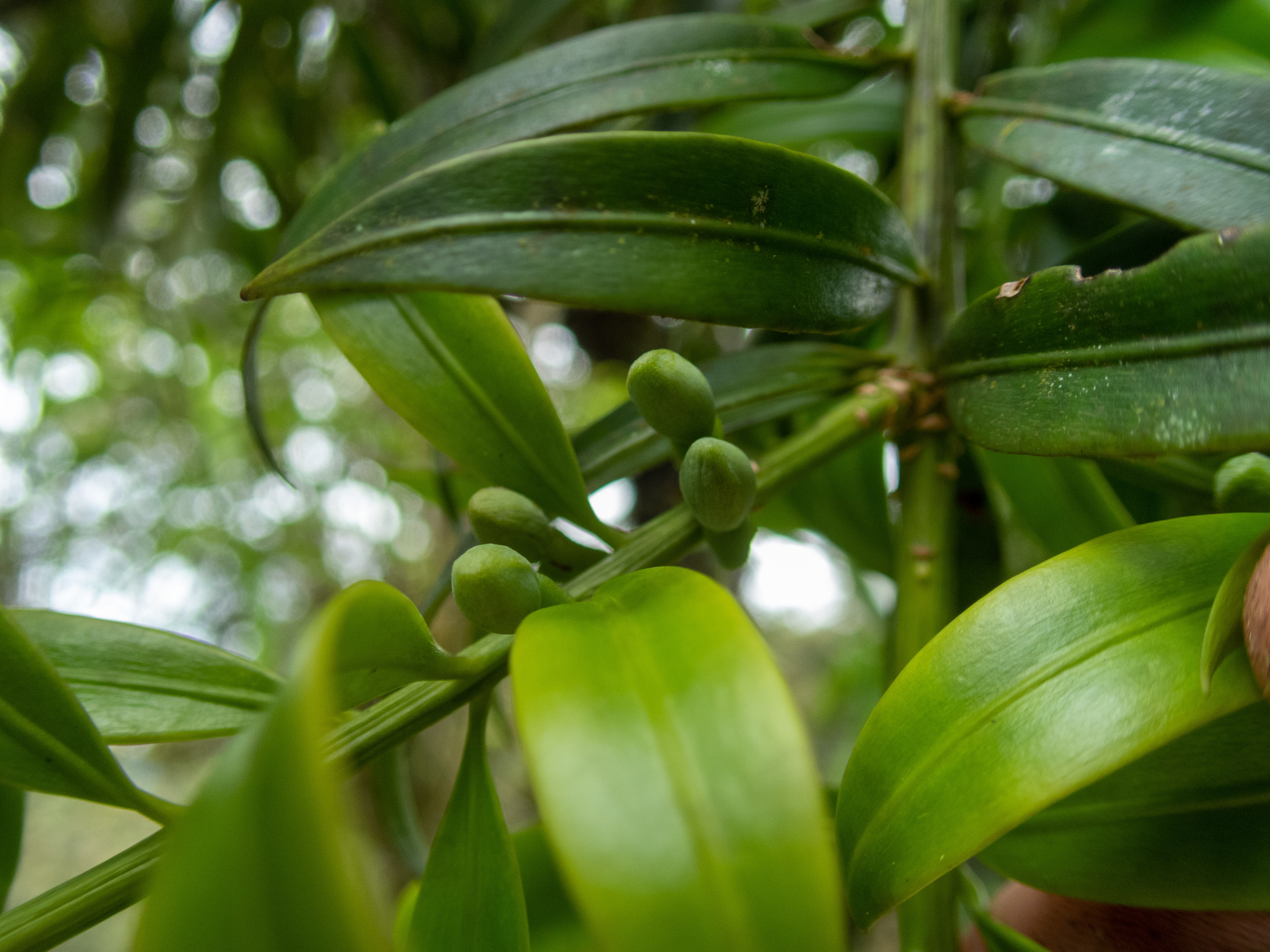

Conservation status
- Least Concern (IUCN 3.1)

Scientific classification
- Kingdom: Plantae
- Clade: Tracheophytes
- Clade: Gymnosperms
- Division: Pinophyta
- Class: Pinopsida
- Order: Araucariales
- Family: Podocarpaceae
- Genus: Podocarpus
- Species: P. guatemalensis

Binomial name
- Podocarpus guatemalensis Standl.

Synonyms
- Podocarpus allenii Standl.; Podocarpus guatemalensis subsp. allenii (Standl.) Silba; Podocarpus guatemalensis var. allenii (Standl.) J.Buchholz & N.E.Gray; Podocarpus guatemalensis subsp. pinetorum (Bartlett) Silba; Podocarpus pinetorum Bartlett

= Podocarpus guatemalensis =

Species of conifer

Podocarpus guatemalensis (British Honduras yellowwood, ocotillo de llano, cypress de montaña, cipresillo, alfajillo, pinillo, palo de oro, piño de montaña) is a species of conifer in the family Podocarpaceae.

== Distribution ==
Podocarpus guatemalensis is a shrub and/or small tree native to Guatemala and found throughout southern Mexico, Belize, Costa Rica, El Salvador, Honduras, Nicaragua and Panama in Central America, as well as in Venezuela and Colombia in northern South America.

Podocarpus guatemalensis is classified as a species of least concern on the IUCN Red List. While some populations are threatened by habitat destruction, others occur in protected areas.

The species was described by Paul Carpenter Standley in 1924.
