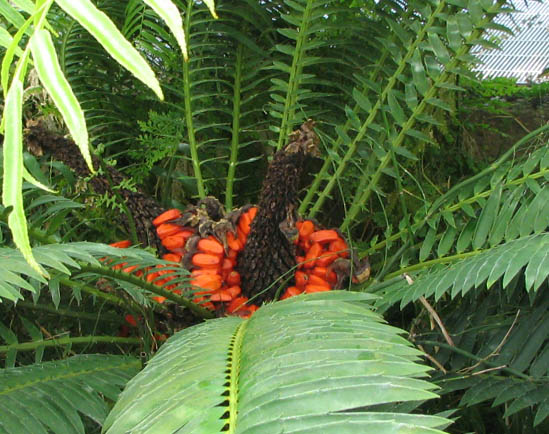
- Encephalartos lebomboensis

Scientific classification
- Kingdom: Plantae
- Clade: Embryophytes
- Clade: Tracheophytes
- Clade: Gymnosperms
- Division: Cycadophyta
- Class: Cycadopsida
- Order: Cycadales
- Suborder: Zamiineae
- Family: Zamiaceae; Horan.

Genera
- See text

Synonyms
- Stangeriaceae Schimp. & Schenk

= Zamiaceae =

Zamiaceae Temporal range: Cretaceous–Recent

Family of cycads

The Zamiaceae are a family of cycads that are superficially palm or fern-like. They are divided into two subfamilies with eight genera and about 150 species in the tropical and subtropical regions of Africa, Australia and North and South America.

The Zamiaceae, sometimes known as zamiads, are perennial, evergreen, and dioecious. They have subterranean to tall and erect, usually unbranched, cylindrical stems, and stems clad with persistent leaf bases (in Australian genera).

Their leaves are simply pinnate, spirally arranged, and interspersed with cataphylls. The leaflets are sometimes dichotomously divided. The leaflets occur with several sub-parallel, dichotomously branching longitudinal veins; they lack a mid rib. Stomata occur either on both surfaces or undersurface only.

Their roots have small secondary roots. The coralloid roots develop at the base of the stem at or below the soil surface.

Male and female sporophylls are spirally aggregated into determinate cones that grow along the axis. Female sporophylls are simple, appearing peltate, with a barren stipe and an expanded and thickened lamina with 2 (rarely 3 or more) sessile ovules inserted on the inner (axis facing) surface and directed inward. The seeds are angular, with the inner coat hardened and the outer coat fleshy. They are often brightly colored, with 2 cotyledons.

One subfamily, the Encephalartoideae, is characterized by spirally arranged sporophylls (rather than spirally orthostichous), non-articulate leaflets and persistent leaf bases. It is represented in Australia, with two genera and 40 species.

As with all cycads, members of the Zamiaceae are poisonous, producing poisonous glycosides known as cycasins.

The former family Stangeriaceae (which contained Bowenia and Stangeria) has been shown to be nested within Zamiaceae by phylogenetic analysis.

The family first began to diversify during the Cretaceous period.

- Zamiaceae
  - Diooideae
    Dioon
  - Zamioideae
    - Encephalarteae
      - Macrozamia
      - - Lepidozamia
        - Encephalartos
    - Zamieae
      - Bowenia
      - - - Ceratozamia
          - Stangeria
        - - Zamia
          - Microcycas

== Genera ==
- Dioon Lindl. (14 species)
- Macrozamia Miq. (42 species)
- Lepidozamia Lehm. (2 species)
- Encephalartos Lehm. (66 species)
- Bowenia Hook. ex Hook.f. (2 extant species)
- Ceratozamia Brongn. (27 species)
- Stangeria T.Moore (1 species)
- Zamia L. (90 species)
- Microcycas (Miq.) A.DC. (1 species)
- †Eostangeria Barthel (3 species, Cenozoic, Europe, North America)
- †Eobowenia (1 species, Early Cretaceous, Argentina)
- †Wintucycas (2 species, Late Cretaceous-Paleocene, Argentina)
- †Restrepophyllum (1 species, Early Cretaceous, Argentina)
- †Skyttegaardia (2 species Early Cretaceous, Denmark, Late Cretaceous, United States)
- †Antarcticycas (1 species Triassic, Fremouw Formation, Antarctica)
- †Dioonipites (1 species Early Eocene, USA)

== Gallery ==
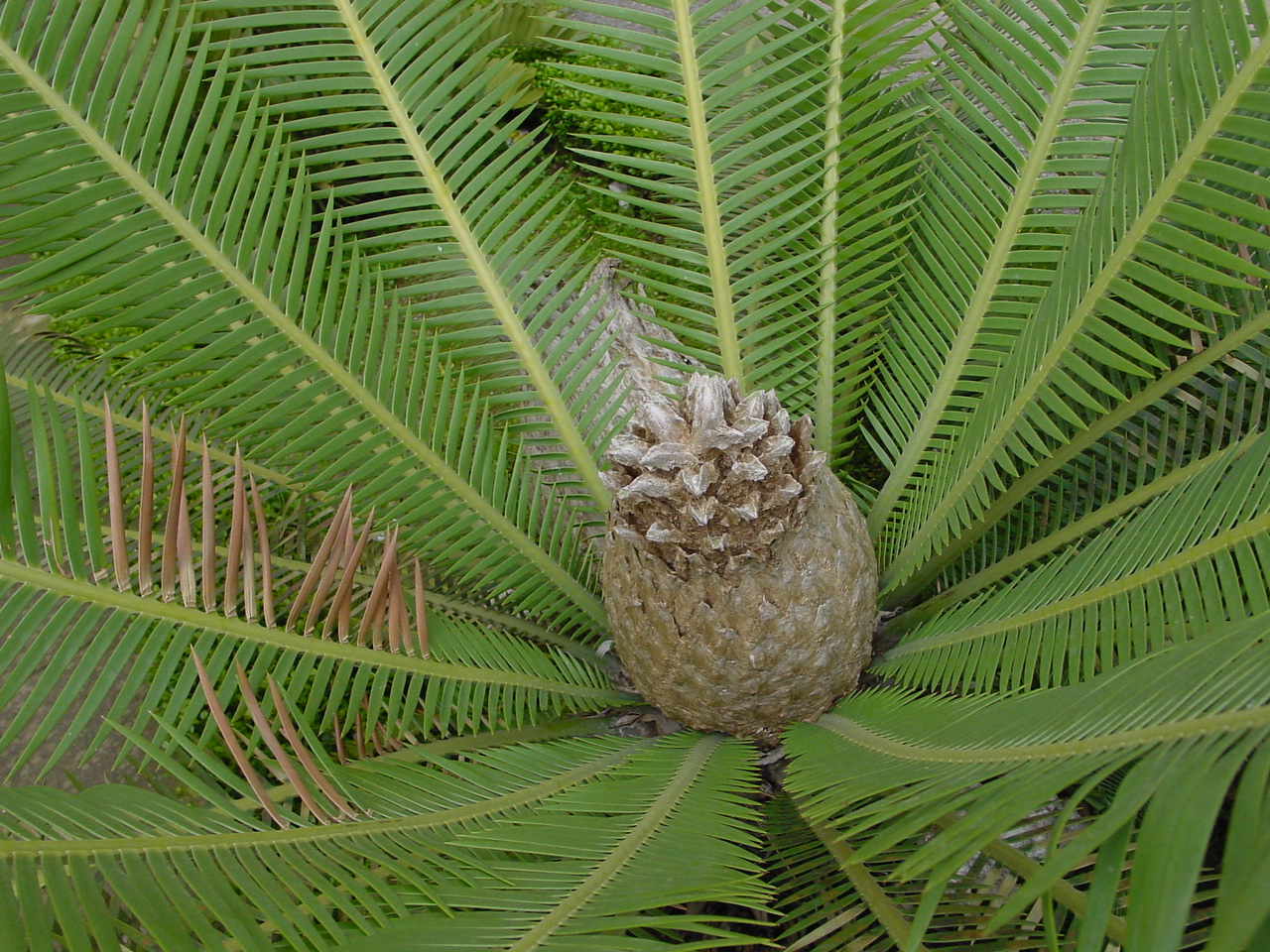
Dioon edule

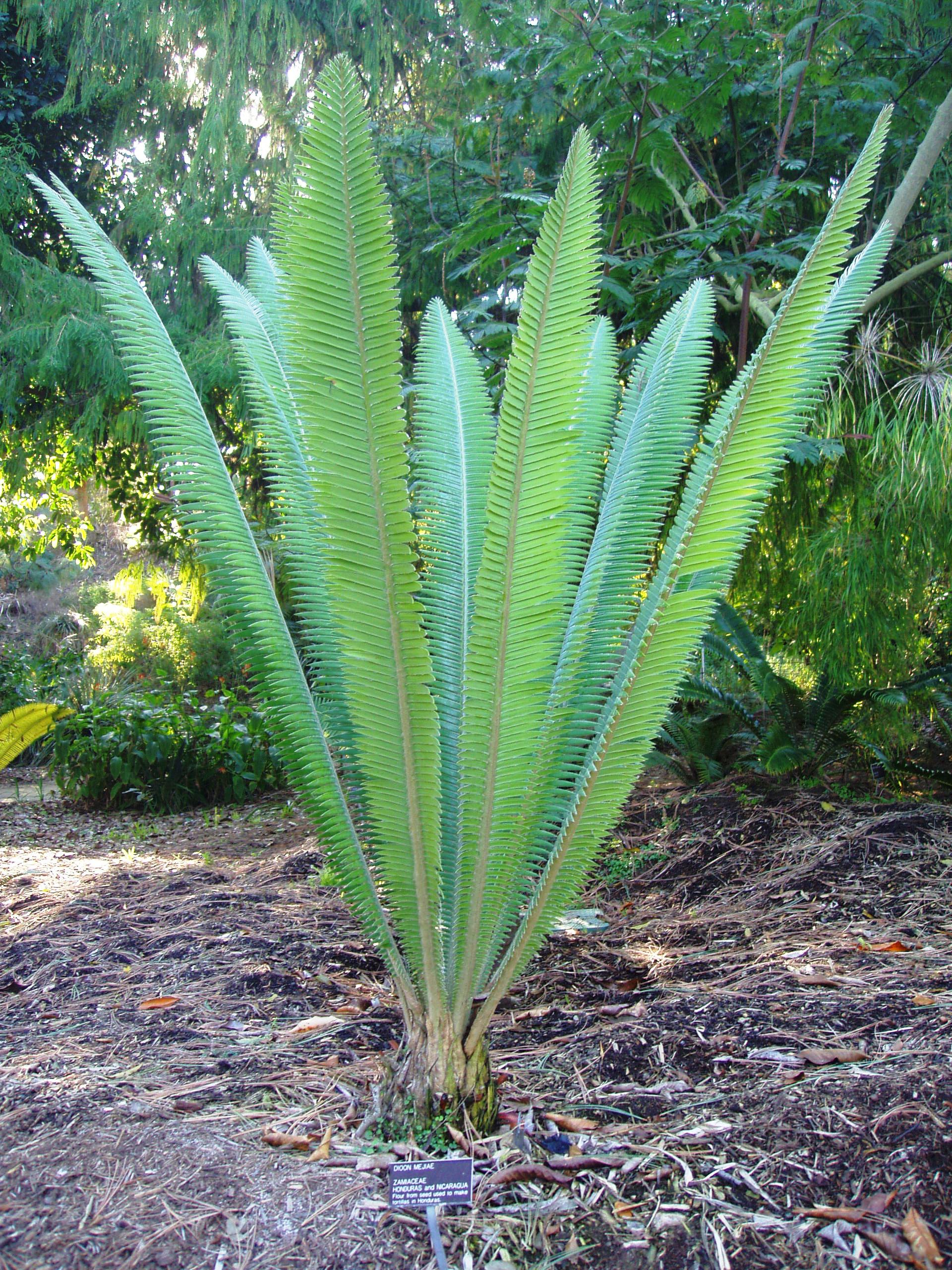
Dioon mejiae

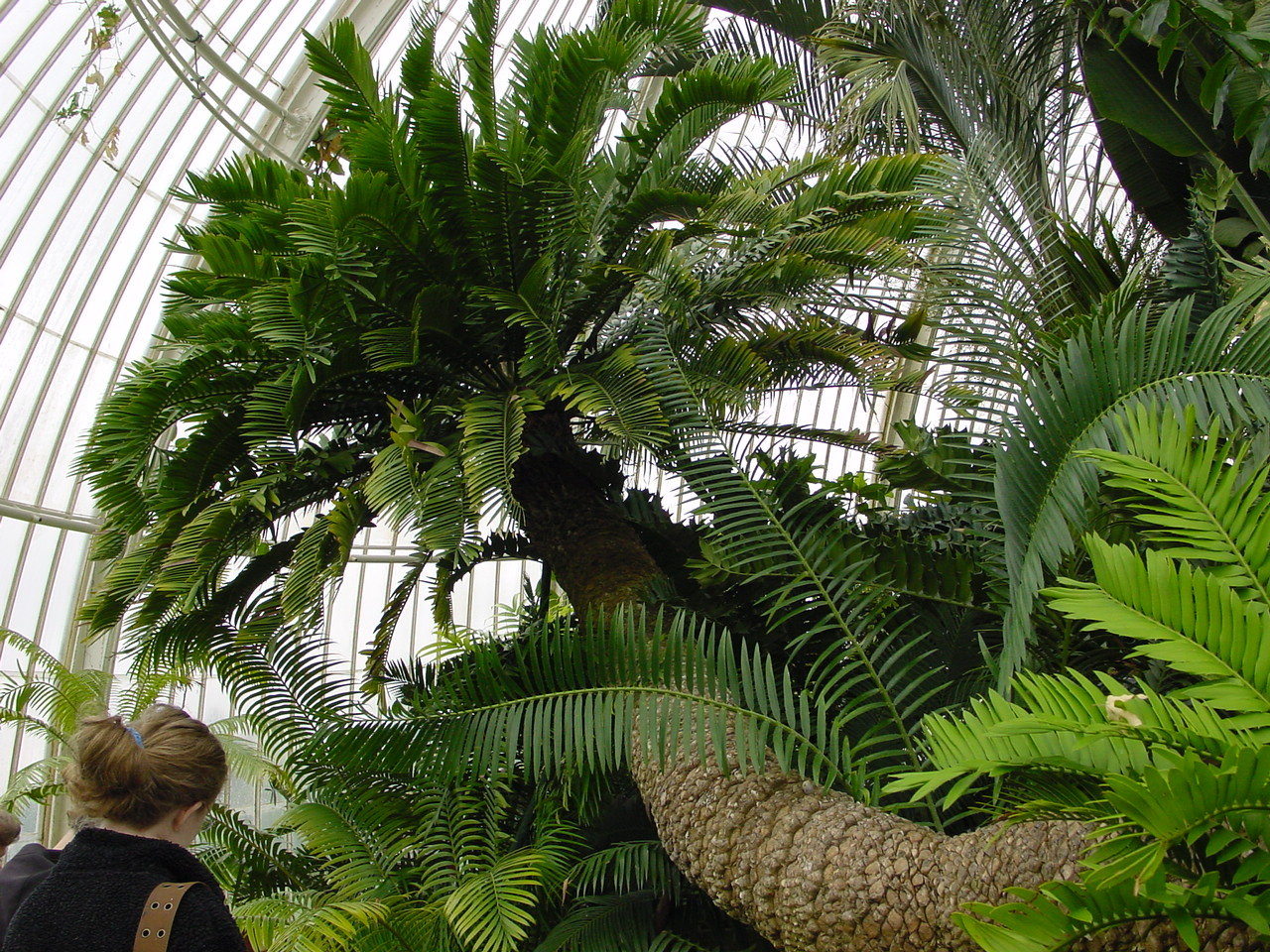
Encephalartos altensteinii

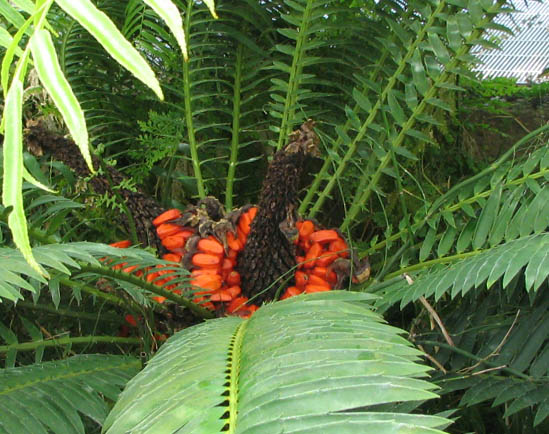
Encephalartos lebomboensis

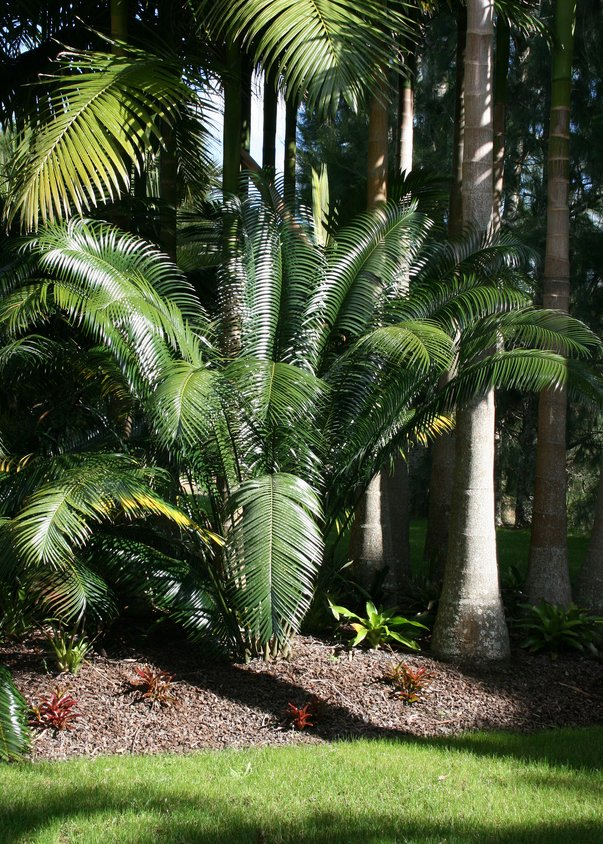
Lepidozamia peroffskyana

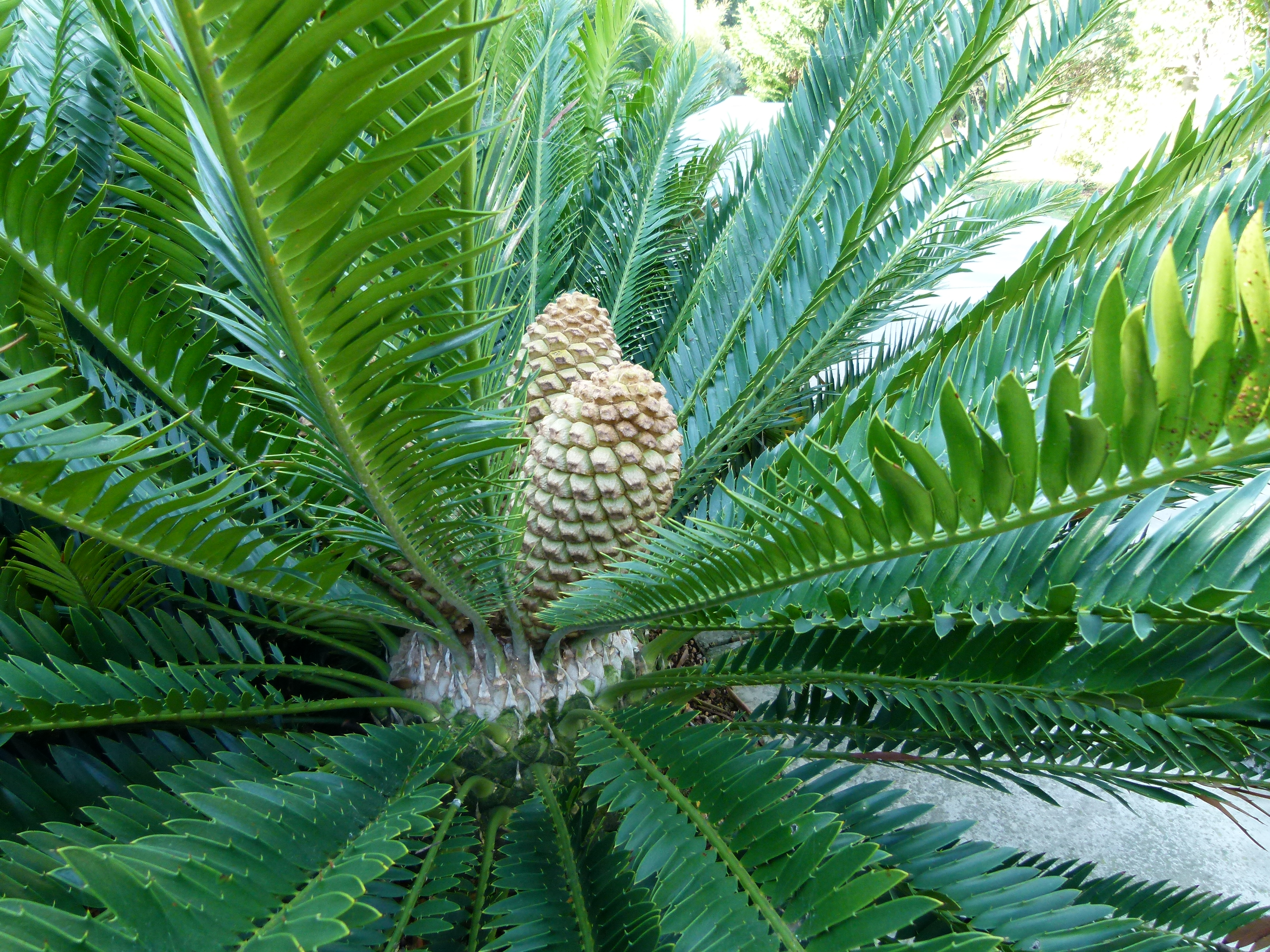
Macrozamia moorei

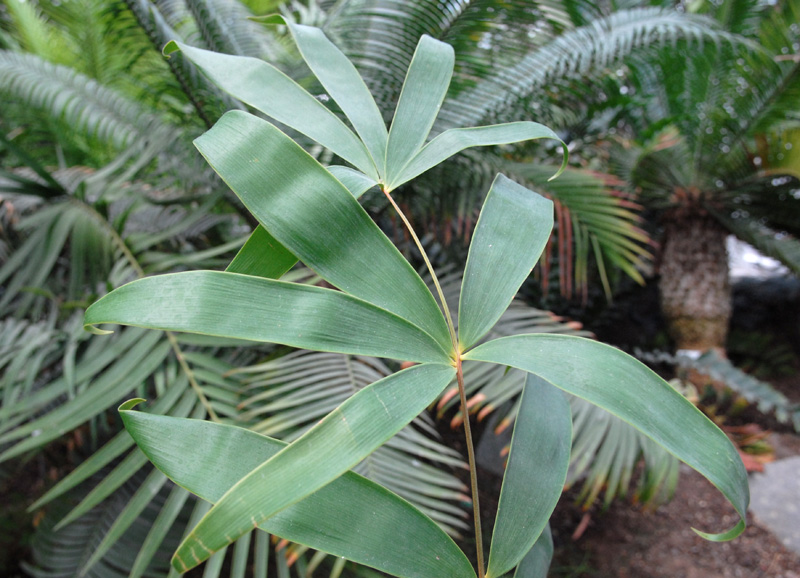
Ceratozamia hildae

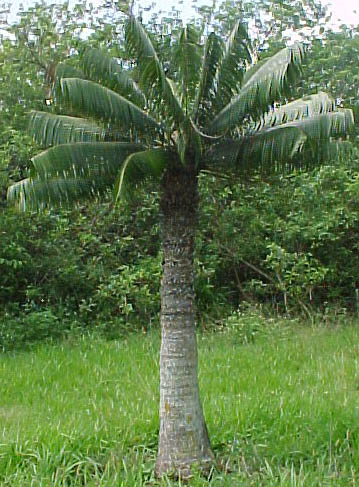
Microcycas calocoma

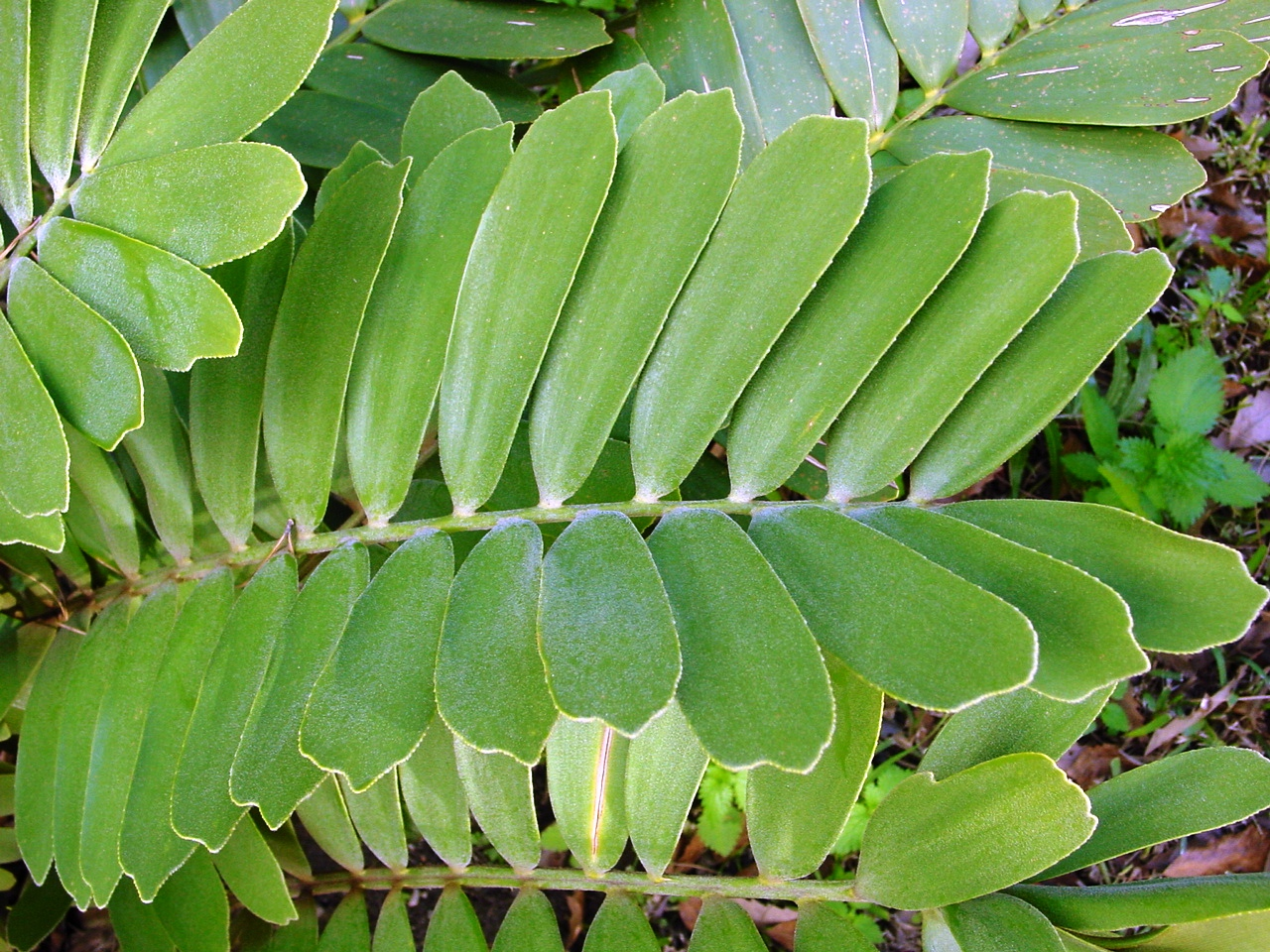
Zamia furfuracea

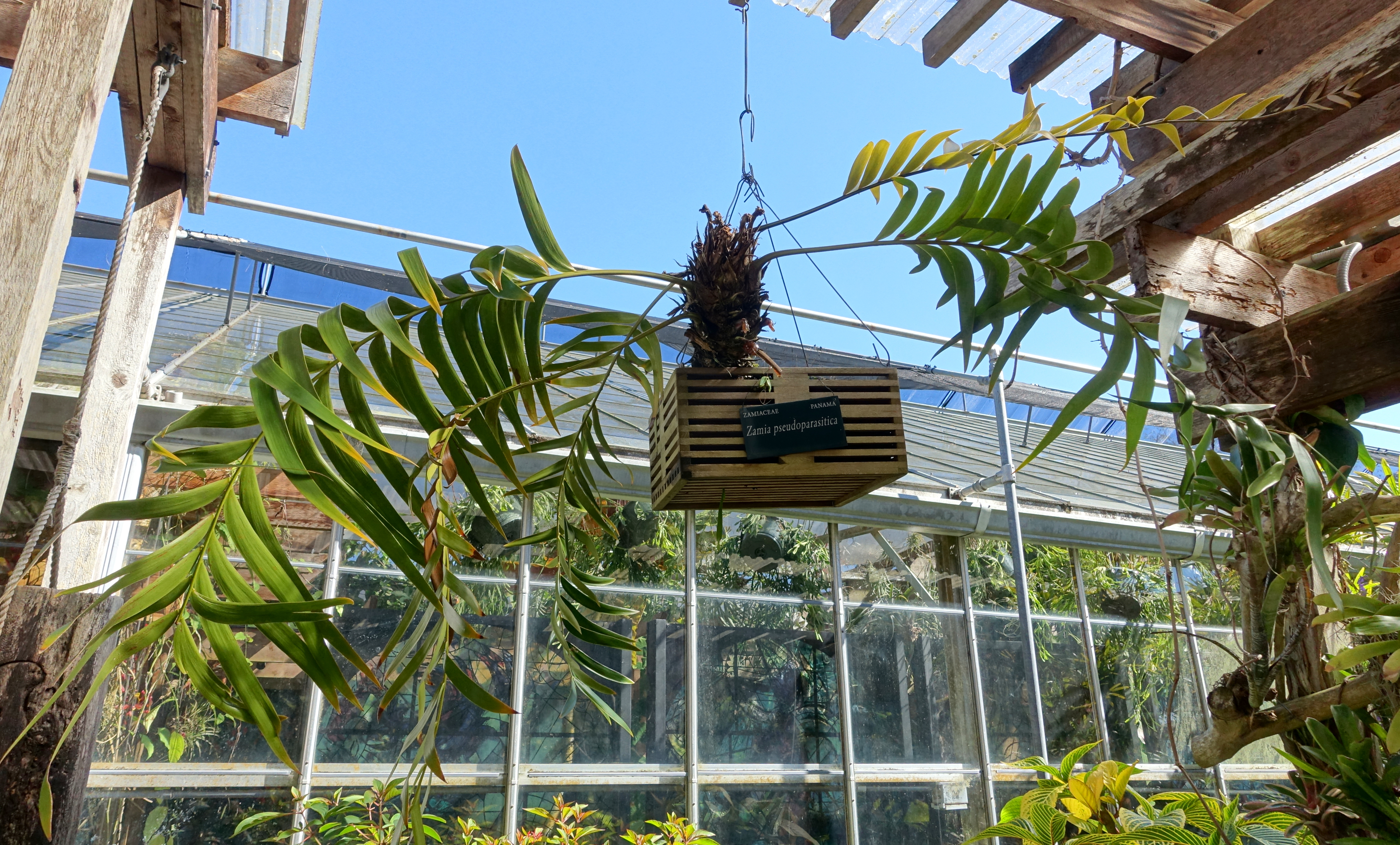
Zamia pseudoparasitica
