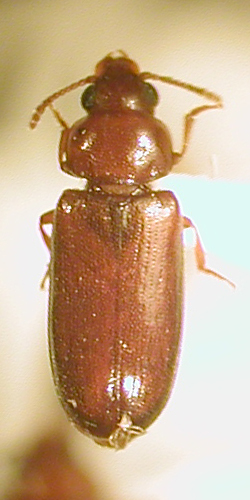
- Adult Pharaxonotha esperanzae specimen

Scientific classification
- Kingdom: Animalia
- Phylum: Arthropoda
- Clade: Pancrustacea
- Class: Insecta
- Order: Coleoptera
- Suborder: Polyphaga
- Infraorder: Cucujiformia
- Family: Erotylidae
- Subfamily: Xenoscelinae
- Genus: Pharaxonotha; Reitter, 1875

Synonyms
- Paraxonotha (lapsus)

= Pharaxonotha =

Genus of beetles

Pharaxonotha is a genus of pleasing fungus beetles in the family Erotylidae. They are variously placed in subfamily Xenoscelinae or separated in a distinct subfamily Pharaxonothinae. Similar Asian beetles formerly included here are nowadays moved to a separate genus Cycadophila.

Pharaxonotha species are found from the United States (primarily in Florida, Louisiana, and Texas), the Bahamas, Greater Antilles, Mexico, Central America, and in South America as far south as Bolivia, and also in Asia.

== Description ==
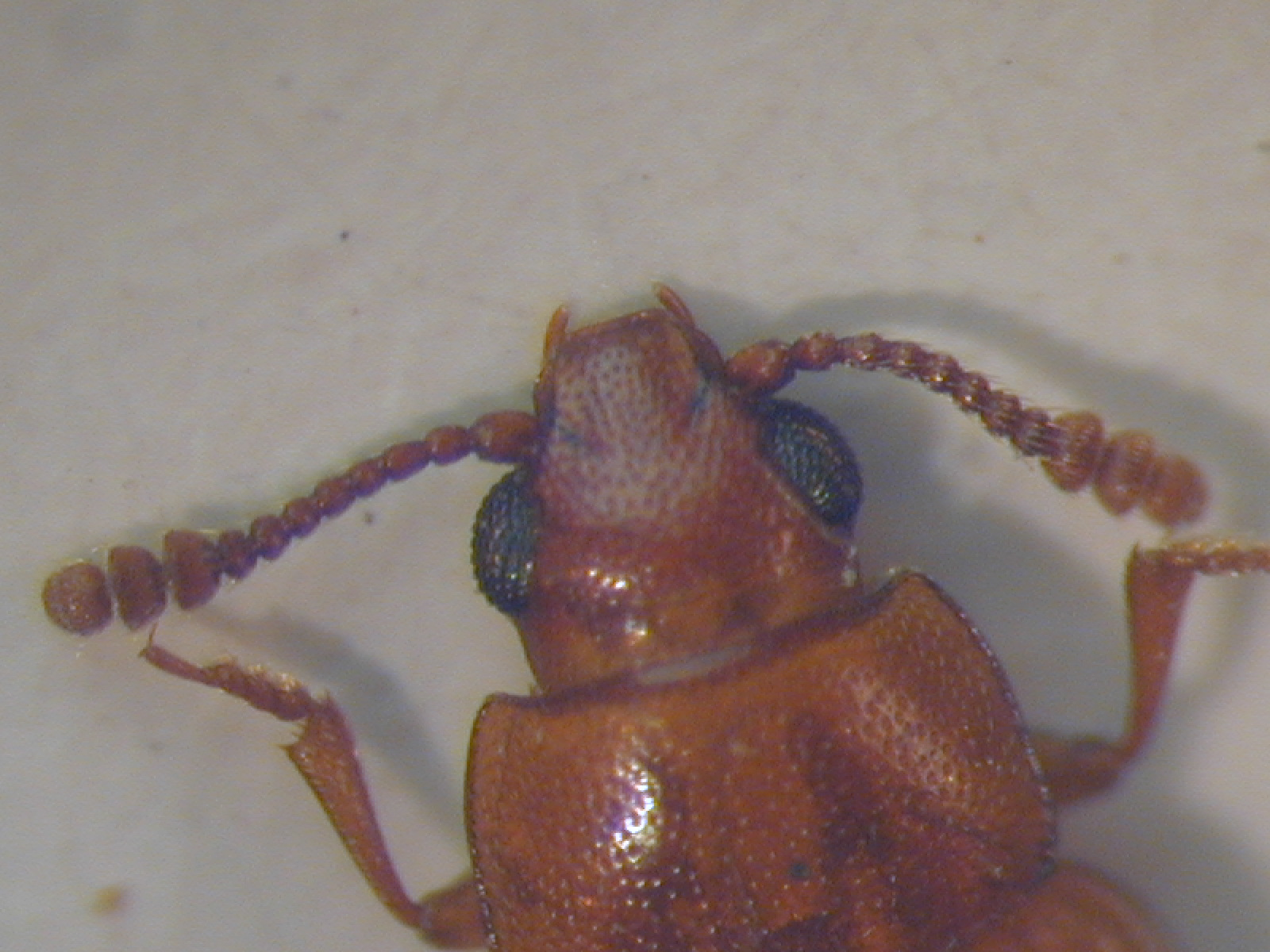
Head of P.floridana adult

Pharaxonotha are 1.59 to 5.09 millimetres (0.063 to 0.200 in) long and 0.60 to 1.89 millimetres (0.024 to 0.074 in) wide. They have large eyes and the "clubs" (enlarged ends) of their antennas have three segments. Most species are pale yellow-brown to medium brown in color, but some have elytra (the hardened fore-wings of beetles) that are black to dark-brown or with black to dark-brown spots. Differentiation between species of Pharaxonotha depends on part on details of the female genitalia.

== Ecology ==
=== Association with cycads ===
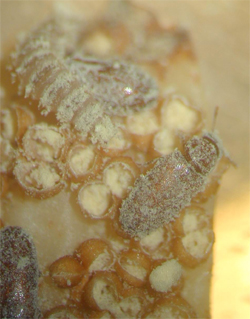
Pollen-covered adults and larva of P.esperanzae on a Microcycas calocoma microsporophyll ("pollen cone")

With the exception of Pharaxonotha kirschii, all species of Pharaxonotha are obligate symbionts of species of cycads in the Americas in the genera Ceratozamia, Dioon, Microcycas, and Zamia. (Note: Weevils of the genera Notorhopalotria, Parallocorynus, Protocorynus, and Rhopalotria in the Oxycorynini tribe are associated as pollinators with many cycads in the Dioon and Zamia genera.) The beetles live and breed in the pollen strobili (reproductive cones) of male plants (cycads are dioecious, with male and female cones on separate plants), consuming pollen and the tissues of cones. They also transfer pollen from the male plants to ovule strobili on female plants. The beetles have been associated with cycads since the early Jurassic, about 200 million years ago.

Cycads are thermogenic, capable of raising the temperature of at least some tissues. In particular, thermogeneis has been observed in the male (pollen) and female (ovule) cones (strobili) of Zamia plants. Male cones ready to shed pollen heat up early in the evening, and then cool down, while receptive female cones heat up about three hours later and then cool down. Pharaxonotha beetles have receptors for infrared radiation on their antennae, by which they appear to detect the elevated temperature of the cones on Zamia plants. Pharaxonotha beetles have been observed moving to cones on male plants when the cone's temperature is elevated, crawling into openings in the cone and emerging covered with pollen, and then moving to the cones on female plants when their temperature is elevated, again crawling into openings in the cone, presumably transferring the pollen. Each Pharaxonotha species typically pollinates just a few closely related cycad species.

=== Life cycle ===
Newly emerged adult beetles go to male cones on Zamia plants that are ready to dehisc (split open). The adults feed on pollen and lay eggs in the cones. Mating has not been observed, but presumably occurs inside the cones. Eggs are large compared to adults, and quickly hatch. The larvae also feed on pollen early on, but switch to eating cone tissues after the first couple of instars. At the end of the larval stage the larvae eat a hole through the outer layer of the cone, fall to the ground, and burrow into the soil to pupate. Adults emerge from the pupal stage in four to seven days, and then either seek out a fresh male cone or burrow into the ground, possibly until their exoskeletons harden. Late season pupae may enter diapause and remain in the soil until the next coning season.

== Species ==
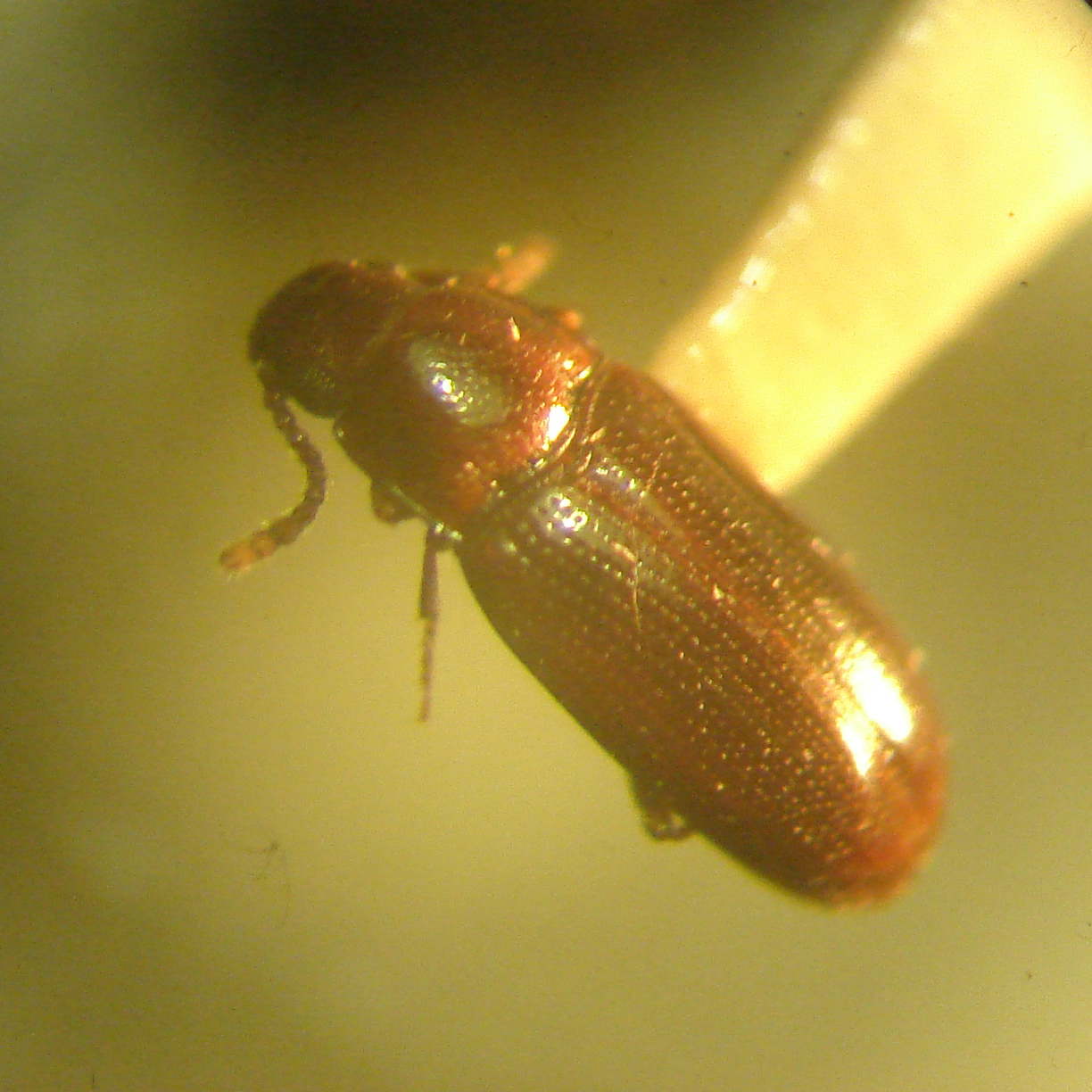
Adult specimen of Pharaxonotha kirschii

Species in the genus Pharaxonotha include:

- Pharaxonotha bicolor Skelley, Tang and Pérez-Farrera, 2022 – on Dioon califanoi, D.caputoi, and D.purpusii in northern Oaxaca and Puebla, Mexico.
- Pharaxonotha clarkorum Pakaluk, 1988 – on Zamia skinneri in Costa Rica, and on Z.hamannii, Z.nesophila, and Z.neurophyllidia in Panama.
- Pharaxonotha cerradensis Skelley & Segalla, 2019 – on Zamia boliviana in Bolivia and Brazil.
- Pharaxonotha confusa Pakaluk, 1988 – on Zamia fairchildiana in Costa Rica, and on Zamia fairchildiana and Z.pseudomonticola in Panama.
- Pharaxonotha dimorpha Skelley, Tang and Pérez-Farrera, 2022 – on Dioon edule in Veracruz, Mexico.
- Pharaxonotha esperanzae Chaves and Genaro, 2005 – on Microcycas calocoma in Cuba.
- Pharaxonotha fawcettae Skelley, Tang and Pérez-Farrera, 2022 – on the Dioon angustifolium complex in Hidalgo, Nuevo Leon, Querétaro, San Luis Potosí, and Tamaulipas, Mexico.
- Pharaxonotha floridana (Casey, 1890) (= P.zamiae) – on Zamia integrifolia in Florida.
- Pharaxonotha fortunensis Tang, Skelley and Taylor, 2024 – on Zamia lindleyi in Panama.
- Pharaxonotha gigantea Skelley, Tang and Pérez-Farrera, 2022 – on Dioon stevensonii in Guerrero, Mexico.
- Pharaxonotha holzmani Tang, Skelley and Taylor, 2024 – on Zamia imperialis and Z.skinneri in Panama.
- Pharaxonotha kirschii Reitter, 1875 – in litter on forest floors from Texas and Louisiana in the United States south to Panama and as a pest in stored foods elsewhere.
- Pharaxonotha manicatae Tang, Skelley and Taylor, 2024 – on Zamia manicata in Panama.
- Pharaxonotha mexicana Santiago-Jiménez, 2019 – on Ceratozamia tenuis in Veracruz, Mexico.
- Pharaxonotha novoai Skelley, Tang and Pérez-Farrera, 2022 – on Dioon tomasellii in Jalisco, Mexico.
- Pharaxonotha occidentalis Skelley, Tang and Pérez-Farrera, 2022 – on Dioon holmgrenii and D.merolae in western Oaxaca and Chiapas, Mexico.
- Pharaxonotha panamensis Tang, Skelley and Taylor, 2024 – on Zamia dressleri, Z.elegantissima, Z.nana, Z.obliqua, and Z.stevensonii in Panama.
- Pharaxonotha perezi Tang & Gomez Dominguez, 2022 – on Ceratozamia santillanii in Chiapas, Mexico.
- Pharaxonotha portophylla Franz and Skelley, 2008 – on Zamia erosa and Z.portoricensis in Puerto Rico.
- Pharaxonotha pseudoparasitica Tang, Skelley and Taylor, 2024 – on Zamia pseudoparasitica in Panama.
- Pharaxonotha sclerotiza Skelley, Tang and Pérez-Farrera, 2022 – on Dioon angustifolium in Tamaulipas, Mexico.
- Pharaxonotha taylori Skelley and Tang, 2020 – on Zamia cunaria and Z.ipetiensis in Panama.
- Pharaxonotha tenuis Santiago-Jiménez, 2019 – on Ceratozamia tenuis in Veracruz, Mexico.
- Pharaxonotha thomasi Skelley and Tang, 2020 – on Zamia onan-reyesii in Honduras.
- Pharaxonotha vovidesi Skelley, Tang and Pérez-Farrera, 2022 – on Dioon edule in Veracruz, Mexico.
- Pharaxonotha woodruffi Skelley, Tang and Pérez-Farrera, 2022 – on Dioon holmgrenii, D.merolae, and D.tomasellii, in Chiapas, Jalisco and western and southern Oaxaca, Mexico.
