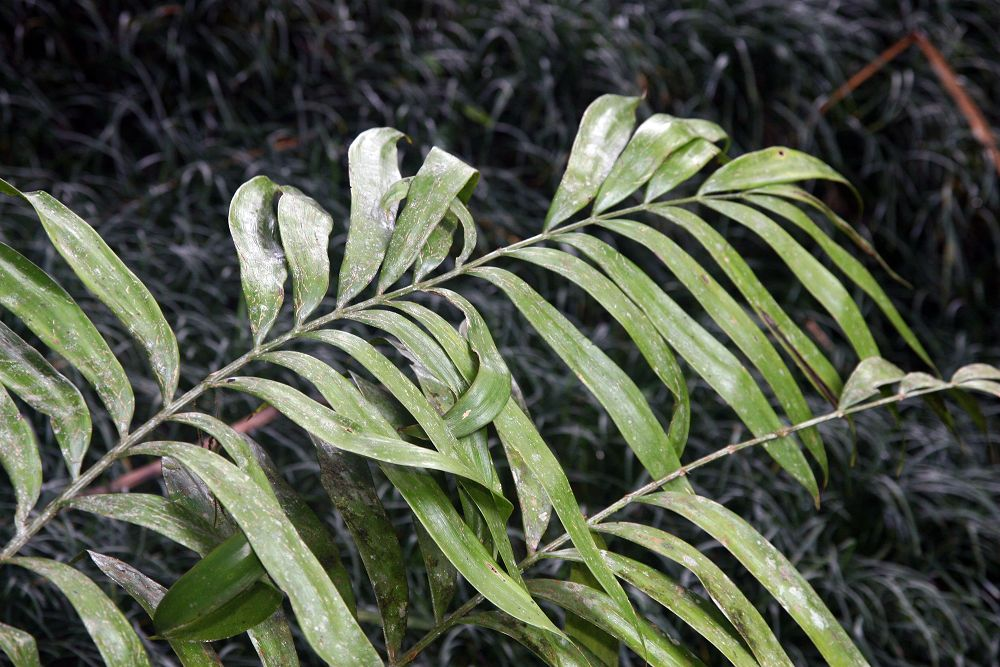

Conservation status
- Vulnerable (IUCN 3.1)

Scientific classification
- Kingdom: Plantae
- Clade: Embryophytes
- Clade: Tracheophytes
- Clade: Gymnosperms
- Division: Cycadophyta
- Class: Cycadopsida
- Order: Cycadales
- Family: Zamiaceae
- Genus: Zamia
- Species: Z. acuminata

Binomial name
- Zamia acuminata Oerst.ex Dyer

= Zamia acuminata =

Species of cycad

Zamia acuminata is a species of plant in the family Zamiaceae which is threatened by habitat loss. It is found in Costa Rica and Panama.

The holotype of Zamia acuminata is a leaf collected by Anders Sandøe Ørsted in Costa Rica or Nicaragua between 1846 and 1848. It was described by William Turner Thiselton-Dyer in 1884. While the label with the specimen has the note ad flumen S. Juan Nicaragua on it, suggesting that the leaf was collected near the San Juan River in southern Nicaragua, no other specimens of the plant have been found in Nicaragua or adjacent parts of Costa Rica. In 1993, Dennis Stevenson published a description of Z. acuminata based on plants growing wild in Panama.

== Phylogeny ==
Phylogenitic trees published by Calaonje et al. and by Lindstrom et al. place Z. acuminata in the Isthmus clade of Zamia. Calonje et al. further place it in the Acuminata clade, consisting of Z. acuminata, Z. fairchildiana, Z. pseudomonticola, and Z. nana. Stevenson places Z. acuminata, Z. fairchildiana, and Z. pseudomonticola in a clade based on leaflet and reproductive morphology (biology). In a study of leaflet structure in Z. acuminata and Z. pseudomonticola, Acuña-Castillo and Marín-Méndez note the two species share a number of adaptations for xeric environments, as well as adaptations for mesic, high humidity environments. They also note the close resemblance to the two species of the leaflet structures of Z. fairchildiana. The authors suggest that the three species are closely related and have diverged recently.

== Description ==
Z. acuminata has a subterranean stem that is subglobose (rounded but not spherical) to cylindrical, up to 5 centimetres (2.0 in) in diameter. (Note: Stevenson notes that Z. acuminata plants in cultivation have been reported to have upright stems up to 1 metre (3 ft 3 in) tall. Stevenson suggest that such plants are confined in pots, and the roots are therefore unable to pull the stem under the soil surface. All Z. acuminata plants observed in the wild have underground stems.) It has one to three compound leaves that are up to 1 metre (3 ft 3 in) long. Leaf stalks are up to 60 centimetres (24 in) long, and densely covered with prickles. The leaf axis has 6 to 15 pairs of leaflets, with some prickles in the lower third of the axis. The leaflets are elliptic-lanceolate with very long acuminate (pointed) tips. Leaflets in the middle of the compound leaf are 20 to 30 centimetres (7.9 to 11.8 in) long and 1 to 3 centimetres (0.39 to 1.18 in) wide.

Like all Zamia, Z. acuminata is dioecious, with all plants either male or female. Male strobili (cones) are cylindrical, 5 to 8 centimetres (2.0 to 3.1 in) long and 1 to 1.5 centimetres (0.39 to 0.59 in) in diameter, and are cream to tan in color. Female strobili are cylindrical to ovoid, 10 to 20 centimetres (3.9 to 7.9 in) long and 5 to 8 centimetres (2.0 to 3.1 in) in diameter, and are also cream to tan in color. The seeds are ovoid and red.

== Distribution ==
Z. acuminata is found between 400 and 1,200 metres (1,300 and 3,900 ft) of altitude in Costa Rica and Panama.

== Sources ==
- Acuña-Castillo, Rafael; Marín-Méndez, Walter (June 2013). "Comparative anatomy of leaflets of Zamia acuminata and Z. pseudomonticola (Zamiaceae) in Costa Rica". Revista de Biología Tropical. 61 (2): 539–546. doi:10.15517/rbt.v61i2.11146. ISSN 0034-7744. PMID 23885572.
- Calonje, Michael; Meerow, Alan W.; Griffith, M. Patrick; Sala-Leiva, Dayana; Vovides, Andrew P.; Ciro, Mario; Francisco-Ortega, Javier (May 2019). "A Time-Calibrated Species Tree Phylogeny of the New World Cycad Genus Zamia L. (Zamiaceae, Cycadyles)". International Journal of Plant Sciences. 180 (4): 271–355. Bibcode:2019IJPlS.180..286C. doi:10.1086/702642.
- Lindström, Anders J.; Calonje, Michael; Stevenson, Dennis; Husby, Chad; Taylor, Alberto (2013). "Clarification of Zamia acuminata and a new Zamia Species from Cocle Province, Panama" (PDF). Phytotaxa. 98 (2): 27–42. Bibcode:2013Phytx..98...27L. doi:10.11646/phytotaxa.98.2.1. ISSN 1179-3155.
- Lindstrom, Anders; Nabib, Sadaf; Dong, Shanshan; Dong, Yiqing; Liu, Jiang; Calonje, Michael; Stevenson, Dennis; Zhang, Shouzhou (2024). "Transcriptome sequencing data provide a solid base to understand phylogenetic relationships, biogeography and reticulated evolution of the genus Zamia L. (Cycadales, Zamiaceae)". Annals of Botany. XX (5): 747–768. doi:10.1093/aob/mcae065. PMC 11560380. PMID 38900840.
- Stevenson, Dennis Wm. (1993-01-01). "The Zamiaceae in Panama with comments on phytogeography and species relationships". Brittonia. 45 (1): 1–16. Bibcode:1993Britt..45....1S. doi:10.2307/2806850. ISSN 1938-436X. JSTOR 2806850.
