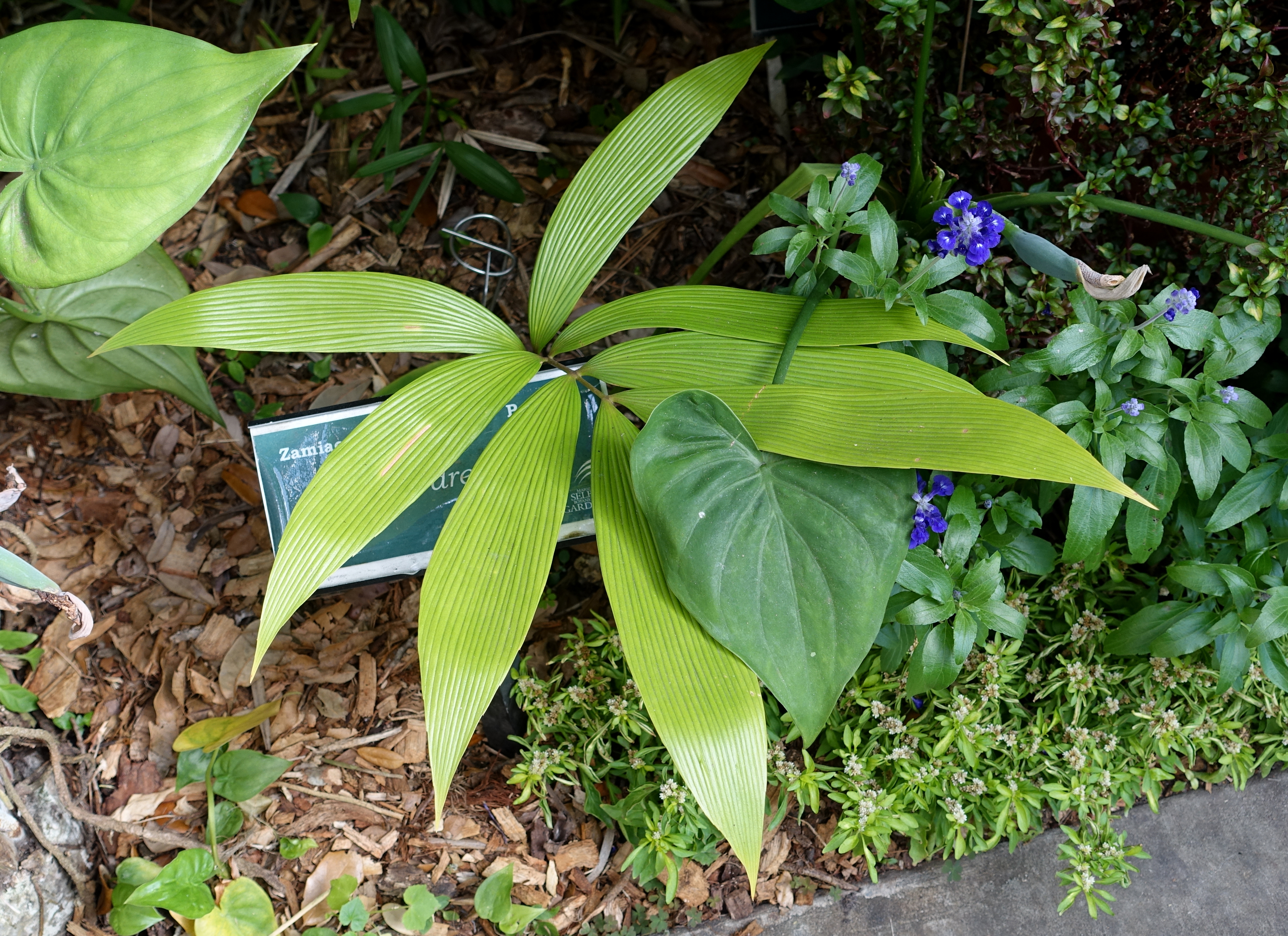

Conservation status
- Endangered (IUCN 3.1)

Scientific classification
- Kingdom: Plantae
- Clade: Tracheophytes
- Clade: Gymnosperms
- Division: Cycadophyta
- Class: Cycadopsida
- Order: Cycadales
- Family: Zamiaceae
- Genus: Zamia
- Species: Z. dressleri

Binomial name
- Zamia dressleri D.W. Stev.

= Zamia dressleri =

Species of cycad

Zamia dressleri is a species of plant in the family Zamiaceae. It is endemic to Eastern Panama, where it grows in rainforest habitat.

== Etymology ==
The specific epithet dressleri recognizes Robert Louis Dressler, a botanist who worked in Panama and was the first to recognize the species as distinct from other Zamias.

== Phylogenetic history ==
The two populations of Zamia dressleri were previously identified as Z. skinneri. Based on Strobilus (cone) morphology and growth habit, Z. dressleri and Z. wallisii have been placed in a clade. Z. dressleri has also been associated with the Z. skinneri species complex. A molecular phylogenetics study in 2019 using DNA and one in 2024 using transcriptomes found Z. dressleri to be sister to the Z. obliqua clade rather than the Z. skinneri clade. (The Z. obliqua clade includes Z. elegantissima and Z. stevensonii.)

== Description ==
The stem of Zamia dressleri is subterranean and 3 to 5 centimetres (1.2 to 2.0 in) in diameter. Cataphylls are ovate, 1 to 2 centimetres (0.39 to 0.79 in) long, and 2 to 3 centimetres (0.79 to 1.18 in) wide. The stem apex usually has one compound-leaf, although up to three may occur. The leaves are 0.5 to 1.5 metres (1 ft 8 in to 4 ft 11 in) long, with a 0.3 to 1 metre (1 ft 0 in to 3 ft 3 in) long petiole (leaf stalk). There are two to five pairs of leaflets on the rachis (mid-rib) of the leaf. The petiole is sparsely to densely covered with prickles, and the lower third of the rachis may have a few prickles. The leaflets are elliptical, cuneate (wedge-shaped) at the base and pointed at the apex. the outer third of the leaflet edges are toothed. Leaflets on the middle of the leaf are 30 to 50 centimetres (12 to 20 in) long and 12 to 15 centimetres (4.7 to 5.9 in) wide.

Like all cycads, Zamia dressleri is dioecious, having plants that are either male or female. Male strobili are cylindrical to elongate-cylindrical, 5 to 8 centimetres (2.0 to 3.1 in) long, 1 to 2 centimetres (0.39 to 0.79 in) in diameter, and cream to tan in color. Female strobili are ovoid-cylindrical, 10 to 15 centimetres (3.9 to 5.9 in) long, 3 to 4 centimetres (1.2 to 1.6 in) in diameter, and wine-red to dark red-brown in color. The female strobili stand on short peduncles (stalks). Seeds are ovoid, 1 to 1.5 centimetres (0.39 to 0.59 in) in diameter, and red in color.

== Habitat ==
Zamia dressleri is endemic to two small populations in Panama, in Colón Province and the comarca indígena of Guna Yala.

== Sources ==
- Calonje, Michael; Meerow, Alan W.; Griffith, M. Patrick; Salas-Leiva, Dayana; Vovides, Andrew P.; Coiro, Mario; Francisco-Ortega, Javier (May 2019). "A Time-Calibrated Species Tree Phylogeny of the New World Cycad Genus Zamia L. (Zamiaceae, Cycadales)". International Journal of Plant Sciences. 180 (4): 286–314. Bibcode:2019IJPlS.180..286C. doi:10.1086/702642. ISSN 1058-5893.
- Lindstrom, Anders; Habib, Sadaf; Dong, Shanshan; Gong, Yiqing; Liu, Jian; Calonje, Michael; Stevenson, Dennis; Zhang, Shouzhou (November 2024). "Transcriptome sequencing data provide a solid base to understand the phylogenetic relationships, biogeography and reticulated evolution of the genus Zamia L. (Cycadales: Zamiaceae)". Annals of Botany. 134 (5): 747–768. doi:10.1093/aob/mcae065. ISSN 0305-7364. PMC 11560380. PMID 38900840.
- Stevenson, Dennis Wm. (January 1993). "The Zamiaceae in Panama with Comments on Phytogeography and Species Relationships". Brittonia. 45 (1): 1–16. Bibcode:1993Britt..45....1S. doi:10.2307/2806850. JSTOR 2806850.
- Taylor B., Alberto S.; Haynes, Jody L.; Holzman, Greg (November 2008). "Taxonomical, nomenclatural and biogeographical revelations in the Zamia skinneri complex of Central America (Cycadales: Zamiaceae)". Botanical Journal of the Linnean Society. 158 (3): 399–429. doi:10.1111/j.1095-8339.2008.00886.x. ISSN 0024-4074.
