= Zamia brasiliensis =

Scientific classification
- Kingdom: Plantae
- Clade: Tracheophytes
- Clade: Gymnospermae
- Division: Cycadophyta
- Class: Cycadopsida
- Order: Cycadales
- Family: Zamiaceae
- Genus: Zamia
- Species: Z. brasiliensis

Binomial name
- Zamia brasiliensis Calonje & Segalla

Species of cycad

Zamia brasiliensis is a species of plant in the family Zamiaceae, found in Mato Grosso and Rondônia states in Brazil. It is morphologically similar to Z. boliviana and Z. ulei, which are found in ranges that are adjacent to, but do not overlap, that of Z. brasiliensis, in the Amazon basin. It is found in several locations across its range, but is threatened by widespread clearances of forest being converted to cattle pastures.

== Description ==
Zamia brasiliensis has an in-ground globose to cylindrical stem 6.4 to 25 centimetres (2.5 to 9.8 in) long and 6.2 to 8.4 centimetres (2.4 to 3.3 in) in diameter. There are one to six compound-leaves on a crown. Emergent leaves are light-green. Mature leaves are 10 to 112 centimetres (3.9 to 44.1 in) long and dull greyish- to bright-green. The petiole (stalk) is 10.5 to 61.2 centimetres (4.1 to 24.1 in) long and the leaf axis is 0.1 to 54.5 centimetres (0.039 to 21.457 in) long. Both are smooth, with no prickles. There are 2 to 24 leaflets on a leaf which are lanceolate to obovate in shape with strongly serrated edges towards the ends. Leaflets in the middle of the leaf are 16.7 to 21 centimetres (6.6 to 8.3 in) long and 2.4 to 3.5 centimetres (0.94 to 1.38 in) wide.

Like all Zamias, Zamia brasiliensis is dioecious, with each plant being either male or female. There are up to three male strobili (cones) on the crown of a male plant. They are cylindrical-conical, 12.8 centimetres (5.0 in) long, 1.9 centimetres (0.75 in) in diameter, and covered with yellow-cream hairs. They sit on peduncles (stalks) that are 3.8 to 4.0 centimetres (1.5 to 1.6 in) tall, cream colored and covered with orange-brown hairs. There are usually one but can be as many as female cones on the crown of a female plant, which are erect, cylindrical, 8 to 11.5 centimetres (3.1 to 4.5 in) tall, 8 to 9.8 centimetres (3.1 to 3.9 in) in diameter, and covered with yellow and orange-brown hairs. The cones are beige-green when they first emerge, turning orange-brown when receptive to pollen. The female cones sit on peduncles that are 10 to 26 centimetres (3.9 to 10.2 in) long, 0.5 to 0.6 centimetres (0.20 to 0.24 in) in diameter, and covered with brown hairs. Seeds are ovoid to ovoid-pyramidal, 11.9 to 16.6 millimetres (0.47 to 0.65 in) long and 7.1 to 9.3 millimetres (0.28 to 0.37 in) in diameter. The sarcotesta (pulpy seed coat) on mature seeds is paper thin and orange-red.

The species name brasiliensis refers to the fact that at the time of description this was the only known species of Zamia endemic to Brazil.

== Habitat and distribution ==
Zamia brasiliensis grows in equatorial savanna with dry winter. Strobili (cones) develop from September to December, with pollination occurring from October to December. Seeds are released from June through September. New leaves emerge from August to November. An unidentified species of beetle in the genus Pharaxonotha, a potential pollinator, was identified as living with one population of Z. brasiliensis. In another population, larvae of a butterfly in the genus Eumaeus were feeding on the leaves of Z. brasiliensis. The species grows in the transition zone between the Brazilian Cerrado and the Amazon rainforest in upland areas of Mato Grosso and Rondônia states in Brazil. Specific habitats include dense and open ombrophilous forests, semideciduous and deciduous forests, and woodland savannas.

Zamia brasiliensis has been found in ten locations within a broad area, but the distribution is entirely in the "Arc of Deforestation", a part of the Amazon forest being cleared for conversion to pasture. As of 2017, 34% of the habitat area had been converted to pasture. One population is in Parque Estadual Cristalino, a state park in Mato Grosso, but the remaining populations are fragmented and threatened by forest clearances. Segalla and Calonje recommended that the IUCN list Z. brasiliensis as Endangered on the Red List, but as of January 2025, IUCN had not rated it.

== Similar species ==
The morphology of Zamia brasiliensis is similar to that of Z. boliviana and Z. ulei, which are found in the Amazon basin in ranges that are adjacent to, but do not overlap, that of Z. brasiliensis. Z. ulei is found in a large area including much of western Brazil, northernmost Bolivia, eastern Peru, eastern Ecuador, southern Colombia, and southern Venezuela. Z. brasiliensis plants have often been misidentified as Z. ulei, likely because the leaves of Z. brasiliensis plants resemble those of young Z. ulei plants in size and shape, but Z. ulei grows much larger than Z. brasiliensis. In addition, the petioles of Z. ulei are armed with prickles, while those of Z. brasiliensis are smooth.

Zamia brasiliensis and Z. boliviana are likely closely related, sharing many characteristics. They both lack prickles on their pedicles, a rare trait in mainland Zamia (i.e., aside from the Florida/Caribbean clade, and have broadly similar strobili (reproductive cones). However, leaflets on Z. brasiliensis are much wider than on Z. boliviana, and there are consistent diagnostic distinctions in the cones. Z. boliviana is found in central, northern and eastern Bolivia, and in adjacent parts of Brazil, with no overlap in range with Z. brasiliensis.

== Sources ==
- Segalla, Rosane; Calonje, Michael (2019-05-16). "Zamia brasiliensis, a new species of Zamia (Zamiaceae, Cycadales) from Mato Grosso and Rondônia, Brazil". Phytotaxa. 404 (1): 1–11. doi:10.11646/phytotaxa.404.1.1. ISSN 1179-3163.
