= Zamia stevensonii =

Conservation status
- Endangered (IUCN 3.1)

Scientific classification
- Kingdom: Plantae
- Clade: Embryophytes
- Clade: Tracheophytes
- Clade: Spermatophytes
- Clade: Gymnospermae
- Division: Cycadophyta
- Class: Cycadopsida
- Order: Cycadales
- Family: Zamiaceae
- Genus: Zamia
- Species: Z. stevensonii

Binomial name
- Zamia stevensonii A.S.Taylor & G.Holzman

Species of cycad

Zamia stevensonii (blanco) is a species of cycad in the family Zamiaceae. It is found in the vicinity of the Panama Canal and the Chagres River in central Panama.

Z. stevensonii was described in 2012 by Taylor Blake & Holzman from plants that had previously been identified as variously belonging to Z. elegantissima, Z. fairchildiana, and Z. pseudomonticola. While Z. stevensonii and Z. elegantissima in particular are similar, the authors found sufficient differences in vegetative and reproductive structures and in pollinators to separate Z. stevensonii from the other three species. The specific name srevensonii honors Dennis W. Stevenson, who has worked extensively on cycads in Panama and elsewhere in the Americas. The common name, also used in the horticultural trade, is blanco, because the emergent leaves are white.

== Description ==
The stem is usually upright but occasionally underground, and may be up to 1.5 metres (4 ft 11 in) tall and 2 to 8 centimetres (0.79 to 3.15 in) in diameter. There are up to 27 (mean is 11) compound leaves on a plant. The leaves are 25 to 120 centimetres (9.8 to 47.2 in) long, on a 28 to 63 centimetres (11 to 25 in) long stalk, with few or no prickles on stalk or leaf. Leaves emerge white and mature to glossy or dark green. There are 3 to 25 pairs of leaflets on a leaf. Leaflets are oblong, 10 to 25 centimetres (3.9 to 9.8 in) long and 2 to 5 centimetres (0.79 to 1.97 in) wide at the middle of the compound leaf.

Z. stevensonii is, like all Zamias, dioecious, with each plant being either male or female. There are one to three male microstrobili (male cones) on a plant. The male cones are 5.5 to 17 centimetres (2.2 to 6.7 in) long and 2.5 to 4 centimetres (0.98 to 1.57 in) in diameter. They are reddish-golden to brownish-yellow in color, covered with hairs, cylindrical to elongate conical-cylindrical, and held on stalks 4 to 10 centimetres (1.6 to 3.9 in) long and 0.5 to 2 centimetres (0.20 to 0.79 in) in diameter. The is one, or rarely two, macrostrobili (female cones) on a female plant. The macrostrobili are 4.5 to 16 centimetres (1.8 to 6.3 in) long and 4 to 9 centimetres (1.6 to 3.5 in) in diameter. They emerge yellow-brown in color, maturing to green or greyish-green, covered with tan to brown hairs. The macrostrobili are cylindrical to clylindrical-globose, held on stalks up to 10 centimetres (3.9 in) long and 0.5 to 3 centimetres (0.20 to 1.18 in) in diameter. There are 24 to 126 seeds per cone. The seeds are ovoid to globose, 1.8 to 2.1 centimetres (0.71 to 0.83 in) long and 1.2 to 1.5 centimetres (0.47 to 0.59 in) in diameter. The sarcotesta (seed coat) is bright red when ripe.

== Reproduction ==
Female plants usually have one cone, but a new cone may emerge on a plant that bears a cone from the previous year. Male plants reach reproductive maturity in four years, while female plants take eight years. Cones emerge in late July to early September and take about three-and-a-half months to mature. Pollen production and fertilization of the female cones occurs from mid-November to early December. It takes one to two years for seeds to mature. Pollination is mediated by a species of beetle in the Genus Pharaxonotha found in all populations of Z. stevensonii that have been studied and a species of weevil in the Genus Rhopalotria or a closely related Genus that have been found in many of the populations studied.

== Leaf development and predation ==
Plants usually add a few new leaves each year, an average of two to three, up to as many as seven. New leaves usually emerge in the first two months of the rainy season (April and May), but may also emerge in November or December. Older plants have up to 23 leaves. Greening of the new leaves begins soon after emerging, but full development of chlorophyll in the leaves can take a year. New leaves have a very high concentration of azoxyglycoside (AZG), an azoxy compound that is carcinogenic and mutagenic, and are covered by trichomes. Leaves grow rapidly at first, and the concentration of AZG and the number of trichomes falls off rapidly as the leaves grow. Leaves develop a tougher outer layer after they approach full size. The presence of AZG and tough outer layers of leaves each deter predation by insects. AZG concentration has fallen low enough after 10 days to no longer deter predation, while the outer layers of the leaves do not become tough enough to determine predation until after 100 days. The highest level of insect predation on the leaves is 20 to 30 days after emergence.Thirty percent or more of the new leaves are lost to predation by insects during the vulnerable period. Three species observed to be the primary predators on leaves. Caterpillars of the butterfly Eumaeus godartii were observed on leaves for most of the year, while the leaf beetle Aulacoscelis appendicula and a species of pleasing fungus beetle in the genus Nomotus was observed on leaves during their vulnerable period.

== Habitat ==
Z. stevensonii grows in humid tropical forest between 110 and 700 metres (360 and 2,300 ft) elevation in the area of the Panama Canal. While the species is commonly found in humid forest, it is also dry hardy. The plants are resistant to injury, and small parts of a stem removed from a plant may rejuvenate into a new plant. Z. stevensonii is adundant near the Panama Canal, in the Chagres Valley, particularly at the site of a former U.S. Army post in Chagres National Park. Plants are being illegally removed for sale, and habitat destruction is occurring in part of the species' range.

== Sources ==
- Taylor Blake, Alberto Sidney; Holzman, Gregory (2012-12-01). "A New Zamia Species from the Panama Canal Area". The Botanical Review. 78 (4): 335–344. doi:10.1007/s12229-012-9105-4. ISSN 1874-9372.
- Prado, Alberto; Sierra, Adriel; Windsor, Donald; Bede, Jacqueline C. (March 2014). "Leaf traits and herbivory levels in a tropical gymnosperm, Zamia stevensonii (Zamiaceae)". American Journal of Botany. 101 (3): 437–447. doi:10.3732/ajb.1300337. ISSN 0002-9122. PMID 24638164.
