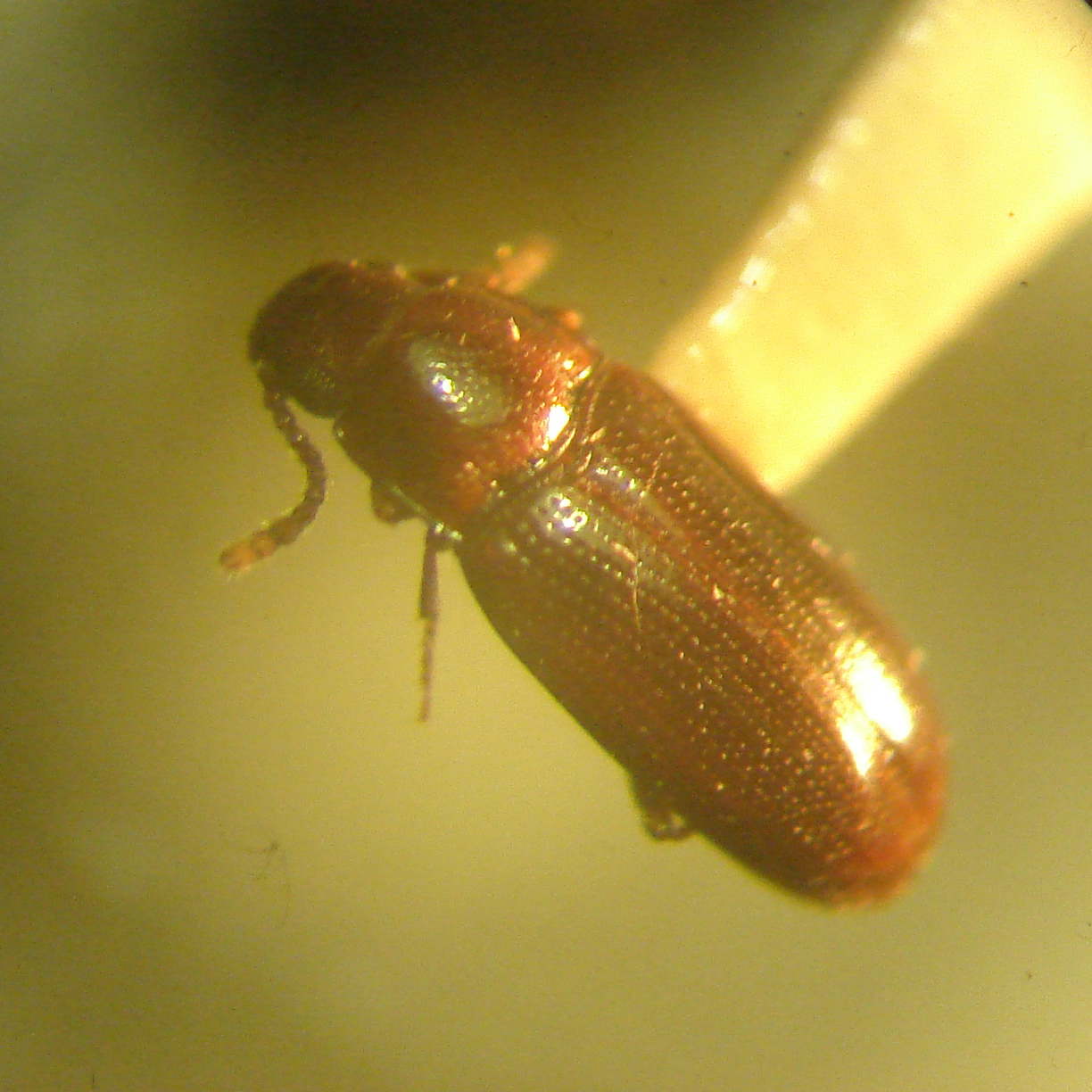

Scientific classification
- Kingdom: Animalia
- Phylum: Arthropoda
- Clade: Pancrustacea
- Class: Insecta
- Order: Coleoptera
- Suborder: Polyphaga
- Infraorder: Cucujiformia
- Family: Erotylidae
- Genus: Pharaxonotha
- Species: P. kirschii

Binomial name
- Pharaxonotha kirschii Reitter, 1875

= Pharaxonotha kirschii =

Species of beetle

Pharaxonotha kirschii is a species of pleasing fungus beetle in the family Erotylidae. It is found in Europe and Northern Asia (excluding China), Central America, and North America.

Unlike its closest relatives, which are tied to specific cycads from which they eat and which in turn get pollinated by the beetles, P.kirschii lives in litter on forest floors from Texas and Louisiana in the United States south to Panama, and has been spread elsewhere as a pest in stored foods.
