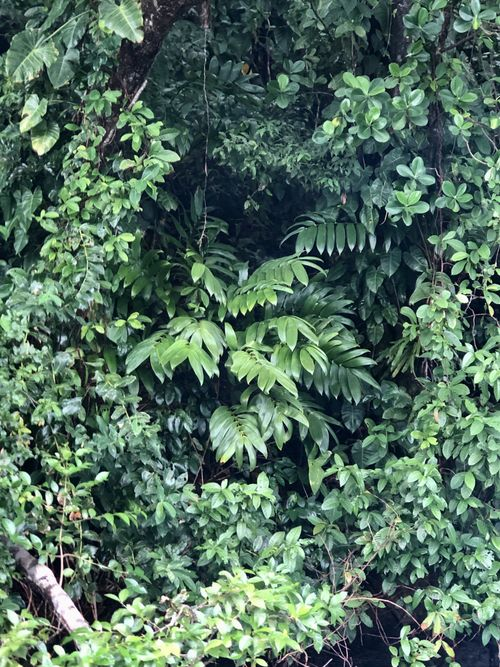

Conservation status
- Vulnerable (IUCN 3.1)

Scientific classification
- Kingdom: Plantae
- Clade: Embryophytes
- Clade: Tracheophytes
- Clade: Spermatophytes
- Clade: Gymnospermae
- Division: Cycadophyta
- Class: Cycadopsida
- Order: Cycadales
- Family: Zamiaceae
- Genus: Zamia
- Species: Z. hamannii

Binomial name
- Zamia hamannii A.S.Taylor, J.L.Haynes & Holzman

= Zamia hamannii =

Species of cycad

Zamia hamannii is a species of cycad in the family Zamiaceae. The only known population grows in a small area on an island on the northwestern Caribbean coast of Panama. Most plants of the species grow in forest, but some live on sandy beaches. It was named and described in 2008.

== Classification ==
Taylor B. et al. (2008) described Z. hamanni based on specimens from the type locality in Bocas del Toro Province, Panama. The population had previously been regarded as part of the highly variable species Z. skinneri. It remains part of the Zamia skinneri species complex. Taylor B. et al. (2012) proposed that Z. hamanni evolved from Z. skinneri or its predecessor as a result of being isolated on an island.

== Description ==
Zamia hamanni is a shrub or small tree, with a stem growing up to 2.4 metres (7 ft 10 in) tall and 7.5 to 20 centimetres (3.0 to 7.9 in) in diameter. The stem may branch at the base or the top, sometimes both. There are up to 27 leaves per crown, the average number is about 12. The leaves are 106 to 227 centimetres (42 to 89 in) long, with 5 to 10 pairs of leaflets. Leaflets are elliptic to oblong-elliptic, acuminate, plicate (pleated) between veins, and with serrated edges. Leaflets along the middle of the stem are 26 to 62 centimetres (10 to 24 in) long and 7 to 13 centimetres (2.8 to 5.1 in) wide. The leaves are rosy-brown or rosy-pink when they emerge, covered with silvery hairs. They mature to a glossy dark green.

== Reproduction ==
Like all Zamias, Z. hamanni is dioecious, with individual plants bearing either male or female stroboli or cones, but not both. Microstrobili, male cones, are 9 to 12 centimetres (3.5 to 4.7 in) long and 1.5 to 2 centimetres (0.59 to 0.79 in) wide, conical-cylindrical or elongated conical-cylindrical. The microstrobili occur singly or in groups of 2 to 6, and are yellowish to brownish-yellowish. The megastrobili, female cones, are 11 to 28 centimetres (4.3 to 11.0 in) long and 7 to 9 centimetres (2.8 to 3.5 in) wide. They are cylindrical-globose, with a single megastrobolus per plant. The megastrobili emerge covered with yellow-brown to brown hairs which mature to green or greyish-green with tan to brown hairs. Seeds are 2.4 to 2.8 centimetres (0.94 to 1.10 in) long and 1.4 to 1.8 centimetres (0.55 to 0.71 in) wide. There are up to 300 seeds in a mature cone. The sarcotesta (seed coat) is bright red on a mature seed. Strobili appear annually. Pollination occurs in September and October. While a pollination agent has not been definitely identified, beetles of the genus Pharaxonotha have been observed in male cones, and species of that genus are known pollinators of some other species of Zamia. Pollination has been observed to occur twice in a year in Z. hamanni.

== Mutualism ==
The beetle Pharaxonotha clarkorum is in an obligatory mutualistic relationship with Zamia hammanii, living and breeding in male cones and consuming pollen and cone tissues while serving as a pollinating vector by transferring pollen to female cones.

== Habitat ==
Zamia hamanni grows on soils with lots of humus in coastal lowlands or on sandy beaches subject to occasional salt-water overflow. The only known population is on an island, confined to less than 1 square kilometre (0.39 sq mi), and consists of about 1,000 plants. Most of the population grows on high humus soil on steep hillsides, sometimes overhanging the ocean. About 10% of the plants grow on beaches in small coves protected from the full force of storms, but still subject to occasional submersion in sea water. The beach plants are exposed to more sun than the others, and are generally shorter and have smaller leaves than do the plants away from the beaches. Very few seedlings were seen on the beaches. As of 2024, the habitat is relatively unthreatened, but development of resorts on the island in the future would pose a threat.

== Sources ==
- Taylor B., Alberto S.; Haynes, Jody L.; Holzman, Greg (2008). "Taxonomical, nomenclatural and biogeographical revelations in the Zamie skinneri complex of Central America (Cycadales; Zamiaceae)" (PDF). Botanical Journal of the Linnean Society. 158 (3): 399–429. doi:10.1111/j.1095-8339.2008.00886.x.
- Taylor B., Alberto S.; Haynes, Jody L.; Stevenson, Dennis W.; Holzman, Gregory; Mendieta, Jorge (2012). "Biogeographic Insights in Central American Cycad Biology" (PDF). In Stevens, Lawrence (ed.). Global Advances in Biogeography. Rejika, Croatia: InTechOpen. pp. 73–98. ISBN 978-953-51-0454-4.
