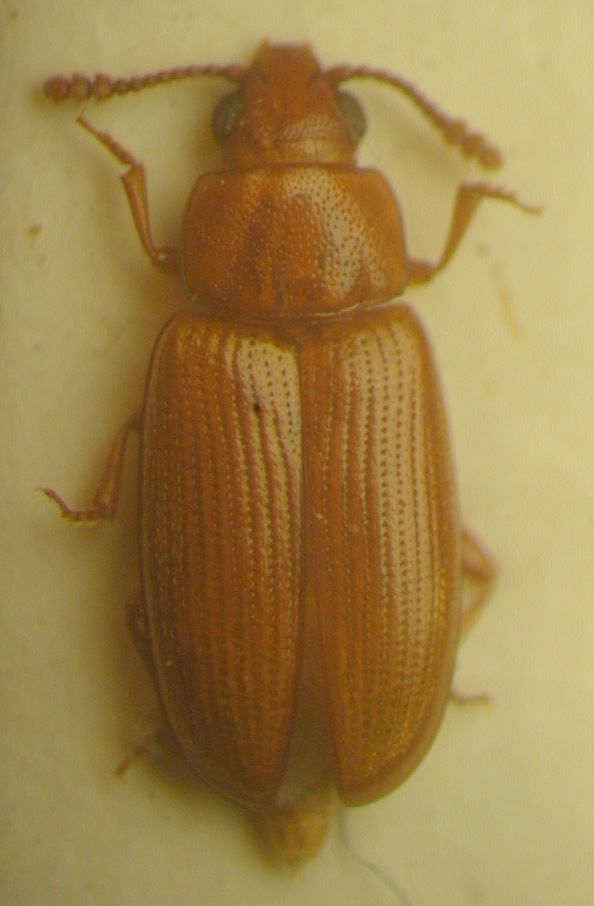

Scientific classification
- Kingdom: Animalia
- Phylum: Arthropoda
- Clade: Pancrustacea
- Class: Insecta
- Order: Coleoptera
- Suborder: Polyphaga
- Infraorder: Cucujiformia
- Family: Erotylidae
- Genus: Pharaxonotha
- Species: P. floridana

Binomial name
- Pharaxonotha floridana (Casey, 1890)

Synonyms
- Pharaxonotha zamiae Blake, 1928; Planismus floridanus Casey, 1890

= Pharaxonotha floridana =

Species of beetle

Pharaxonotha floridana is a species of pleasing fungus beetle in the family Erotylidae. It has been reported only from Florida.

This beetle critically depends on the coontie cycad (Zamia integrifolia) to survive; while it eats some of the cycad's pollen, it also pollinates the cycad. Even though the relationship is not a symbiosis in the strict sense (because the beetles slightly damage the cycads) and not a two-way obligatory mutualism either (because Z.integrifolia also employs the belid weevil Rhopalotria slossoni as pollinator), the survival of P.floridana and Z.integrifolia is still closely connected.
