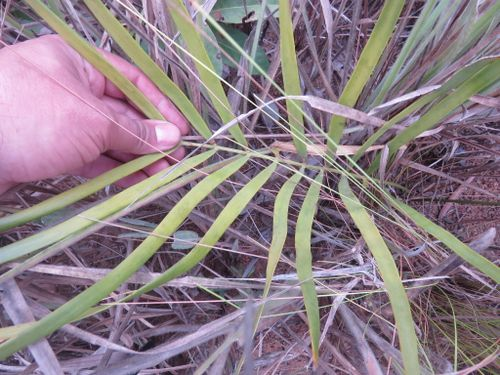

Conservation status
- Least Concern (IUCN 3.1)

Scientific classification
- Kingdom: Plantae
- Clade: Tracheophytes
- Clade: Gymnospermae
- Division: Cycadophyta
- Class: Cycadopsida
- Order: Cycadales
- Family: Zamiaceae
- Genus: Zamia
- Species: Z. boliviana

Binomial name
- Zamia boliviana (Brongn.) A.DC.

Synonyms
- Ceratozamia boliviana Brongn.

= Zamia boliviana =

Species of cycad

Zamia boliviana is a species of plant in the family Zamiaceae. It is endemic to Bolivia and Mato Grosso, Brazil.

== Description ==
Zamia boliviana has an in-ground cylindrical stem. There are one to three compound-leaves on a crown standing 0.8 metres (2 ft 7 in) tall. The leaves are up to 119 centimetres (47 in) long. The petiole (stalk) is smooth, with no prickles. There are 16 to 40 leaflets on a leaf which are 19 to 29 centimetres (7.5 to 11.4 in) long and 1.1 to 2.0 centimetres (0.43 to 0.79 in) wide, linear-lanceolate in shape, tapering to a point, and with a smooth edge along most of the leaflet and a few teeth toward the tip.

Like all Zamias, Zamia brasiliensis is dioecious, with each plant being either male or female. There are up to five male strobili (cones) on the crown of a male plant. The male cones are cylindrical, on short peduncles (stalks), and covered in yellow-cream hairs. There is only one female strobilus (cone) on the crown of a female plant, which is cream-tan with green undertones or cream-yellow to tan. Seeds are 11.1 to 15.3 millimetres (0.44 to 0.60 in) by 7.2 to 10.2 millimetres (0.28 to 0.40 in) wide.

Both male and female cones emerge during the dry season, June through October. Male cones live about 60 days, while female cones last about 330 days, releasing their seeds in April through August. Female plants do not produce seeds every year. Over a three-year period at one study site, only 71% of the female plants reproduced, and none did so twice.

== Mutualism ==
The beetle Pharaxonotha cerradensis is in an obligatory mutualistic relationship with Zamia boliviana, living and breeding in male cones and consuming pollen and cone tissues while serving as a pollinating vector by transferring pollen to female cones.

== Habitat and range ==
Zamia boliviana is found between 130 and 450 metres (430 and 1,480 ft) of altitude in the Cerrado ecoregion in Beni, Cochabamba, La Paz, and Santa Cruz departments in Bolivia and Mato Grosso state in Brazil.

Zamia boliviana is likely closely related to Z. brasiliensis, sharing many characteristics. They both lack prickles on their pedicles, a rare trait in mainland Zamia (i.e., aside from the Florida/Caribbean clade), and have broadly similar strobili (reproductive cones). However, leaflets on Z. brasiliensis are much wider than on Z. boliviana, and there are consistent diagnostic distinctions in the cones. Z. brasiliensis is found east of Z. boliviana in Brazil, with no overlap in range between the two.

== Sources ==
- de Candolle, Alphonse (1864). Prodromus systematis naturalis regni vegetabilis, sive, Enumeratio contracta ordinum generum specierumque plantarum huc usque cognitarium, juxta methodi naturalis, normas digesta (in Latin). Vol. v.16:pt.2 (1864-1868). Paris: Victoris Masson et Filii.
- Segalla, Rosane; Calonje, Michael (2019-05-16). "Zamia brasiliensis, a new species of Zamia (Zamiaceae, Cycadales) from Mato Grosso and Rondônia, Brazil". Phytotaxa. 404 (1): 1–11. Bibcode:2019Phytx.404....1S. doi:10.11646/phytotaxa.404.1.1. ISSN 1179-3163.
- Segalla, Rosane; Pinheiro, Fábio; Baronio, Gudryan J.; Morellato, Leonor Patrícia Cerdeira (January 2022). "Phenology of Zamia boliviana (Zamiaceae), a threatened species from a seasonally dry biodiversity hotspot in South America". Plant Species Biology. 37 (1): 118–131. Bibcode:2022PSBio..37..118S. doi:10.1111/1442-1984.12360. hdl:11449/233893.
