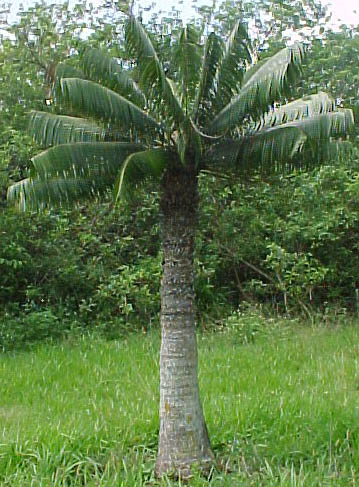

Conservation status
- Critically Endangered (IUCN 3.1)
- CITES Appendix I

Scientific classification
- Kingdom: Plantae
- Clade: Embryophytes
- Clade: Tracheophytes
- Clade: Gymnosperms
- Division: Cycadophyta
- Class: Cycadopsida
- Order: Cycadales
- Family: Zamiaceae
- Tribe: Zamieae
- Subtribe: Microcycadinae; D.W.Stev.
- Genus: Microcycas; A.DC.
- Species: M. calocoma

Binomial name
- Microcycas calocoma (Miq.) A.DC., 1868

Synonyms
- Zamia calocoma Miq.

= Microcycas =

Genus of cycads

Microcycas is a genus of cycads in the family Zamiaceae containing only one species, Microcycas calocoma, endemic to a small area in western Cuba in Pinar del Río Province. It is estimated that there are 50-249 mature individuals left in the wild.

== Description ==
The plant grows up to 10 m (33 ft) tall with an upright, sometimes branching trunk that grows to 30–60 cm (12–24 in) in diameter. The leaves are dark green and 0.6–1.2 m (2 ft 0 in – 3 ft 11 in) long. One unique character is that the leaves appear to be truncated near the apex because the middle and distal leaflets have similar lengths. The petioles are 8–10 cm (3.1–3.9 in) long and lack spines; the rachises also lack spines. leaflets are light to dark green, lanceolate, articulate at the base, and leathery with an entire margin. Middle leaflets are 15–25 cm (5.9–9.8 in) long by 0.8–1 cm wide. Male cones are cylindrical, 25–30 cm (9.8–11.8 in) long and 5–8 cm (2.0–3.1 in) in diameter, yellow-brown, and hairy. Seed cones are broadly cylindrical, 50–90 cm (20–35 in) long and 13–16 cm (5.1–6.3 in) in diameter, yellow-brown, and hairy. The sporophylls have two round apical projections. The elliptical seeds are pink or red in color, 3.5–4 cm (1.4–1.6 in) long and 2–2.5 cm (0.8–1.0 in) in diameter.

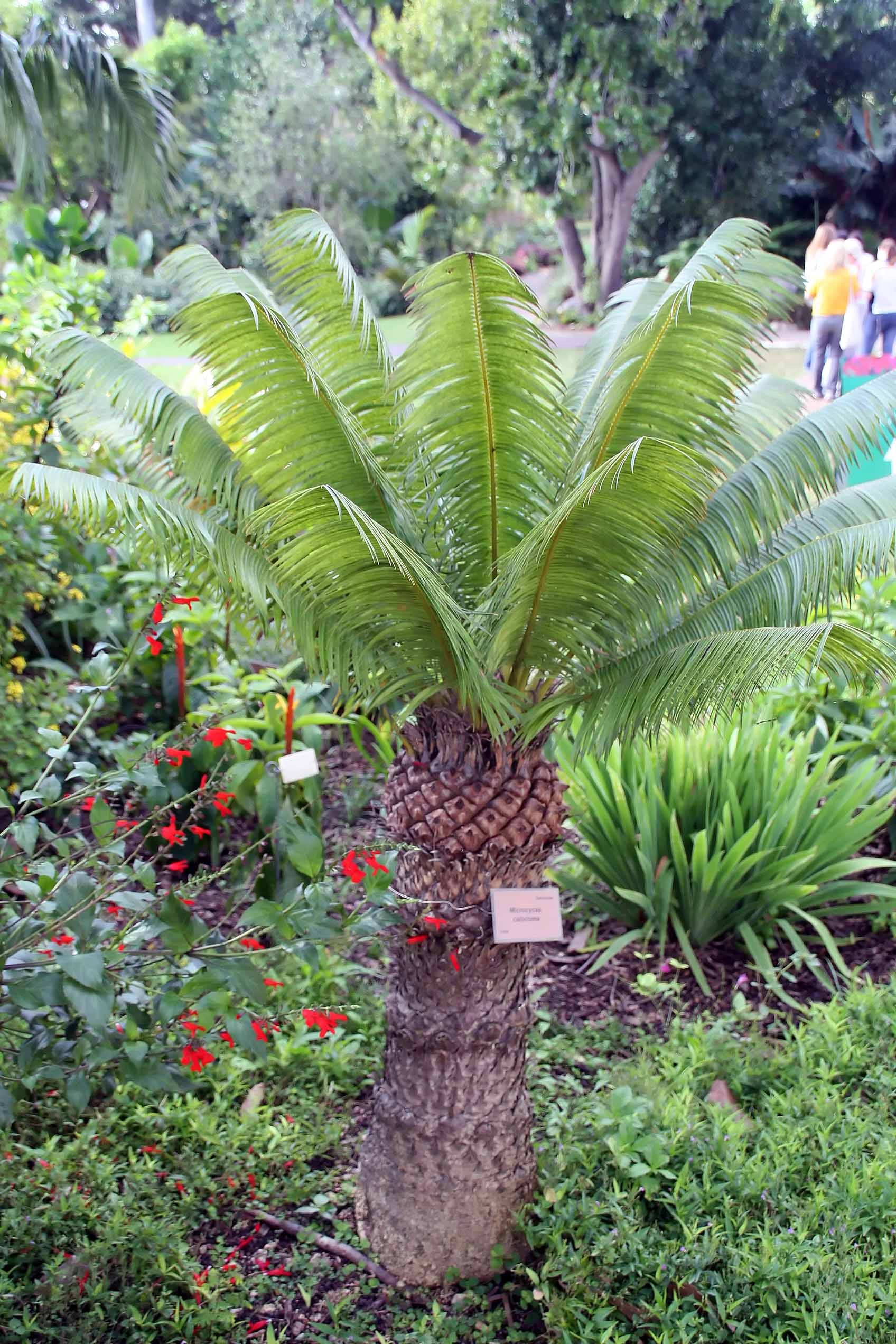
Plant

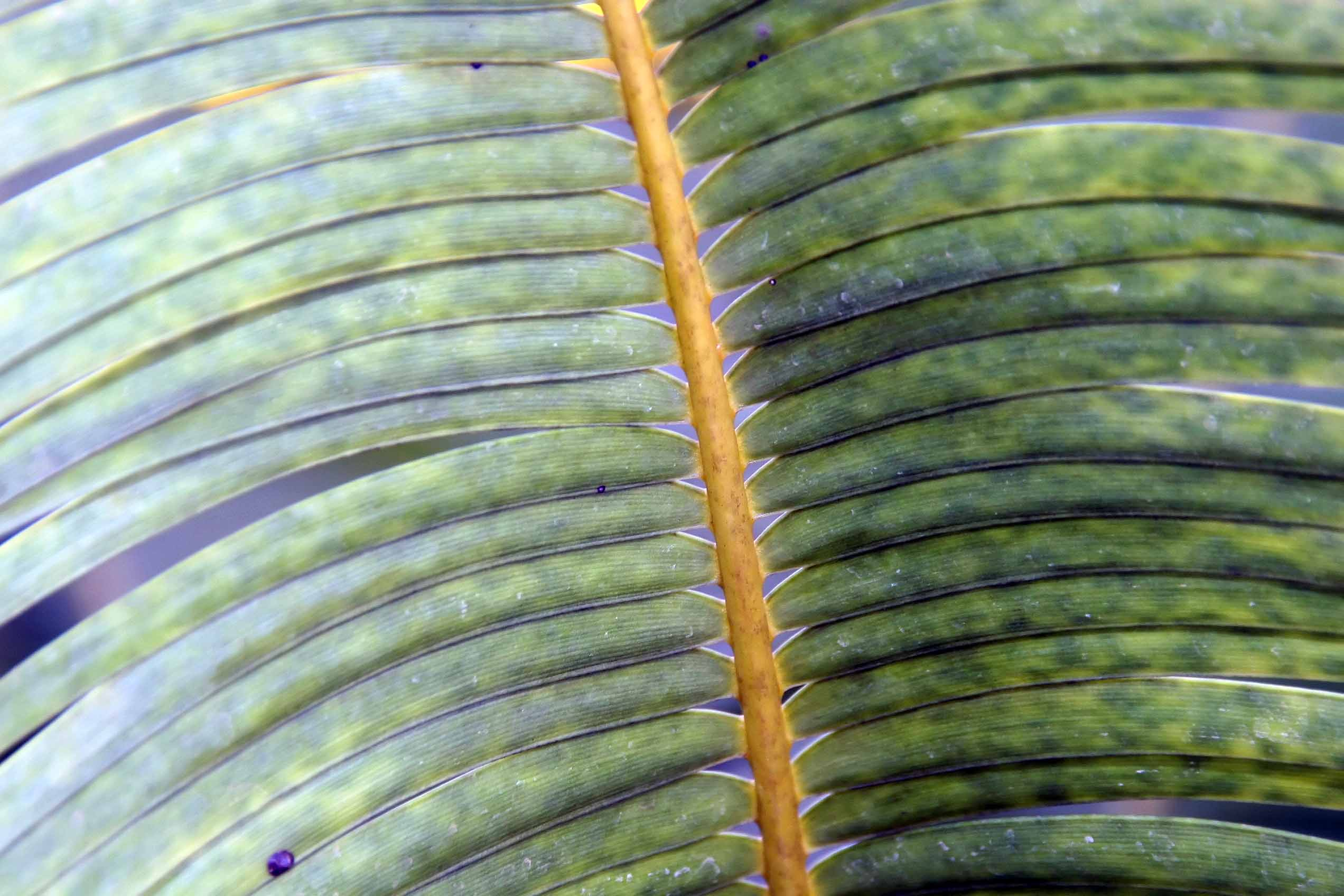
Leaves

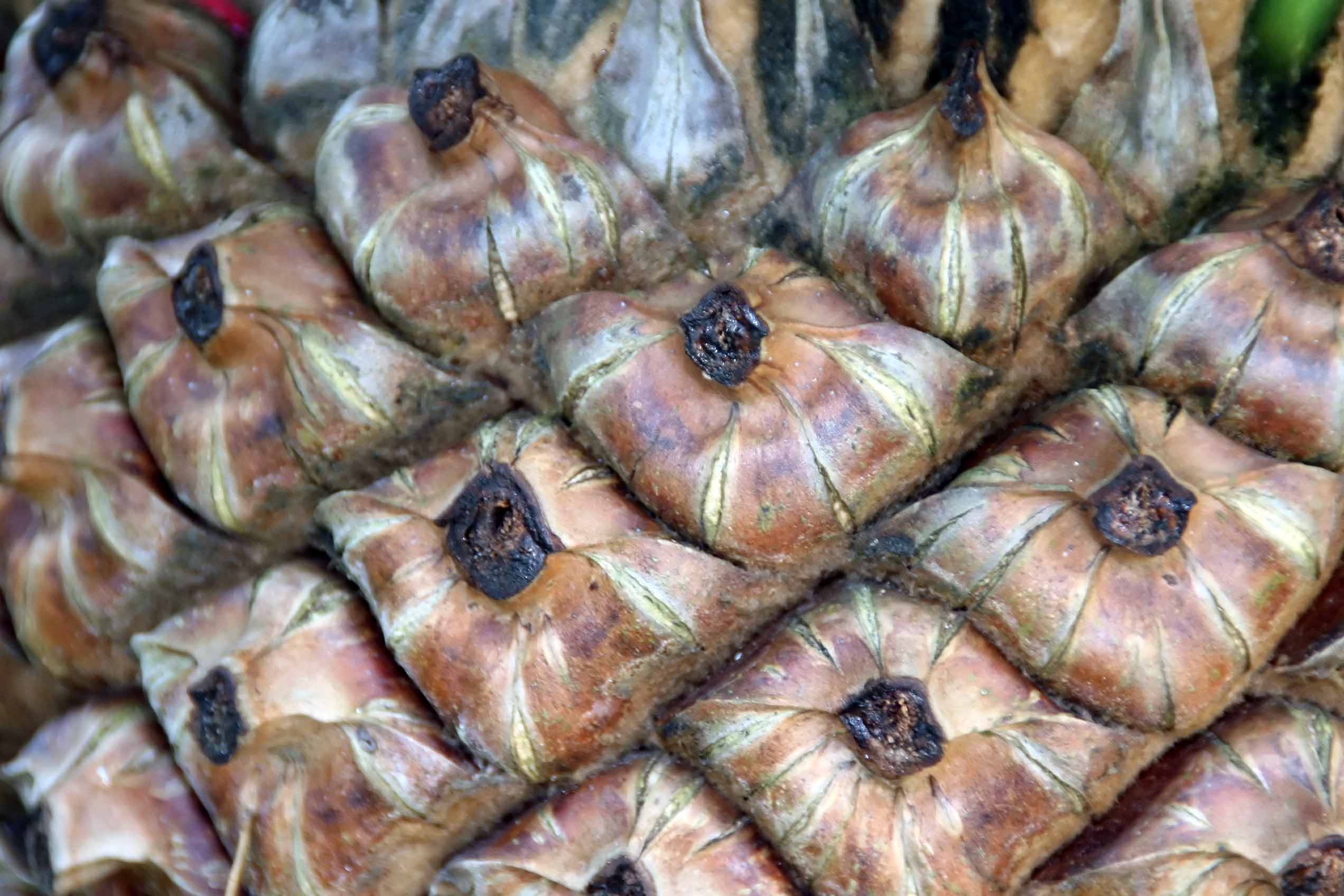
Trunk

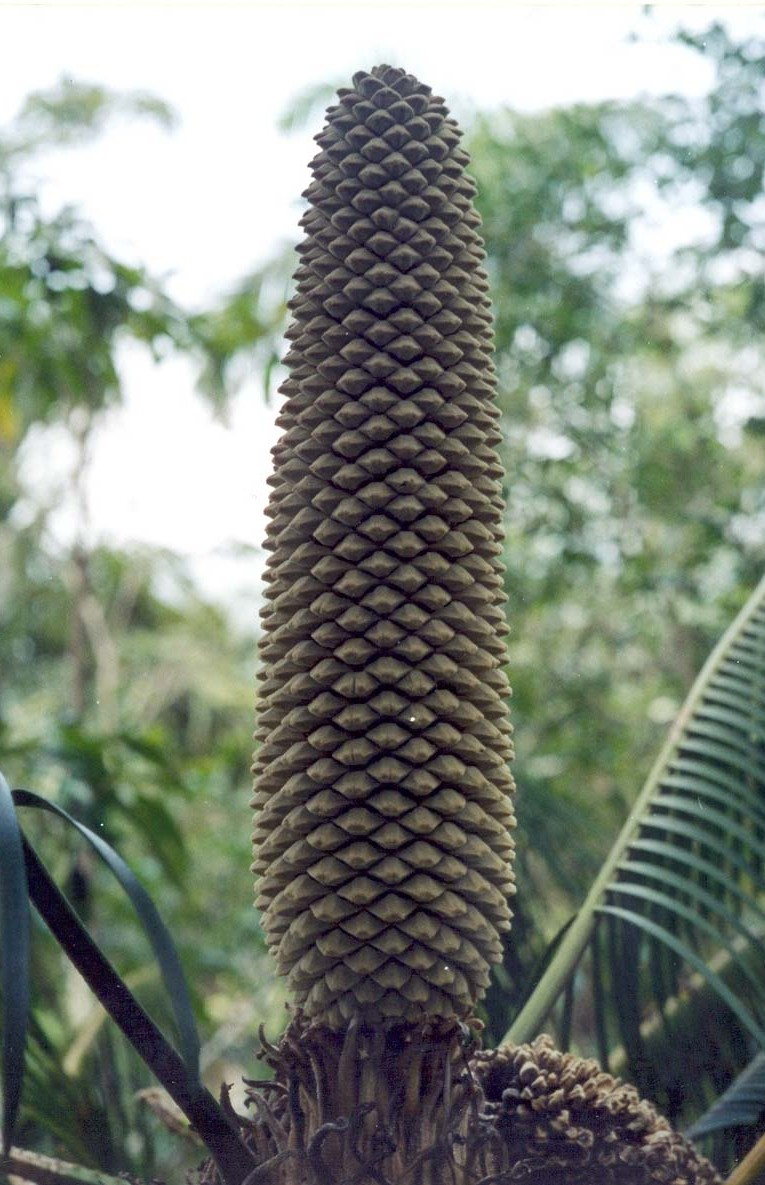
Cone

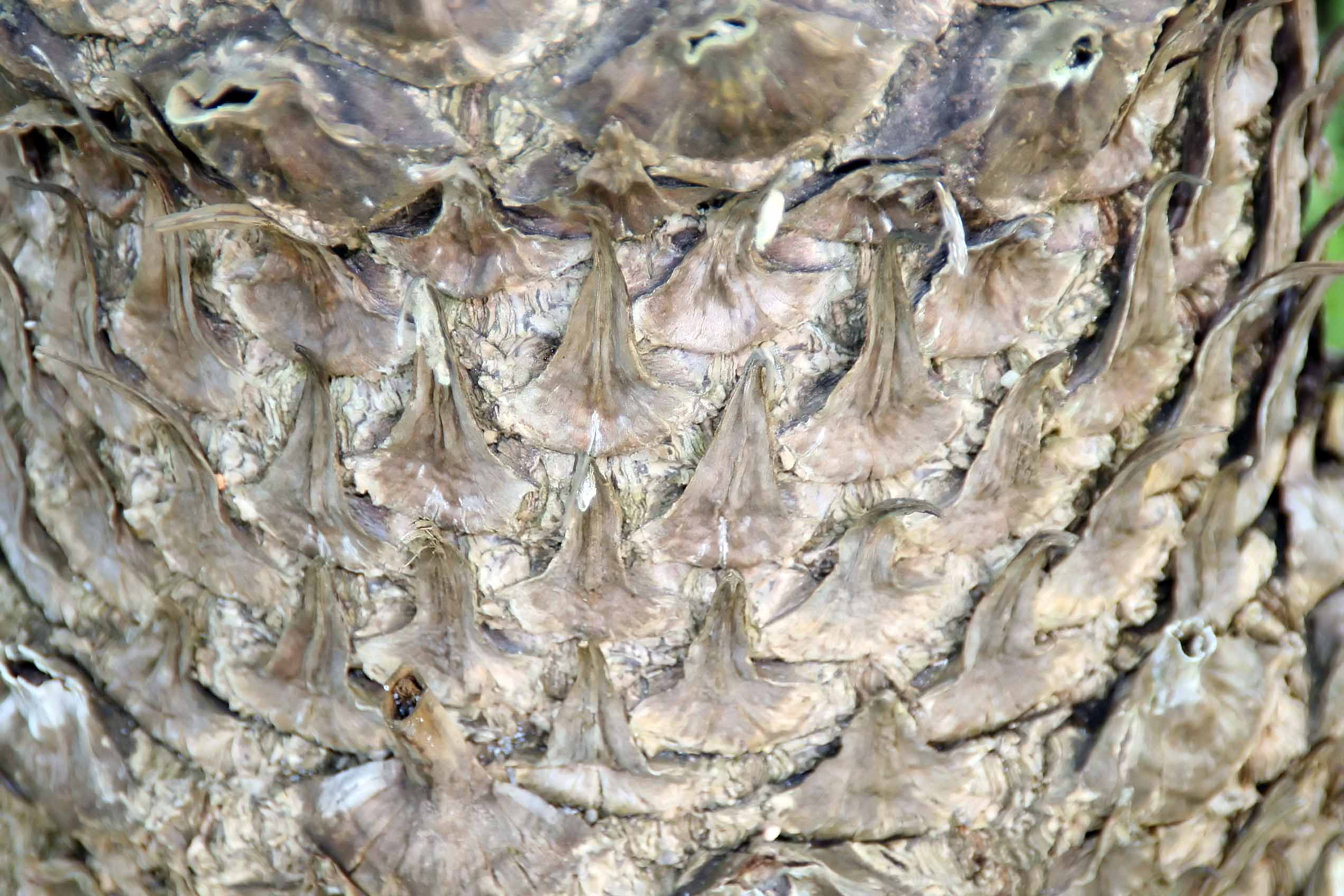
Trunk

== Distribution ==
In its native range, Microcycas calocoma grows in small groups of 10–50 plants in montane forests at 85–250 m (280–820 ft) elevation. It also grows on the slopes of gullies and in open grassland and scrub at 50 m (160 ft) altitude. Soil types range from alkaline loam developed on limestone to acidic clays containing silica. In many of these groups of plants, however, the sex ratio is very unbalanced, resulting in a low output of seedlings. Humans have negatively impacted the species through forestry operations, clearing of land, and pesticide use. Because of the plant's graceful and ornamental appearance, harvesting of plants and seeds by growers has also seriously affected M. calocoma. Many populations are now protected in reserves.

== Mutualism ==
The beetles Pharaxonotha esperanzae is in an obligatory mutualistic relationship with Microcycas calocoma, living and breeding in male cones and consuming pollen and cone tissues while serving as pollinating vectors by transferring pollen to female cones.

== Conservation ==
The species is critically endangered, with a world population of only about 600 plants. It is listed under CITES Appendix I which prohibits international trade in specimens of this species except when the purpose of the import is not commercial, for instance for scientific research.

Although Microcycas calocoma's round crown and shiny drooping leaves make it a very ornamental plant, cultivation is limited due to the lack of growing material. Locals have used the plant's toxic roots as a rat poison.

== Threats ==
Habitat destruction and fragmentation have a moderate impact on the plants, along with the issue of over-collecting them from their natural environment. There is also a potential concern about reproductive failure due to the extinction of pollinators, although further verification is required to confirm this.
