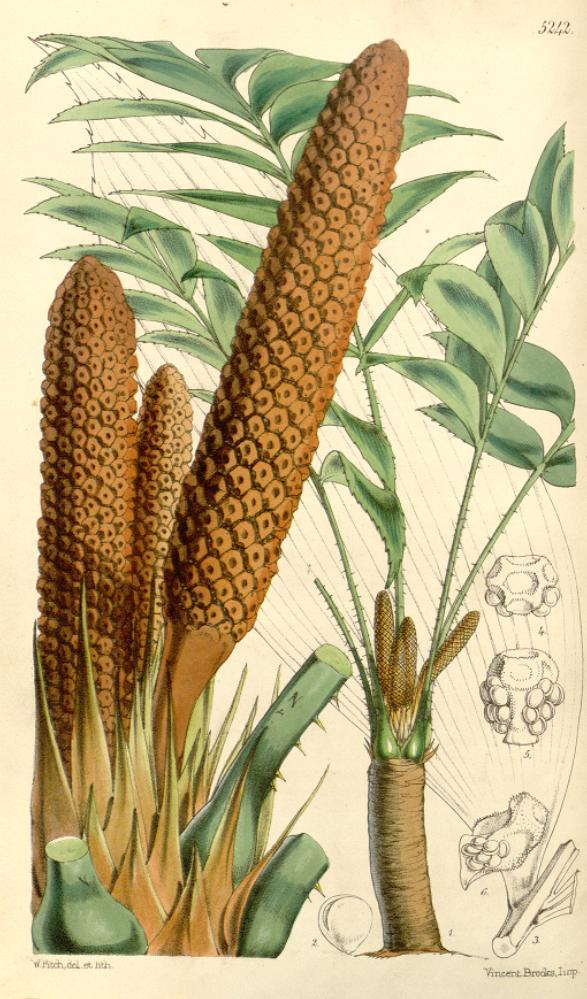
- Zamia skinneri, Illustration.

Conservation status
- Endangered (IUCN 3.1)

Scientific classification
- Kingdom: Plantae
- Clade: Tracheophytes
- Clade: Gymnospermae
- Division: Cycadophyta
- Class: Cycadopsida
- Order: Cycadales
- Family: Zamiaceae
- Genus: Zamia
- Species: Z. skinneri

Binomial name
- Zamia skinneri Warsz. ex A.Dietr.

Synonyms
- Aulacophyllum skinneri (Warsz. ex A.Dietr.) Regel; Palmifolium skinneri (Warsz. ex A.Dietr.) Kuntze; Zamia forgetiana J.Schust.; Zamia skinneri var. latifolia J.Verschaff.

= Zamia skinneri =

Species of cycad

Z. skinneri species complex based on transcriptomes

- Zamia
  - - - - - Zamia skinneri
          - Zamia nesophila
      - - Zamia hamannii
    - - Zamia imperialis
  - Zamis neurophyllidia

Zamia skinneri is a species of plant in the family Zamiaceae. It is endemic to the coastal area of mainland Bocas del Toro Province, Panama. Its common name is cebolla roja.

This has long been considered to be a variable plant that was likely a species complex, with individuals actually belonging to several undescribed species. In 2008 some populations were studied, characterized as new species, and renamed Zamia hamannii, Zamia imperialis, and Zamia nesophila. This recategorization reduced the size of the population of actual Z. skinneri to fewer than 500.

== Classification history ==
Considerable confusion has surrounded the formal description of Z. skinneri. It was first described in 1851 by Albert Gottfried Dietrich from a specimen collected by Józef Warszewicz in the mountains of Veraguas in Panama in 1850. In the following years, populations of Z. skinneri were reported from several provinces in Panama, and various locations in Colombia, Costa Rica, Guatemala, and Nicaragua. In 1980, K. J. Norstog reported that Z. skinneri plants from central Atlantic Costa Rica, called "green-emergent Z. skinneri" (new leaves emerge green in color and mature to a bright green), had a chromosome count of 2n=18, while those from central Atlantic Panama, "red-emergent Z. skinneri" (new leaves emerge red in color and mature to a dark green), had a count of 2n=22.

In 1993, D. W. Stevenson described Z. neurophyllidia as a smaller version of Z. skinneri, with a chromosome count of 2n=18. He stated that Z. neurophyllidia was endemic to Panama, while Z. skinneri occurred from southern Nicaragua to northern Panama. In the 1990s, the World List of Cycads reported Z. skinneri to have a range including Costa Rica, Nicaragua and northern Panama, with Z. neurophyllidia occurring only in Panama. After 2000 the World List of Cycads swapped the ranges of those species, reporting Z. skinneri to be found only in central Panama, and Z. neurophyllidia having a range that included northern Panama, Costa Rice, and southern Nicaragua.

== Species complex ==
A study published in 2004 proposed that Z. neurophyllidia and Z. skinneri were a "hybrid species complex", and that Z. skinneri included several morphologically distinct populations. In 2008 Taylor B. et al. re-characteized Z. skinneri and Z. neurophyllidia, both with a type locality of Boca del Toros Province. Both species are green emergent, but adult Z. neurophyllidia plants are consistently smaller than adult Z. skinneri. They also described three new species from populations previously ascribed to Z. skinneri, Z. hamannii, Z. nesophila, and Z. imperialis. Z. hamannii and Z. nesophila have type localities of Boca del Toros Province, while the type locality for Z. imperialis is Coclé Province, Panama. Z. nesophila has green-emergent leaves, while the other two species have red-emergent leaves.

== Mutualism ==
The beetle Pharaxonotha clarkorum is in an obligatory mutualistic relationship with Zamia skinneri, living and breeding in male cones and consuming pollen and cone tissues while serving as a pollinating vector by transferring pollen to female cones.

== Sources ==
- Taylor B., Alberto S.; Haynes, Jody L.; Holzman, Greg (2008). "Taxonomical, nomenclatural and biogeographical revelations in the Zamie skinneri complex of Central America (Cycadales; Zamiaceae)" (PDF). Botanical Journal of the Linnean Society. 158: 399–429.
