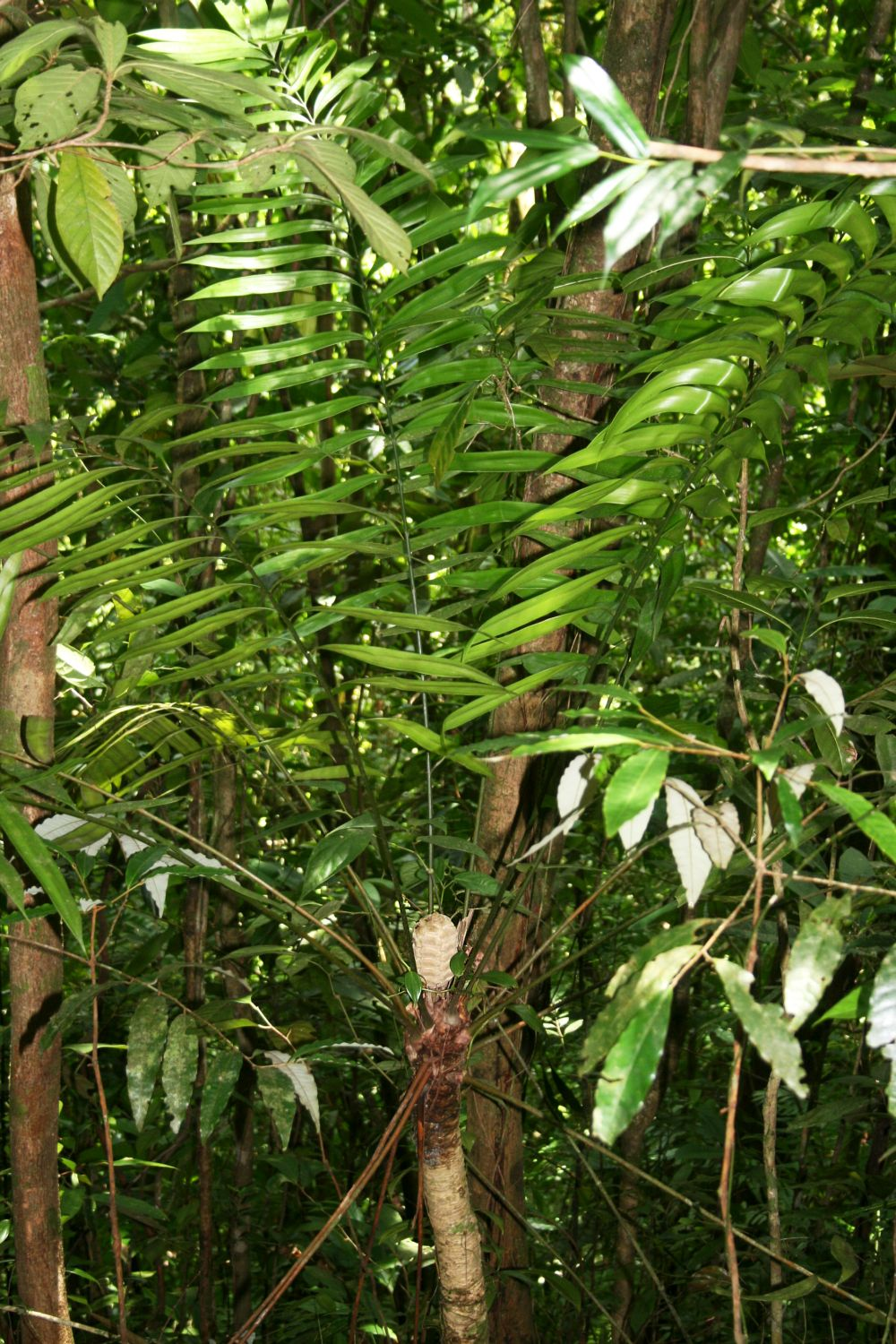

Conservation status
- Near Threatened (IUCN 3.1)

Scientific classification
- Kingdom: Plantae
- Clade: Embryophytes
- Clade: Tracheophytes
- Clade: Spermatophytes
- Clade: Gymnospermae
- Division: Cycadophyta
- Class: Cycadopsida
- Order: Cycadales
- Family: Zamiaceae
- Genus: Zamia
- Species: Z. fairchildiana

Binomial name
- Zamia fairchildiana L.D.Gómez

= Zamia fairchildiana =

Species of cycad

Zamia fairchildiana is a species of plant in the family Zamiaceae. It is found in southeastern Costa Rica and western Panama. It is threatened by habitat loss.

== Etymology ==
The epithet fairchildiana, refers to either the botanist David Fairchild, or his son, the entomologist A. G. B. "Sandy" Fairchild.

== Phylogenetic history ==
Zamia fairchildiana was originally defined to include scattered populations from southeastern Costa Rica to the Guna Yala indigenous region in eastern Panama. It was soon recognized that the population in central and eastern Panama was not the species Z. fairchildiana, and there were no known populations of either species between Costa Rica and Colon. The new species in Panama was described and named Z. elegantissima in 1998. In 2004, two populations in San_José_Province, Costa Rica, that had been included in Z. fairchildiana were recognized as belonging to Z. acuminata. A molecular phylogenetics study in 2019 using DNA and one in 2024 using transcriptomes found Z. fairchildiana to be sister to Z. pseudomonticola and in a clade with Z. acuminata and Z. nana.

== Description ==
The stem of Zamia fairchildiana is erect (tree-like), 0.5 to 1 metre (1 ft 8 in to 3 ft 3 in) tall, and 6 to 15 centimetres (2.4 to 5.9 in) in diameter. It has three to ten compound-leaves on the apex of the stem. Leaves are 0.7 to 2 metres (2 ft 4 in to 6 ft 7 in) (exceptionally 2.5 metres (8 ft 2 in)) long. Petioles (leaf stalks) are 0.3 to 0.5 metres (1 ft 0 in to 1 ft 8 in) (exceptionally 0.8 metres (2 ft 7 in)) long and densely covered with prickles. The lower third of the rachis (leaf mid-rib) also has prickles. There are 10 to 30 pairs of leaflets on a leaf. The leaflets are oblong, somewhat sickle shaped, with acute points, and have a few fine teeth near the tip of the leaflet.

Like all cycads, Zamia fairchildiana is dioecious, with individual plants being either male or female. Male strobili (cones) are cylindrical, 10 to 40 centimetres (3.9 to 15.7 in) long and 2 to 5 centimetres (0.79 to 1.97 in) in diameter, and cream to yellow in color. Female strobili are cylindrical, 20 to 30 centimetres (7.9 to 11.8 in) long and 6 to 10 centimetres (2.4 to 3.9 in) in diameter, and yellow-green to light brown in color. Seeds are ovoid, 1 to 1.5 centimetres (0.39 to 0.59 in) long, and red in color.

== Reproduction ==
Unlike some species of Zamia, most Zamia fairchildiana plants produce reproductive cones even when growing in shade. Ripe seeds are visible in Z. fairchildiana female cones before the cones start breaking down, in contrast to seeds of Z. elegantissima, which are not visible until cones do break down.

== Mutualism ==
The beetle Pharaxonotha confusa is in an obligatory mutualistic relationship with Zamia fairchildiana, living and breeding in male cones and consuming pollen and cone tissues while serving as a pollinating vector by transferring pollen to female cones.

== Distribution and habitat ==
The type site for Zamia fairchildiana is in Costa Rica, It is reported to be abundant around the Golfo Duce in Puntarenas Province on the southern Pacific coast of Costa Rica. A small population of Zamia fairchildiana is in Chiriquí Province in Panama. It is found in rainforests with about 5,000 millimetres (200 in) of average annual rainfall.

== Sources ==
- Calonje, Michael; Meerow, Alan W.; Griffith, M. Patrick; Salas-Leiva, Dayana; Vovides, Andrew P.; Coiro, Mario; Francisco-Ortega, Javier (May 2019). "A Time-Calibrated Species Tree Phylogeny of the New World Cycad Genus Zamia L. (Zamiaceae, Cycadales)". International Journal of Plant Sciences. 180 (4): 286–314. doi:10.1086/702642. ISSN 1058-5893.
- Lindström, Anders J.; Calonje, Michael; Stevenson, Dennis; Husby, Chad; Taylor, Alberto (2013). "Clarification of Zamia Acuminata and a new Zamia species from Coclé Province, Panama". Phytotaxa. 98 (2): 27–42. doi:10.11646/phytotaxa.98.2.1 – via ResearchGate.
- Lindström, Anders; Habib, Sadaf; Dong, Shanshan; Gong, Yiqing; Liu, Jian; Calonje, Michael; Stevenson, Dennis; Zhang, Shouzhou (November 2024). "Transcriptome sequencing data provide a solid base to understand the phylogenetic relationships, biogeography and reticulated evolution of the genus Zamia L. (Cycadales: Zamiaceae)". Annals of Botany. 134 (5): 747–768. doi:10.1093/aob/mcae065. ISSN 0305-7364. PMC 11560380. PMID 38900840.
- Lopez-Gallego, Cristina (2018). "Understanding Life History of Zamia Species Using Data from Field Studies and Botanical Collections". In Li, Nan; Stevenson, Dennis Wm.; Griffith, M. Patrick (eds.). Cycad Biology and Conservation: The 9th International Conference on Cycad Biology. Bronx, New York: New York Botanical Garden. pp. 156–178. doi:10.21135/893275389.013. ISBN 978-0-89327-538-9 – via ResearchGate.
- Schutzman, Bart; Vovides, Andrew P.; Adams, Russell S. (1998). "A New Zamia (Zamiacea, Cycalades) from Central Panama". Phytologia. 85 (3): 137–145. doi:10.5962/bhl.part.7783 – via Biodiversity Heritage Library.
- Stevenson, Dennis Wm. (1993). "The Zamiaceae in Panama with Comments on Phytogeography and Species Relationships". Brittonia. 45 (1): 1–16. doi:10.2307/2806850. ISSN 0007-196X. JSTOR 2806850.
- Taylor Blake, Alberto Sidney; Holzman, Gregory (10 October 2012). "A New Zamia Species from the Panama Canal Area". The Botanical Review. 78 (4): 335–344. doi:10.1007/s12229-012-9105-4. ISSN 0006-8101.
