= Zamia elegantissima =

Conservation status
- Endangered (IUCN 3.1)

Scientific classification
- Kingdom: Plantae
- Clade: Embryophytes
- Clade: Tracheophytes
- Clade: Gymnosperms
- Division: Cycadophyta
- Class: Cycadopsida
- Order: Cycadales
- Family: Zamiaceae
- Genus: Zamia
- Species: Z. elegantissima

Binomial name
- Zamia elegantissima Schutzman, Vovides & R.S.Adams

Species of cycad

Zamia elegantissima is a species of cycad in the family Zamiaceae. It is found on the Atlantic Coast of Colón Province, Panama.

== Etymology ==
The species epithet refers to the "extremely elegant" appearance of the plant.

== Phylogenetic history ==
Robert Louis Dressler referred in the late 1970s to the species now named Zamia elegantissima by the informal term Zamia pseudo-pseudoparasitica, but expressed an intention to name it after the botanist A. G. B. Fairchild when he had formally described the species. In 1982, another botanist named a species found in Costa Rica Z. fairchildiana, honoring David Fairchild, A. G. B.'s father. In 1993, the range of Z. fairchildiana was given as from southeastern Costa Rica to Guna Yala in eastern Panama. It was soon recognized that the population in Panama was not the species Z. fairchildiana, and there were no known populations of either species between Costa Rica and Colon. The new species in Panama was described and named Z. elegantissima in 1998 by Schutzman, Vovides, and Adams. The initial description was deemed invalid because the authors had not identified the holotype and isotype of the species. The authors corrected the defect later that year.

Schutzman, Vovides, and Adams associated Zamia elegantissima with a Z. fairchildiana species group, which included several other species. In 2012, Taylor Blake and Holzman described a new species found in the area around the Panama Canal, Z. stevensonii, based on plants that had previously been confused with Z. elegantissima. A 2019 molecular genetics study using DNA and a 2024 study using transcriptomes both placed Z. elegantissima in a clade with Z.obliqua and Z. stevensonii within the Isthmus clade.

== Description ==
Zamia elegantissima plants are tree-like, with the trunk standing upright, and are up to 3 metres (9.8 ft) tall. There are many upright compound leaves, up to 30 on cultivated plants. The leaves are up to 170 centimetres (67 in) long. leaflets are lanceolate, 20 to 22 centimetres (7.9 to 8.7 in) long and 2.5 to 4 centimetres (0.98 to 1.57 in) wide. The outer half of leaflets are toothed, the teeth being 0.5 to 1.5 millimetres (0.020 to 0.059 in) long. Leaves are apple-green when growing, bright green and shiny when mature. petioles (leaf stalks) are 43 to 44 centimetres (17 to 17 in) long, and may have some small prickles. Emergent leaves of Z. elegantissima are bright yellow.

Like all cycads, Zamia elegantissima is dioecious, with plants being either male or female. Male strobili (cones) are cylindrical and beige-yelloe to light brown in color, with green undertones. They stand upright on peduncles (stalks) that are covered with hairs. Female strobili are cylindrical with a large pointed or rounded top, and are tan to light brown with green undertones. Strobili and peduncles are covered with hairs. Seeds are 2.8 to 3 centimetres (1.1 to 1.2 in) long, 1.6 to 1.8 centimetres (0.63 to 0.71 in) wide, and bright red.

== Distribution and habitat ==
Zamia elegantissima is found north of the Panama Canal in Colón Province and in the indigenous region of Guna Yala, in Panama. It is found in lowland rainforest and disturbed areas. Plants in areas with direct exposure to sunlight, along streams and in treefall gaps are more likely to have strobili (cones).

== Sources ==
- Calonje, Claudia; Knowles, Lindy; Calonje, Michael; Husby, Chad (2014). "Variability of Vegetative Flush Colors in Zamia (cycadales)". Journal of the Botanical Research Institute of Texas. 8 (2): 531–540. ISSN 1934-5259. JSTOR 26549403.
- Calonje, Michael; Meerow, Alan W.; Griffith, M. Patrick; Salas-Leiva, Dayana; Vovides, Andrew P.; Coiro, Mario; Francisco-Ortega, Javier (May 2019). "A Time-Calibrated Species Tree Phylogeny of the New World Cycad Genus Zamia L. (Zamiaceae, Cycadales)". International Journal of Plant Sciences. 180 (4): 286–314. doi:10.1086/702642. ISSN 1058-5893.
- Lindstrom, Anders; Habib, Sadaf; Dong, Shanshan; Gong, Yiqing; Liu, Jian; Calonje, Michael; Stevenson, Dennis; Zhang, Shouzhou (November 2024). "Transcriptome sequencing data provide a solid base to understand the phylogenetic relationships, biogeography and reticulated evolution of the genus Zamia L. (Cycadales: Zamiaceae)". Annals of Botany. 134 (5): 747–768. doi:10.1093/aob/mcae065. ISSN 0305-7364. PMC 11560380. PMID 38900840.
- Schutzman, B.; Vovides, A. P.; Adams, R. S. (September 1998a). "A new Zamia (Zamiaceae, Cycadales) from central Panama" (PDF). Phytologia. 85 (3): 137–145 – via The Cycad Society.
- Schutzman, B.; Vovides, A. P.; Adams, R. S. (December 1998b). "Validation of the name Zamia elegantissima Schutzman, Vovides, & Adams". Phytologia. 85 (6): 389 – via Biodiversity Heritage Library.
- Taylor Blake, Alberto Sydney; Holzman, Gregory (December 2012). "A new Zamia species from the Panama Canal Area" (PDF). Botanical Review. 78 (4): 335–344. doi:10.1007/s12229-012-9105-4 – via The Cycad Society.
