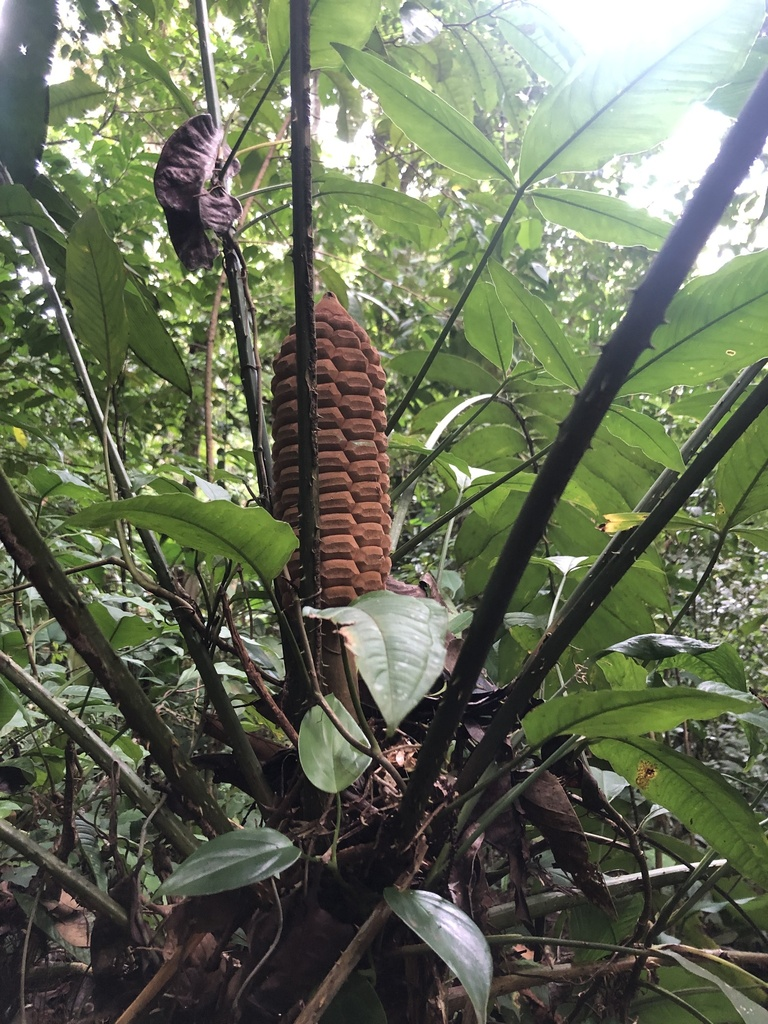

Conservation status
- Critically Endangered (IUCN 3.1)

Scientific classification
- Kingdom: Plantae
- Clade: Embryophytes
- Clade: Tracheophytes
- Clade: Spermatophytes
- Clade: Gymnospermae
- Division: Cycadophyta
- Class: Cycadopsida
- Order: Cycadales
- Family: Zamiaceae
- Genus: Zamia
- Species: Z. nesophila

Binomial name
- Zamia nesophila A.S.Taylor, J.L.Haynes & Holzman

= Zamia nesophila =

Species of cycad

Zamia nesophila, common name "guade teet", is a species of cycad in the family Zamiaceae. It is endemic to several islands in northwestern Panama. Most plants grow on sandy beaches close to the sea, although some grow inland in forests. The species is critically endangered due to seaside development.

== Classification ==
Taylor B. et al. (2008) described Z. nesophila based on specimens from the type locality in Bocas del Toro Province, Panama. The population had previously been regarded as part of the highly variable species Z. skinneri. It remains part of the Zamia skinneri species complex. Taylor B. et al. (2012) proposed that Z. nesiphila evolved from Z. skinneri or its predecessor as a result of being isolated on islands.

== Description ==
Z. nesophila is a shrub or small tree, with a stem growing up to 2.8 metres (9 ft 2 in) tall and 6 to 24 centimetres (2.4 to 9.4 in) in diameter. The stem may branch at the base or the top, sometimes both. There are up to 20 leaves per crown, the average number is about 11. The leaves are 116 to 239 centimetres (46 to 94 in) long, with 5 to 12 pairs of leaflets. Leaflets are elliptic, acuminate, and plicate (pleated) between veins, and with serrated edges. Leaflets along the middle of the stem are 25 to 38 centimetres (9.8 to 15.0 in) long and 6.5 to 10.5 centimetres (2.6 to 4.1 in) wide. The leaves are bright green when they emerge. They mature to a glossy medium green.

== Reproduction ==
Like all Zamias, Z. nesophila is dioecious, with individual plants bearing either male or female stroboli or cones, but not both. Microstrobili, male cones, are 8 to 16 centimetres (3.1 to 6.3 in) long and 2 to 2.5 centimetres (0.79 to 0.98 in) wide, conical-cylindrical or elongated conical-cylindrical. The microstrobili occur singly or in groups of 2 to 5, and are reddish-golden to brownish-yellow. The megastrobili, female cones, are 15 to 39 centimetres (5.9 to 15.4 in) long and 4.5 to 10.4 centimetres (1.8 to 4.1 in) wide. They are cylindrical-globose, usually with a single megastrobolus per plant. The megastrobili emerge covered with yellow-brown to tan hairs which mature to green or greyish-green with tan to brown hairs. Seeds are 1.9 to 2.8 centimetres (0.75 to 1.10 in) long and 1.1 to 1.8 centimetres (0.43 to 0.71 in) wide. There are 400 or more seeds in a mature cone. The sarcotesta (seed coat) is bright red on a mature seed. Pollination has observed to occur three times in a year.

== Mutualism ==
The beetle Pharaxonotha clarkorum is in an obligatory mutualistic relationship with Zamia nesophila, living and breeding in male cones and consuming pollen and cone tissues while serving as a pollinating vector by transferring pollen to female cones.

== Habitat ==
Z. nesophila is endemic to a few islands in the Bocas del Toro Archipelago. The primary habitat of Z. nesophila is sandy soil among vegetation on beaches. The largest populations are just above the high tide line on beaches where they are subject to salt water spray and flooding. A secondary habitat is acidic soil with humus on low hills in tropical forests on some of the islands. A population of about 15,000 plants along a beach has been largely destroyed by development since 2007. Another population of at least 10,000 plants was largely destroyed by the development of a beach resort. Smaller populations have also been destroyed by seaside development.

== Sources ==
- Taylor B., Alberto S.; Haynes, Jody L.; Holzman, Greg (2008). "Taxonomical, nomenclatural and biogeographical revelations in the Zamie skinneri complex of Central America (Cycadales; Zamiaceae)" (PDF). Botanical Journal of the Linnean Society. 158 (3): 399–429. doi:10.1111/j.1095-8339.2008.00886.x.
- Taylor B., Alberto S.; Haynes, Jody L.; Stevenson, Dennis W.; Holzman, Gregory; Mendieta, Jorge (2012). "Biogeographic Insights in Central American Cycad Biology" (PDF). In Stevens, Lawrence (ed.). Global Advances in Biogeography. Rejika, Croatia: InTechOpen. pp. 73–98. ISBN 978-953-51-0454-4.
