= Zamia imperialis =

Conservation status
- Endangered (IUCN 3.1)

Scientific classification
- Kingdom: Plantae
- Clade: Embryophytes
- Clade: Tracheophytes
- Clade: Spermatophytes
- Clade: Gymnospermae
- Division: Cycadophyta
- Class: Cycadopsida
- Order: Cycadales
- Family: Zamiaceae
- Genus: Zamia
- Species: Z. imperialis

Binomial name
- Zamia imperialis A.S.Taylor, J.L.Haynes & Holzman

Species of cycad

Zamia imperialis is a species of plant in the family Zamiaceae. The description is based on specimens found in Coclé Province, Panama. It is part of the Zamia skinneri species complex.

Taylor B. et al. (2008) described Z. imperialis based on specimens from the type locality in Coclé Province, Panama. It was previously known as "red-leafed skinneri". Its common name is "cebolla".

== Description ==
Z. imperialis is a shrub or small tree, with a stem growing up to 1 metre (3 ft 3 in) tall and 22 centimetres (8.7 in) in diameter. The stem may branch at the base or the top, sometimes both. There are up to 12 leaves per crown, the average number is about three. The leaves are 52 to 257 centimetres (20 to 101 in) long, with 2 to 9 pairs of leaflets. Leaflets are elliptic and acuminate, plicate (pleated) between veins, and with serrated edges. Leaflets along the middle of the stem are 25 to 75 centimetres (9.8 to 29.5 in) long and 6.5 to 21 centimetres (2.6 to 8.3 in) wide. The leaves are dark red when they emerge, with light hairs. They mature to a glossy dark green.

== Reproduction ==
Like all Zamias, Z. imperialis is dioecious, with individual plants bearing either male or female stroboli or cones, but not both. Microstrobili, male cones, are 8.5 to 19 centimetres (3.3 to 7.5 in) long and 2 to 3 centimetres (0.79 to 1.18 in) wide, conical-cylindrical or elongated conical-cylindrical. The microstrobili occur singly or in small groups, and are yellowish to brownish-yellowish. The megastrobili, female cones, are 21 to 31 centimetres (8.3 to 12.2 in) long and 7 to 11 centimetres (2.8 to 4.3 in) wide. They are cylindrical to cylindrical-globose, usually with a single megastrobolus per plant. The megastrobili emerge covered with dense reddish to reddish-brown hairs. They lose the hairs and turn brown as they mature. Seeds are 1.9 to 3 centimetres (0.75 to 1.18 in) long and 1.1 to 1.9 centimetres (0.43 to 0.75 in) wide. There are 370 or more seeds in a mature cone. The sarcotesta (seed coat) is bright red on a mature seed. Strobili appear annually. The seeds take about a year to develop after fertilization. Female plants do not produce megastrobili every year.

== Habitat ==
Z. imperialis grows on loam soils with lots of humus in open upland forest or in muddy soil in secondary growth. Many plants grow in shade, which apparently restricts how often they produce strobili. Plants in sunnier areas where trees have fallen produce strobili more frequently. Individual plants are widely scattered and hard to find, blending into the surrounding vegetation. Seedlings are rare. Two main populations are known, one with slightly more than 100 plants, and the other with less than 100 plants. While one population is in a national park, both are subject to habitat destruction. Locals regularly traverse the areas where the plants grow and chop at the plants with machetes because of the prickles on the petioles of the leafs. One population of Z. obliqua, which is found in several locations in Panama, grows in association with Z. imperialis.

== Sources ==
- Taylor B., Alberto S.; Haynes, Jody L.; Holzman, Greg (2008). "Taxonomical, nomenclatural and biogeographical revelations in the Zamie skinneri complex of Central America (Cycadales; Zamiaceae)" (PDF). Botanical Journal of the Linnean Society. 158 (3): 399–429. doi:10.1111/j.1095-8339.2008.00886.x.
- Taylor B., Alberto S.; Haynes, Jody L.; Stevenson, Dennis W.; Holzman, Gregory; Mendieta, Jorge (2012). "Biogeographic Insights in Central American Cycad Biology" (PDF). In Stevens, Lawrence (ed.). Global Advances in Biogeography. Rejika, Croatia: InTechOpen. pp. 73–98. ISBN 978-953-51-0454-4.
