= Zamia nana =

Conservation status
- Endangered (IUCN 3.1)

Scientific classification
- Kingdom: Plantae
- Clade: Embryophytes
- Clade: Tracheophytes
- Clade: Spermatophytes
- Clade: Gymnospermae
- Division: Cycadophyta
- Class: Cycadopsida
- Order: Cycadales
- Family: Zamiaceae
- Genus: Zamia
- Species: Z. nana

Binomial name
- Zamia nana A.Linstr., Calonje, D.W.Stev. & A.S.Taylor

Species of cycad

Zamia nana is a species of plant in the family Zamiaceae. It is found in Coclé Province in Panama.
