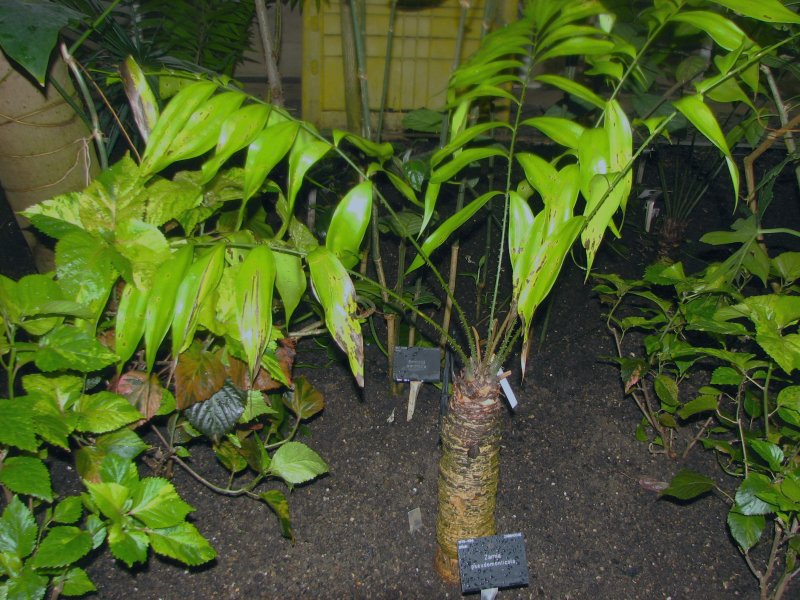

Conservation status
- Near Threatened (IUCN 3.1)

Scientific classification
- Kingdom: Plantae
- Clade: Tracheophytes
- Clade: Gymnospermae
- Division: Cycadophyta
- Class: Cycadopsida
- Order: Cycadales
- Family: Zamiaceae
- Genus: Zamia
- Species: Z. pseudomonticola

Binomial name
- Zamia pseudomonticola L.D.Gomez

= Zamia pseudomonticola =

Species of cycad

Zamia pseudomonticola is a species of plant in the family Zamiaceae. It is found in Costa Rica (Puntarenas Province) and Panama (Chiriquí Province). Its natural habitat is subtropical or tropical moist montane forests. It is threatened by habitat loss.

== Mutualism ==
The beetle Pharaxonotha confusa is in an obligatory mutualistic relationship with Zamia pseudomonticola, living and breeding in male cones and consuming pollen and cone tissues while serving as a pollinating vector by transferring pollen to female cones.
